= Eleanor of Aquitaine =

Queen of France (1137–52) and England (1154–89); Duchess of Aquitaine (1137–1204)

Eleanor
- Tomb effigy at Fontevraud Abbey

Duchess of Aquitaine
- Reign: 9 April 1137 – 31 March or 1 April 1204
- Predecessor: William X
- Successor: John
- Co-rulers: Louis (1137–1152); Henry (1152–1189); Richard (1189–1199); John (1199–1204)

Queen consort of the Franks
- Tenure: 1 August 1137 – 21 March 1152
- Coronation: 25 December 1137

Queen consort of England
- Tenure: 19 December 1154 – 6 July 1189
- Coronation: 19 December 1154
- Born: c. 1122–1124; Bordeaux, Aquitaine
- Died: 1 April 1204 (aged 79–82); Fontevraud Abbey,Anjou
- Burial: Fontevraud Abbey, Fontevraud-l'Abbaye, Maine-et-Loire, France
- Spouses: Louis VII of France (m. 1137; ann. 1152) Henry II of England (m. 1152; died 1189)
- Issue Detail: Marie, Countess of Champagne; Alix, Countess of Blois; Henry the Young King; Matilda, Duchess of Saxony; Richard I, King of England; Geoffrey II, Duke of Brittany; Eleanor, Queen of Castile; Joan, Queen of Sicily; John, King of England
- House: Ramnulfids
- Father: William X, Duke of Aquitaine
- Mother: Aénor de Châtellerault

Eleanor of Aquitaine (French: Aliénor d'Aquitaine or Éléonore d'Aquitaine; Occitan: Alienòr d'Aquitània [aljeˈnɔɾ dakiˈtanjɔ]; Latin: Helienordis, Alienorde or Alianor; (Note: For Helienordis, see Ego Helienordis, Francorum regina, et Willelmi ducis Aquitanici filia – I Eleanor, Queen of the Franks, and daughter of William Duke of Aquitaine. Letter of 28 December 1140, also Ego Helienordis, Dei gratia humilis Francorum regina (1151). The spelling of Eleanor's name varies widely in the Latin chronicles, for instance Alienorde in the Chroniques de Touraine, but Alianor in Gervase of Canterbury.) c. 1124 – 1 April 1204) was Duchess of Aquitaine from 1137 to 1204, Queen of France from 1137 to 1152 as the wife of King Louis VII, and Queen of England from 1154 to 1189 as the wife of King Henry II. As the reigning duchess of Aquitaine, she ruled jointly with her husbands and two of her sons, Kings Richard I and John of England. As the heiress of the House of Poitiers, which controlled much of southwestern France, she was one of the wealthiest and most powerful people in Western Europe during the High Middle Ages.

The eldest child of Duke William X of Aquitaine and Aénor de Châtellerault, Eleanor became duchess upon her father's death in 1137. Later that year, she married Louis, son of King Louis VI of France. Shortly afterwards, Eleanor's father-in-law died and her husband became king, making her queen consort. Louis VII and Eleanor had two daughters, Marie and Alix. During the Second Crusade, Eleanor accompanied Louis to the Holy Land. Pope Eugene III rejected an initial request in 1149 for an annulment of the marriage on grounds of consanguinity. In 1152, after fifteen years of marriage, Eleanor had not borne a male heir, and the annulment was granted. Their daughters were declared legitimate, custody was awarded to Louis, and Eleanor's lands were restored to her.

In the same year, Eleanor married Henry, the Duke of Normandy. In 1154, Henry and Eleanor became king and queen of England. The couple had five sons and three daughters, but they eventually became estranged. Henry imprisoned Eleanor for supporting the 1173 revolt against him by their sons Young Henry, Richard and Geoffrey. She was not released until 1189, when Henry II died and Richard I ascended the throne. As queen dowager, Eleanor acted as regent during Richard's long absences from England and France. On Richard's death in 1199, she successfully campaigned for his younger brother John to succeed him. After continuing turmoil between the French and English kings and the successive loss of the lands she and Henry II had once ruled over, she died in 1204 and was buried in Fontevraud Abbey in France.

== Sources ==
France, Aquitaine and Poitiers in 1154 with the expansion of the Plantagenet lands

There is a scarcity of primary sources on Eleanor's life. There are no contemporary biographies, and modern biographies are largely drawn from annals and chronicles, generally written by clerics associated with the royal courts. There are very few surviving records from Aquitaine; she is barely mentioned in records of the French court and appears to have been actively erased from memory. Consequently, accounts of Eleanor appear largely as a peripheral figure in chronicles of the men around her. Important secular sources from England and Wales include Roger of Howden, Walter Map, Ralph de Diceto, Gerald of Wales and Ralph Niger. While some were relatively neutral, the writings of Map and Gerald were largely satirical polemics, while Niger's criticisms are mainly directed at Eleanor's second husband, Henry II of England, rather than Eleanor herself. Among the chroniclers are also clerical sources, including Gervase of Canterbury, Ralph of Coggeshall, Richard of Devizes, William of Newburgh and Ranulf Higden. The latter were mainly influenced by their revulsion at the murder of Thomas Becket in 1170. Although Richard of Devizes admired Eleanor's perseverance in supporting her son Richard, all of them expressed negative views about women in power and hinted at some darker attributes that eventually led to a "Black Legend" that became associated with her. Twentieth-century writers such as Amy Kelly and Marion Meade would create an opposite myth of a feminist heroine, referred to as the "Golden Myth", that pervaded many subsequent accounts, while similar treatment in French literature is seen in the work of Régine Pernoud. (Note: Two types of legend characterise her legacy, usually referred to as the "Black Legend" (la légende noire) and the "Golden Myth" (mythe doré). See, for example Jacques Le Goff "a été à la fois victime d'une legende noire et bénéficiaire d'un mythe doré" (has been both the victim of a black legend and the beneficiary of a golden myth).) More recent scholarship has sought to correct both of these characterisations.

In the absence of reliable contemporary accounts, legend and speculation have frequently been resorted to; "rarely in the course of historical endeavor has so much been written, over so many centuries, about one woman of whom we know so little".

== Childhood and adolescence (1124–1137) ==
=== Family origins and education ===
Eleanor was descended on her father's side from a long line of dukes of Aquitaine dating back to the 10th century, who in turn succeeded the Carolingian monarchs of the Kingdom of Aquitaine. Twelfth-century Aquitaine was one of the wealthiest and most powerful vassal states within France at that time. The French kings ruled over a relatively small area around the Île-de-France to the north-west, and the rulers of the surrounding duchies (duchés) and counties (comtés) gave only nominal allegiance to the French crown.

While little is known of Eleanor's early life, many biographers have speculated on what it was like from accounts of aristocratic households of the era. Her year of birth is not known precisely; all that is known for certain is that the first mention of her is found in a document from July 1129. (Note: Few families kept records of their children's birth and the dating of a new year was also inconsistent.) Tradition places her birth during one of her parents' visits to Bordeaux, likely at her father's nearby castle of Belin. Other authors suggest Poitiers, Ombrière Palace, Bordeaux, or Nieul-sur-l'Autise. While the date of her birth was once given as 1122 or 1124, the latter is now generally accepted. A late 13th-century genealogy of her family listing her as 13 years old at her father's death in the spring of 1137 provides the best evidence that Eleanor was born in 1124. However, some chronicles mention a fidelity oath of lords of Aquitaine on the occasion of Eleanor's fourteenth birthday in 1136. Her parents are unlikely to have married before 1121. Her age at her death is thus stated as 80 or 82.

Eleanor was the oldest of three children born to Duke William X of Aquitaine and his wife, Aénor de Châtellerault. Her father was the son of Duke William IX of Aquitaine and Countess Philippa of Toulouse. Her mother was the daughter of Viscount Aimery I of Châtellerault and Dangereuse de l'Isle Bouchard. Dangereuse was also William IX's longtime mistress, and she and William IX then arranged for their respective children to be married to each other. Eleanor had two younger siblings, Aélith and Aigret. (Note: The existence of an illegitimate half-brother named Joscelin has been discredited. Another half-brother, William, has also been claimed without evidence.) Eleanor was named for her mother Aénor and baptised as Aliénor from the Latin alia Ænor, which means the other Aénor. It became Eléanor in the langues d'oïl of northern France and Eleanor in English, but the exact spelling was never fixed in her lifetime. (Note: Suger spells Eleanor's name Aanor, others Alienor, or occasionally Helnienordis.) In 1130, Eleanor's brother Aigret and their mother both died. With her brother's death, Eleanor became the heir presumptive to her father's domains.

Little, if anything, is known of Eleanor's education. (Note: Biographers have argued that her father would have wanted her to have a good education, which might have included subjects such as arithmetic, astronomy, history and music as well as domestic skills, sports, riding, hawking, and hunting.) The only contemporary record of her education comes from Bertran de Born, a troubadour, who states that she read the poetry of her native tongue. Although the language of Bordeaux and Poitiers was Poitevin, a northern French (langue d'oïl) dialect, Eleanor was soon exposed to Occitan (langue d'oc), the southern dialect and language of the poets and courtiers at the ducal court. (Note: Biographers have suggested that she would also have been taught to read and speak Latin, and to be acquainted with literature.)

=== Inheritance (1137) ===
In 1137, William X left Poitiers for Bordeaux and took his daughters with him. Upon reaching Bordeaux, he left them at l'Ombrière Castle in the charge of his loyal vassal and the local archbishop, Geoffrey of Louroux. William then set out for the Shrine of Saint James of Compostela in the company of other pilgrims. However, he died on Good Friday of that year (9 April).

Eleanor, aged 13, then became the duchess of Aquitaine, and thus one of the richest and most eligible heiresses in Europe. Since kidnapping an heiress was seen as a viable option for obtaining a title and lands, when William X knew that he was dying, he named King Louis VI of France as Eleanor's guardian. William requested that Louis take care of both Eleanor and the lands and find her a suitable husband. However, until a husband was found, the king had the legal right to her lands. William also insisted to his companions that his death be kept a secret until Louis was informed; the men were to journey as quickly as possible from Saint James of Compostela across the Pyrenees to notify Archbishop Geoffrey, then to Paris to inform the king. (Note: The authenticity of William X's alleged will, setting out these supposed conditions, is dubious at best. Abbot Suger is the main source for these events.)

Louis VI, who was in poor health, recognised an opportunity to realise a long-standing ambition to enlarge his dominions by the acquisition of Aquitaine. His eldest surviving son, Louis, had originally been destined for monastic life, but had become the heir apparent when the king's eldest son, Philip, died after being thrown from his horse in 1131. Louis VI realised the dangers of not swiftly settling the succession of the Aquitainian duchy, while a marriage between his son and Eleanor would add the considerable resources of Aquitaine to the Capetian holdings. Thus, he spent little time in dispatching the young Louis, accompanied by a large retinue of some 500 knights, along with Abbot Suger of Saint-Denis, Bishop Geoffrey II of Chartres, and Counts Theobald II of Champagne and Ralph I of Vermandois, to Bordeaux to secure the marriage.

== Queen of France (1137–1152) ==
Wedding of Louis and Eleanor (14th C)
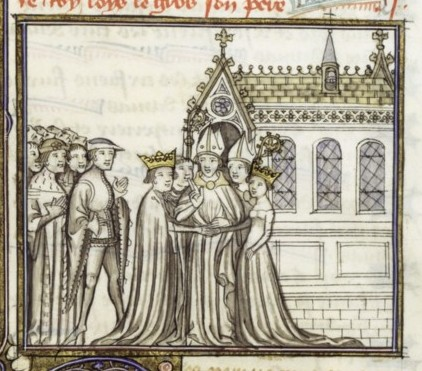
Chantilly Bibliotheque

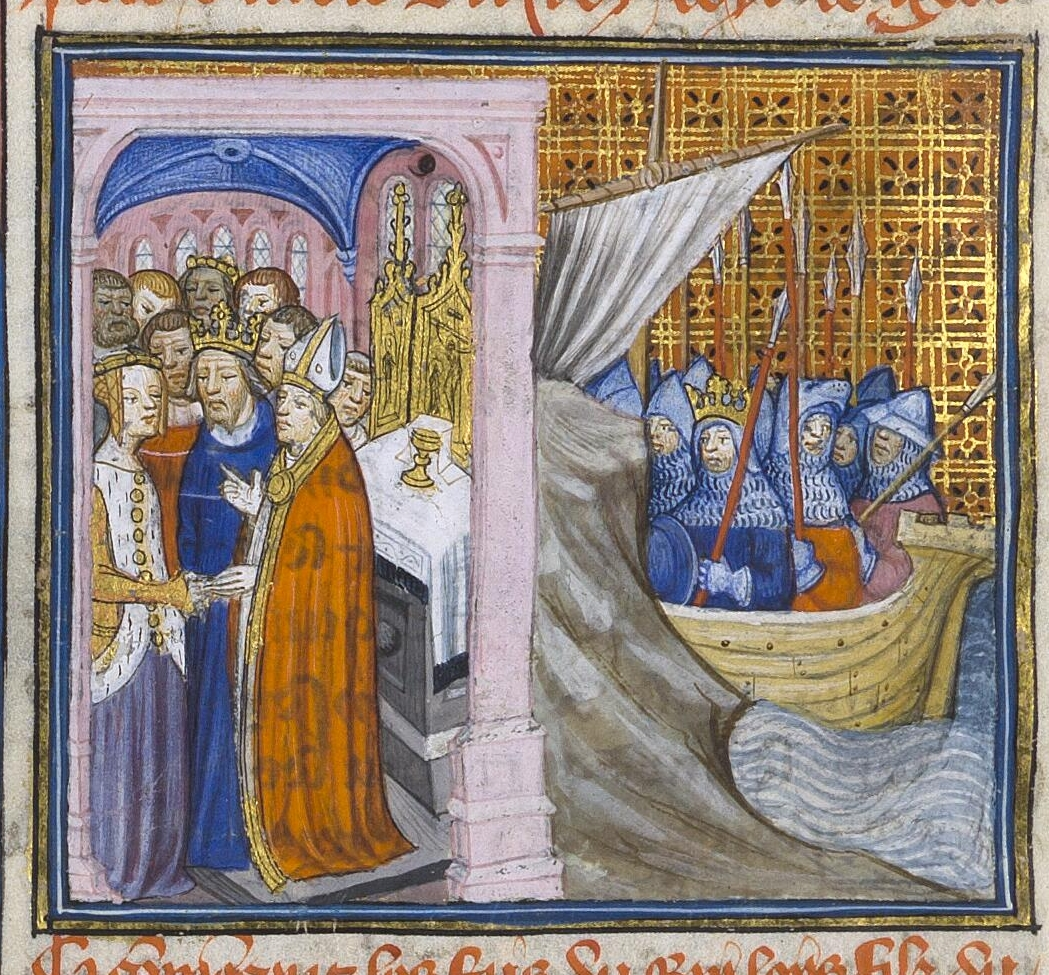
Chronique de France
(Manuscript illuminations: On far right, departure for the crusade)

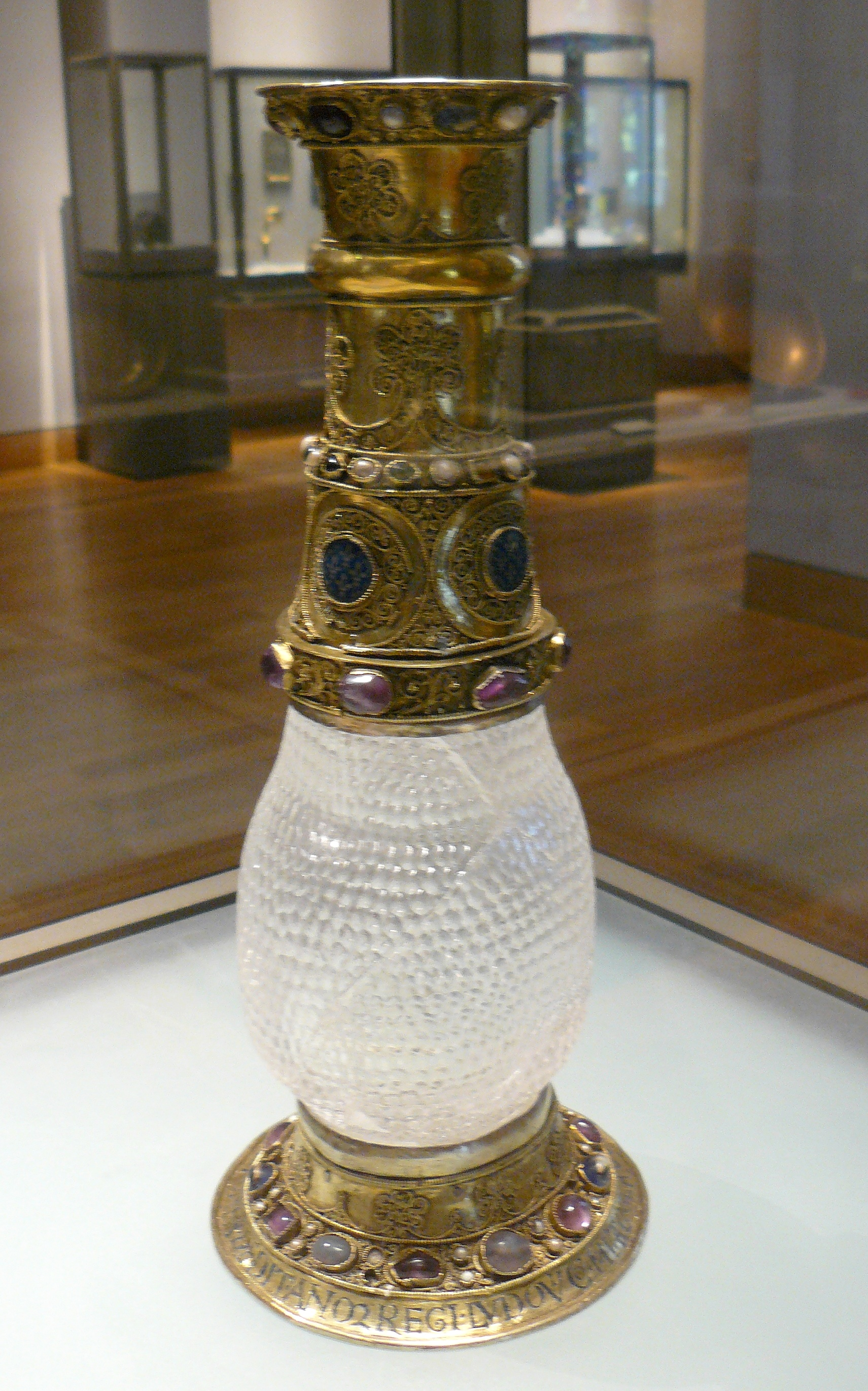
Eleanor's rock crystal vase, which she gave Louis as a wedding gift, now in the Louvre Museum

=== Marriage ===
Little is known from the time that Eleanor reigned as queen of France. On 25 July 1137, Archbishop Geoffrey of Bordeaux oversaw her wedding to Louis in the Cathedral of Saint-André in Bordeaux. Immediately after the wedding, the couple were enthroned as duke and duchess of Aquitaine. It was agreed that the duchy would remain independent of France until Eleanor's oldest son became both king of France and duke of Aquitaine. As a wedding present, she gave Louis a rock crystal vase. (Note: The rock crystal vase originally belonged to Eleanor's grandfather, William IX of Aquitaine. Louis donated Eleanor's vase to Suger, who in turn offered it to the Basilica of St Denis. Later it came into the possession the Louvre museum in Paris. This vase is the only object connected with Eleanor that still survives.)

From Bordeaux, the couple proceeded to Poitiers, arriving on 1 August, where after a week of festivities they were invested as count and countess of Poitou on 8 August. Louis's tenure as count of Poitou and duke of Aquitaine and Gascony lasted only a few days. On their way to Paris, a messenger arrived with the news that Louis VI had died on 1 August and therefore they were now king and queen of France. Louis had already been crowned in the Capetian fashion in 1131 and on Christmas Day 1137, Eleanor was crowned queen at Bourges.

Eleanor was not popular with some members of the court, including Abbot Suger and Louis's mother Adelaide of Maurienne, who left the court shortly thereafter and remarried. Some courtiers made unfavourable reference to memories of Constance of Arles, third wife of Robert II of France and ancestor of both Louis and Eleanor. Constance had had a reputation for being indiscreet in both dress and language. (Note: "[Adelaide] perhaps [based] her preconceptions on another southerner, Constance of Provence ... tales of her allegedly immodest dress and language still continued to circulate among the sober Franks.") Eleanor's conduct was repeatedly criticised by church elders, particularly Bernard of Clairvaux and Suger, as indecorous. Modifications were made to the austere Cité Palace in Paris for Eleanor's sake and she was joined by her sister Aélith, who became known there as Petronilla.

=== Claiming Toulouse (1141) ===
Eleanor was descended from the counts of Toulouse through her grandmother, Countess Philippa. Philippa was the sole child of Count William IV of Toulouse, but following her father's death in 1093, Philippa's uncle Raymond IV (r. 1094–1105) asserted a right to the title. Philippa then persuaded her husband, Duke William IX of Aquitaine, to enforce her right, a struggle that lasted nearly 30 years, finally ending in 1123 with Raymond IV's son, Alfonso Jordan (r. 1112–1148). During this time, control of Toulouse continually changed hands between William IX and Raymond IV's children. Philippa's claim was passed on to Eleanor's father then to Eleanor herself. Louis attempted to enforce her claim by marching on Toulouse, arriving at the walls on 21 June 1141. Although he laid siege to the city, he was unable to subjugate it and withdrew, after accepting the homage of Count Alfonso. Despite this setback, Eleanor continued to press her claims, with further expeditions in 1159 and throughout her life.

=== Conflict with the church ===
Louis soon came into conflict with the church and Pope Innocent II (1130–1143). In 1140, he intervened in the election to the see of Poitiers on finding that a new bishop, Grimoald, had been elected and consecrated without his consent. This was despite the fact that his father had granted the ecclesiastical province of Bordeaux the right to do so and that he himself had approved this. Louis then attempted to prohibit Grimoald from entering the city, thus drawing both Innocent II and Bernard of Clairvaux into the dispute. Innocent issued an order to overrule the royal edict, but Grimoald died, ending the dispute. The ecclesiastical authorities were aware of the unsuccessful attempt of both William IX and William X of Aquitaine to interfere in church matters. However, the Poitiers affair was soon followed by other attempts by Louis to exert his authority.

The most consequential of these occurred when the archbishopric of Bourges became vacant in 1141. Louis put forward as a candidate his chancellor, Cadurc, while vetoing the one suitable candidate, Pierre de la Chatre, a monk who was promptly elected by the canons of Bourges and consecrated by Pope Innocent in Rome. Louis bolted the gates of Bourges against the new archbishop on his return. The Pope, recalling similar attempts by Eleanor's father to exile supporters of Innocent from Poitou and replace them with priests loyal to himself, may have blamed Eleanor for this, but stated that Louis was only "a foolish schoolboy" and should be taught not to meddle in such matters. Outraged, Louis swore upon relics that so long as he lived, Pierre should never enter Bourges. An interdict was thereupon imposed upon the royal household and lands, and Theobald II of Champagne granted Pierre refuge, further annoying the king.

Louis had been in a situation of increasing conflict with Theobald of Champagne, and the Bourges affair, together with a crisis in Theobald's family, brought this to a head. In 1125, Theobald's sister Eleanor had married Ralph I of Vermandois, but Ralph had been forming a liaison with Petronilla, Eleanor's sister. Ralph eventually deserted his wife, seeking an annulment of their marriage on grounds of consanguinity, (Note: The church forbade divorce, but grounds of consanguinity allowed a marriage to be annulled as if it had never happened. While consanguinity was common among the aristocracy, who had limited marital options, it was rarely proposed as an impediment to marriage. Instead, it provided a convenient route for them to escape unsatisfactory marriages.) to which Louis acquiesced, finding three bishops who agreed that the marriage was invalid and then in 1142 officiated at the wedding of Petronilla and Ralph. Both Theobald, who had taken his sister under protection, and Bernard of Clairvaux protested to Pope Innocent, who convened a council, voided both Ralph's annulment from Eleanor of Champagne and his marriage to Petronilla, excommunicated one bishop and suspended the other two. Furthermore, Ralph was ordered to return to his first wife. Upon his refusal, he and Petronilla were excommunicated and their lands placed under interdiction.

Eleanor's assumed role in these affairs led to the first appearance of the black legend that would be associated with her for centuries. Women, even queens, were not expected to concern themselves with such matters, and that therefore she might represent darker powers. Rumours began to associate her with mythical figures such as Melusine. Things took a more salacious turn when it was suggested she was having an affair with Count Geoffrey Plantagenet of Anjou.

Louis rejected the papal legate's decision and ordered an invasion of Champagne, in a war that would last two years (1142–44) and ended with the occupation of Champagne by the royal army. For a year, the royal army laid waste to the Champagne countryside, but since Theobald showed no signs of backing down, Louis took personal charge of the assault in 1143, which focused on the siege of the town of Vitry. More than a thousand people sought refuge in the cathedral, which caught fire, burning alive everyone inside. Horrified at the carnage, Louis returned to Paris, seeking to make peace with Theobald. In return, and with Innocent's support, he demanded Ralph renounce Petronilla and the interdiction on Ralph and Petronilla was duly lifted, while Louis ordered a retreat. When Ralph refused the king's demands, the royal forces once more invaded Champagne.

Public opinion was turning against the war, with Bernard of Clairvaux in particular very critical, while Suger advised settling the issues. Innocent II died in September 1143 and was succeeded by Celestine II (1143–1144), who lifted the interdiction in an offer of conciliation at Bernard's suggestion. As a result, Louis became more open to negotiation. It was about this time that questions of consanguinity were first raised about Louis and Eleanor's marriage, since he had opposed a number of other marriages on these grounds, including that of Ralph of Vermandois and Eleanor of Champagne. Consequently, a number of negotiations took place over the winter of 1143–1144. Finally, Suger hosted a meeting at his newly-built monastic church at Saint-Denis during a feast day on 22 April 1144, at which Bernard persuaded Eleanor that her efforts on behalf of her sister were hopeless, and peace was restored, although the couple continued to refuse to separate, and they remained excommunicated until 1148, when Ralph's first marriage was once again invalidated and his second marriage validated. The Saint-Denis agreement also provided for Louis's withdrawal of opposition to the archbishop of Bourges. The discussion between Eleanor and Bernard included reference to Eleanor's apparent infertility (she had had one miscarriage in 1138) and a suggestion that she might be rewarded for her concessions with a child. (Note: Bernard said to Eleanor, "My child, seek those things which make for peace. Cease to stir up the king against the Church, and urge upon him a better course of action. If you will promise to do this, I in return promise to entreat the merciful Lord to grant you offspring.") In April 1145, Eleanor gave birth to a daughter, Marie. On Sunday, 11 June 1144, the king and Queen attended the dedication of Saint-Denis, at which time Louis donated Eleanor's crystal vase.

=== Second Crusade (1145–1149) ===
==== Taking the Cross (1145–1147) ====
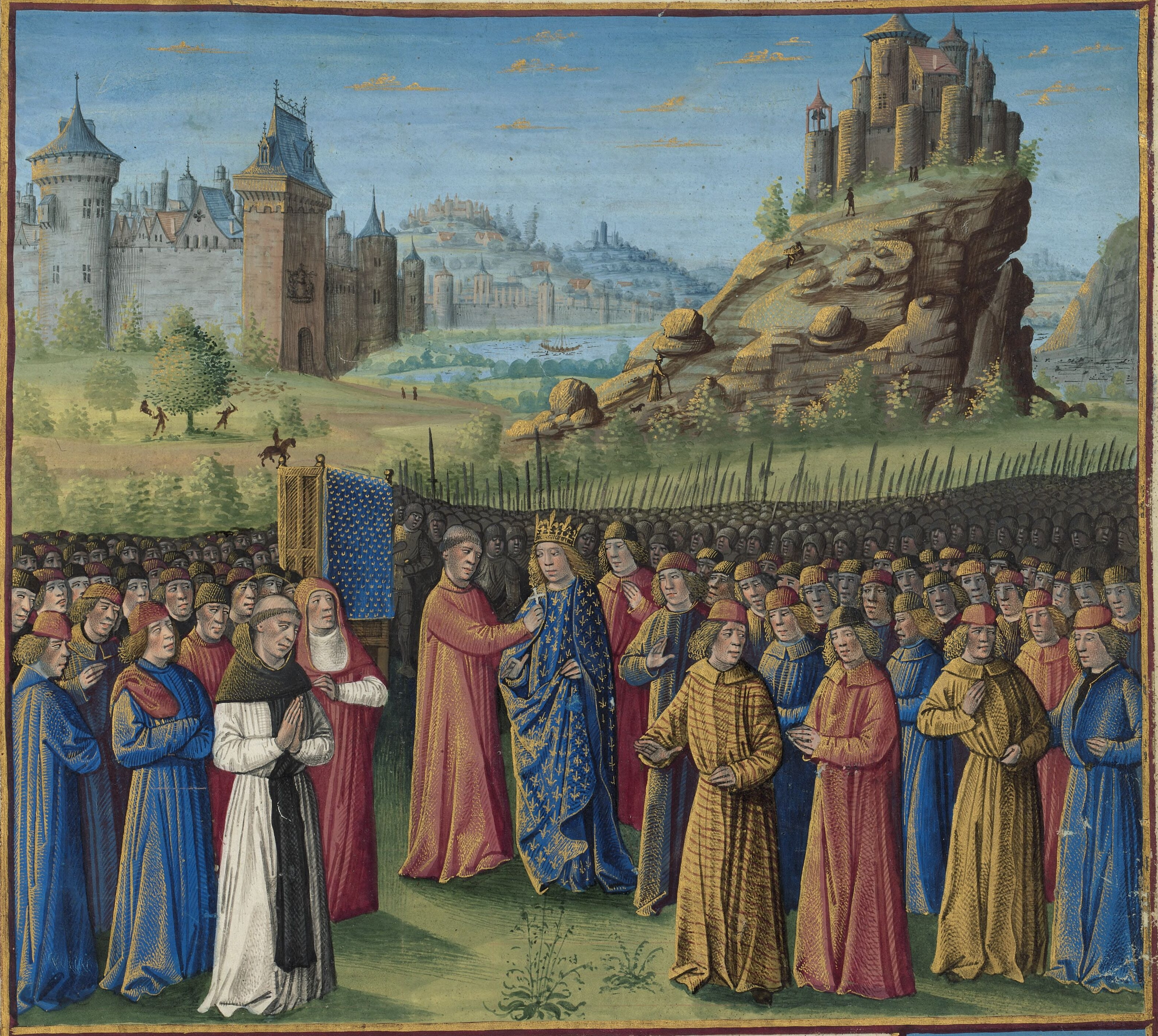
Louis VII taking the cross, by Jean Colombe, c. 1490

Route of the Second Crusade

Louis remained obsessed over the massacre at Vitry and considered a pilgrimage to the Holy Land, but events overtook this desire. The First Crusade (1096–1099) had succeeded in capturing the Holy Land from the Turks and establishing a system of four (largely Frankish) crusader states to administer the region, known as the Outremer. (Note: Outremer: Literally "overseas") But this was threatened, when on 24 December 1144, Zengi and the Seljuk Turks captured Edessa, capital of one of the crusader states, making the adjacent Principality of Antioch, County of Tripoli and Kingdom of Jerusalem vulnerable. Of these, Antioch was the most vulnerable, and of particular concern since the prince of Antioch was Raymond of Poitiers, Eleanor's uncle. On 1 December Pope Eugene III issued a bull requesting that Louis and all faithful French Christians mount a crusade to rescue the remaining States. Louis and Eleanor were at Bourges when the message arrived, and Louis responded enthusiastically on Christmas Day that he would lead a crusade. Noting a lack of enthusiasm among the French nobility, he postponed further action till Easter 1146. Final planning took place at a gathering in Saint-Denis over Easter that year attended by Pope Eugene. Louis delegated administration of his kingdom to Eugene, who appointed Abbot Suger and Ralph of Vermandois as co-regents.

Eleanor also formally took the cross during Bernard's sermon, which meant leaving her daughter behind. Eleanor recruited some women of the Aquitainian nobility for the campaign as well as some 300 other women who volunteered to help. It was not unusual for women to take part in crusades. From Louis's perspective, there were advantages in including Eleanor. As regent to an absent monarch, she could have created problems for Suger, Louis's choice as his administrator, and he needed the support of the Aquitainian nobility. Furthermore, the crusade was ostensibly to come to the aid of her uncle. The presence of women was not without its critics, particularly among clerics, though this may have been influenced by hindsight, given that William of Newburgh's account was written well after the actual crusade. Eleanor's taking the cross provided the next opportunity for her detractors to construct her legend, with claims that she and her ladies set off for the crusades as Amazonian warriors.

==== Road to Ephesus (1147) ====
On 11 June, 25,000 to 50,000 crusaders and pilgrims gathered at Saint-Denis and began their march, first to Metz and then crossing the Rhine at Worms, and pressing on to Regensburg and the Danube river. There, they were met by envoys from Byzantine Emperor Manuel Komnenos (r. 1143–1180) and followed the river via Klosterneuburg and through Hungary, reaching the Eastern Empire by mid-August. They then crossed the Danube to Adrianople and finally arrived at Constantinople five days later, on 4 October 1147.

In Constantinople, the French crusaders were obliged to await the arrival of those of their forces that were travelling by sea. While there, they received the hospitality of the Emperor, with Louis and Eleanor staying in the Philopation palace just outside the city walls. Meanwhile, the German crusaders had gone ahead and crossed the Bosphorus into Asia Minor. Once all their forces were gathered together, the French crossed into Asia on 15 October and proceeded south to their first stop at Nicaea. Continuing south down the Aegean coast, they discovered that the Germans had suffered a major defeat at the hands of the Turks at the battle of Dorylaeum. The French, together with the remnants of the Germans, continued south on the safer coastal route to Ephesus, which they reached on 20 December. After camping at Ephesus, most of the Germans left for Constantinople.

==== Ephesus to Jerusalem (1148–1149) ====
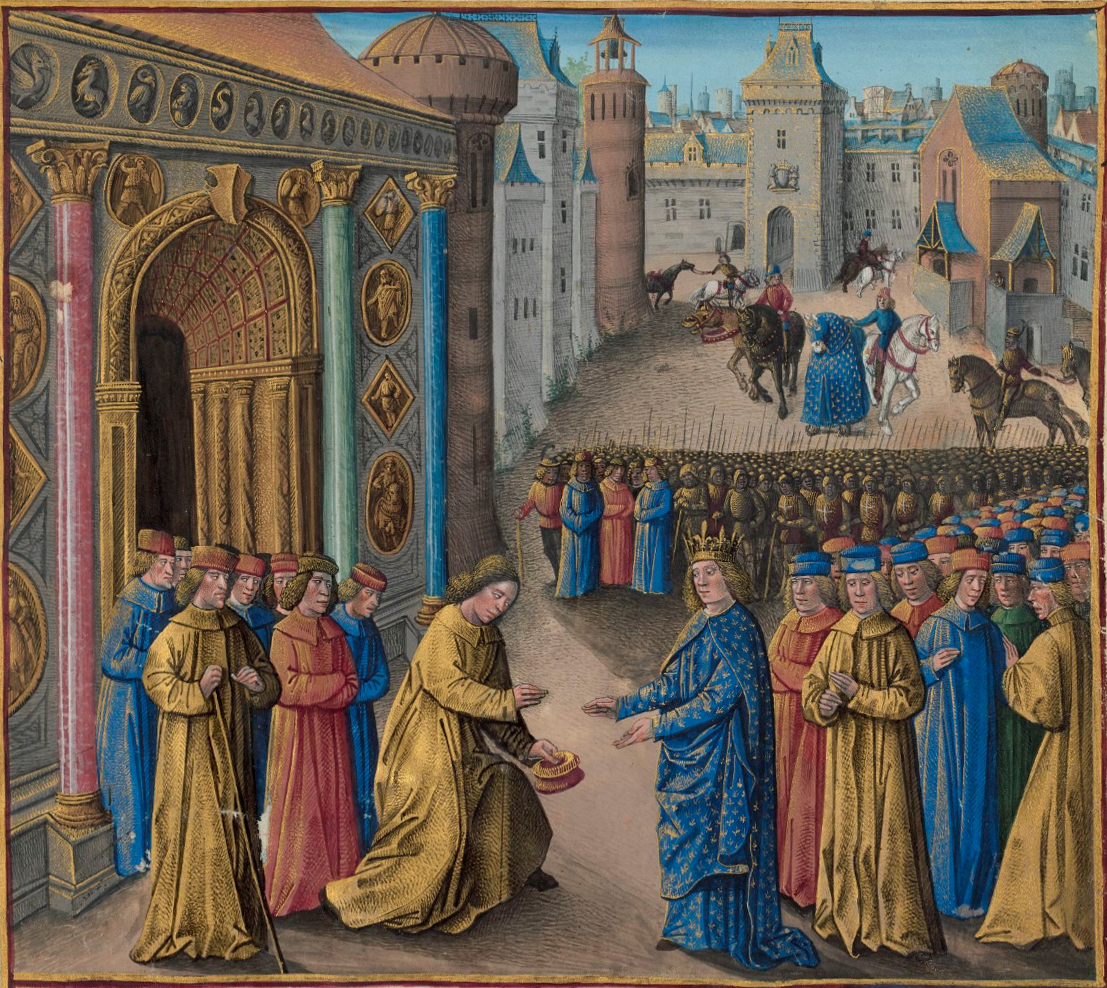
Crusaders welcomed at Antioch (by Jean Colombe)

In January 1148, Louis decided to travel inland towards Laodicea in Phrygia, to reach Antalya on the south coast and thus Antioch more quickly. They reached Laodicea on 6 January and then their route took them across the mountains. On the day of their crossing of Mount Cadmus, Louis took charge of the rear of the column, where the unarmed pilgrims and the baggage trains were, while the vanguard was commanded by the Aquitainian Geoffrey de Rancon and instructed to set camp on the plateau before the next pass. They reached the summit of Cadmus, one of the highest in their path, but Rancon, in concert with Louis's uncle Amadeus III of Savoy, chose to continue on through the pass to the next valley. Accordingly, when the main part of the column arrived, and approached the pass, separated from both the vanguard and rearguard, they were ambushed by the Turkish forces. In the ensuing Battle of Mount Cadmus, the Turks inflicted great losses on the French, while Louis barely escaped.

The chronicler William of Tyre, writing between 1170 and 1184 and thus perhaps too long after the event to be considered historically accurate, placed the blame for this disaster firmly on the amount of baggage being carried, much of it reputedly belonging to Eleanor and her ladies, and the presence of non-combatants. Louis was a weak and ineffectual military leader with no skill for maintaining troop discipline or morale, or of making informed and logical tactical decisions. Official blame for the disaster was placed on Geoffrey de Rancon, who had made the decision to continue. Since Geoffrey was Eleanor's vassal, many believed that it was she who had been ultimately responsible for the change in plan, and thus the massacre. This suspicion of responsibility did nothing for her popularity in Christendom. She was also blamed for the size of the baggage train and the fact that her Aquitanian soldiers had marched at the front and thus were not involved in the fight. The survivors reached Antalya on 20 January.

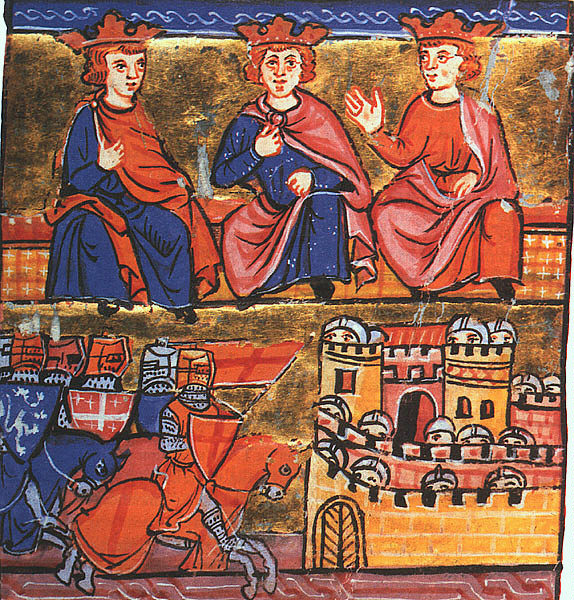
Council of Acre: Kings Conrad III of Germany, Louis VII of France, and Baldwin III of Jerusalem

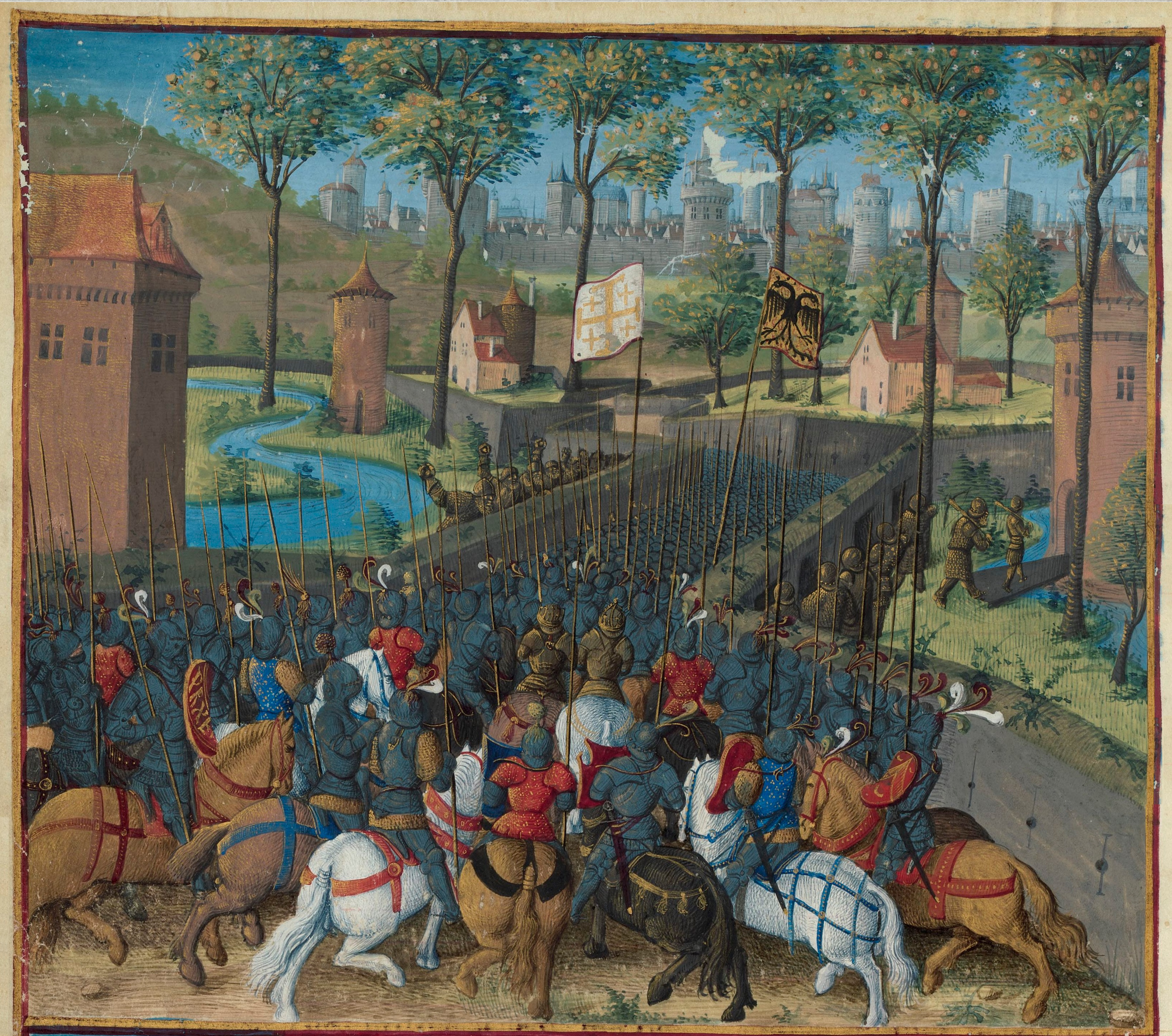
Siege of Damascus (by Jean Colombe)

In Antalya, the crusaders found there was a limited number of ships available, and those that were required more money than they were willing to pay. Consequently, the royal party sailed from the port with a relatively small group of followers, arriving in Antioch on 19 March, well behind schedule. The remainder attempted to complete the journey with great hardship and much loss, only about half of them completing the journey.

While the crusaders were initially welcomed, tensions grew between them and Raymond, Prince of Antioch. Raymond's agenda was to attack Aleppo and regain control of Edessa, and hence gain some security, while Louis was determined to press on to Jerusalem, despite the original papal decree being to recapture Edessa. (Note: The crusade had been prompted by the siege and subsequent capture of the crusader state of Edessa in 1144 by the Turkish ruler Zengi.) Louis was not keen to fight in northern Syria, and his forces were badly depleted. Furthermore, he had a personal agenda to journey in pilgrimage to Jerusalem.

Eleanor's loyalty to her uncle Raymond created conflict between her and Louis. Eventually the French, now only a tenth of their original strength, left Antioch abruptly on 28 March, despite Eleanor's protests and attempts to remain with Raymond. These conflicts once again led to the question of consanguinity being raised. According to John of Salisbury, it was Eleanor who prompted this. The crusaders reached Jerusalem in May, entering by the Jaffa Gate, where Queen Melisende and King Baldwin III greeted them. A conference was then held at Acre on 24 June to discuss strategic plans. This resulted in the disastrous siege of Damascus on 24 July. The crusaders' forced withdrawal after only four days effectively ended the crusade and many of the survivors started making plans to return to Western Europe, but Louis vowed to celebrate Easter 1149 in the Holy Land, despite Suger's pleas.

The sojourn in Antioch, the conflict between the rulers and the resulting rift between the royal couple led to chroniclers, such as John of Salisbury and William of Tyre, hinting at an adulterous and incestuous affair between Eleanor and Raymond. Such an affair would become an enduring part of her legend, which in some versions also depicted her as having an affair with a Saracen leader. Contemporary accounts suggest it was her attention to political affairs that was considered the greatest stain on her character.

==== Return to France (1149) ====
After celebrating Easter, Louis and Eleanor set sail from Acre for Italy in separate ships on 3 April but were delayed by both hostile naval forces off the Peloponnesus in May and storms which drove Eleanor's ship as far south as the Barbary Coast, and for a while their whereabouts were unknown. Louis arrived in Calabria on 29 July and eventually discovered Eleanor had reached Palermo, Sicily, where she was sheltered by agents of King Roger II at his palace. It took some time before Eleanor and Louis could be reunited. (Note: Both destinations were part of the Norman Kingdom of Sicily.)

At King Roger's court in Potenza, Eleanor had learned of the death of her uncle Raymond, who had been beheaded by Nureddin's Muslim forces at the Battle of Inab, on 29 June. Nureddin then overran most of Raymond's territories in Antioch, setting back the goals of the crusade even further. Instead of returning directly to France, Louis and Eleanor headed north towards Rome, stopping at the Abbey of Monte Cassino on 4 October after Eleanor fell ill. Pope Eugene invited them to stay at his palace at Tusculum, south of Rome, where they arrived on 9 October. Eugene had been informed by Suger of the couple's marital problems, and that they were no longer having sexual relations. The question of consanguinity and hence possible annulment was again raised, but was denied by Eugene, who declared the marriage legitimate by canon law and urged reconciliation. It is likely that Eleanor's second child was conceived at this time. From Tusculum, the couple travelled north through Italy, visiting Rome and then crossing the Alps to reach France and finally arriving in Paris around 11 November 1149, after an absence of two-and-a-half years.

=== Annulment (1152) ===
In the summer of 1150, Eleanor gave birth to a second daughter, Alix. The lack of a male heir was unprecedented in the Capetian line, Eleanor was now twenty-six and had been married for thirteen years. Not only was the likelihood of a son being born to secure the succession seen as remote, but the lack of an heir was perceived as an omen. Suger had been a strong advocate for the political advantages of the marriage between Louis and Eleanor. When he died on 13 January 1151, the balance changed since Bernard of Clairvaux was a critic of the marriage's consanguinity. A number of nobles and courtiers also advised the king to dissolve the marriage. Later that year, Count Henry of Anjou appeared at the court in Paris to pay homage to Louis as the new duke of Normandy. Chroniclers such as Gerald of Wales, William of Newburgh and Walter Map later implied that Henry's visit contributed to the dissolution of Eleanor's marriage with Louis.

By this stage, her reputation badly damaged, Eleanor's influence at court was waning. Any such dissolution would require a complex political realignment, separating the Aquitanian and Capetian possessions and jurisdictions, and in the autumn of 1151 the couple made a tour of the duchy during which much of the French presence, such as garrisons, was replaced with Eleanor's people. On 11 March 1152, at the royal castle of Beaugency on the Loire, near Orléans, Hughes de Toucy, archbishop of Sens and primate of France, (Note: The title of the archbishop of Sens was primate of the Gauls (primat des Gaules et de Germanie).) presided over a synod to consider the matter. Louis and Eleanor were both present, as were Archbishops Samson of Reims, Geoffrey of Bordeaux (Note: Archbishop Geoffrey of Bordeaux had been the celebrant at their wedding in 1137.) and Hugh of Rouen and many other bishops and nobility. Samson of Reims acted for Eleanor, who did not contest the action.

On 21 March, the four archbishops, with the approval of Pope Eugene, granted an annulment on grounds of consanguinity within the fourth degree; Eleanor was Louis's third cousin once removed, and they shared common ancestry through Robert II of France and his wife Constance of Arles. (Note: King Robert and Queen Constance were Eleanor's third great-grandparents and Louis's second great-grandparents.) Their two daughters were, however, declared legitimate. Custody of their daughters was awarded to Louis, as both custom and law decreed. (Note: The two children were rapidly affianced by their father and sent away.) Louis assured Archbishop Samson that Eleanor's lands would be restored to her.

While Eleanor stated that the reason for the annulment was "for reasons of kinship with my Lord, Louis", the event fuelled speculation as to her behaviour and added to the growing legend. Equally without evidence are accounts of a distraught discarded wife.

== Remarriage and family (1152–1154) ==
Once again a single woman with possessions, Eleanor was at risk of abduction and forced marriage. This rapuit et abduxit was a common practice regarding heiresses, even in her own family. From Beaugency, she travelled south towards her court in Poitiers. On her route she narrowly evaded two kidnapping attempts. First, Count Theobald V of Blois attempted to capture Eleanor on the night of 21 March as she passed through Blois, but she escaped by taking a boat down the Loire to Tours. Theobald later married her daughter Alix, while his brother Count Henry I of Champagne married Alix's older sister, Marie. Geoffrey of Anjou lay in wait for Eleanor at Port-de-Piles, but she was warned at Tours of the plot and changed her route, arriving safely by boat at Poitiers.

As soon as she arrived in Poitiers, just before Easter, Eleanor sent envoys to Geoffrey of Anjou's older brother, Duke Henry of Normandy, asking him to come at once to marry her. Many authors conclude that this fulfilled a prior arrangement made at his earlier visit to the French court. While providing security for her Aquitaine lands, the choice of Henry also made political sense as Anjou lay on the northern border of Aquitaine, thus protecting it and enlarging her joint jurisdiction. She then set about revoking all acts and charters of Louis relating to Aquitaine and replacing them with her own. The message reached Henry at Lisieux on 6 April. Henry arrived in Poitiers in mid May and on 18 May 1152 (Whit Sunday), eight weeks after her annulment, Eleanor married the younger Henry in a quiet private ceremony at Poitiers Cathedral, thereby transferring her Aquitaine lands from Louis to Henry. The wedding was described as being "without the pomp and ceremony that befitted their rank". (Note: Translation is probably by Weir. Newburgh gives "pactum conjugale inierunt, minus quidem solemnitur ratione personarum" ("united by the conjugal tie, which was solemnized not very splendidly, in proportion to their rank").) They had kept the arrangements secret, for fear that Louis, who regarded the growing power of Henry and the Angevins with anxiety, would prevent it. (Note: By custom, vassals were supposed to request permission to marry from their overlords.)

Eleanor was related to Henry even more closely than she had been to Louis: they were cousins to the third degree through their common ancestor Ermengarde of Anjou (wife of Duke Robert I of Burgundy and Count Geoffrey II of Gâtinais), and they were also descended from King Robert II of France. (Note: A marriage between Henry and Eleanor's daughter Marie had earlier been declared impossible due to their status as third cousins once removed.) Her remarriage to Henry provided the next chapter of the legend of her scandalous behaviour, it being implied that she had a previous illicit relationship with him. (Note: Innuendos about Eleanor's sexuality formed part of contemporary views on women, power and its sexualisation.)

When Louis discovered Eleanor had married his archrival, and knowing Henry was also in line for succession to the throne of England, he was furious and immediately made preparations for war. He also refused to give up the title of duke of Aquitaine, which he had acquired through marriage to Eleanor and was now Henry's by the same right, for if Eleanor bore a male heir, his daughters would be disinherited. His subsequent invasion of Normandy marked the beginning of an Angevin-Capetian conflict that would last more than fifty years.

Eleanor now exercised independent power in her court and within her hereditary domains, striking new seals for her charters, both as duchess of Aquitaine and countess of Poitou, but also with the added titles of duchess of the Normans and countess of the Angevins. Within a month, Henry departed with the intention of pursuing his claim to the throne of England (Note: Henry's claim to the English throne was through his mother, Matilda, daughter and heir of Henry I of England. On the death of her father in 1135, Matilda's succession was challenged by her cousin Stephen of Blois, leading to a civil war that became known as the Anarchy (1135–1153).) but now had to deal with Louis's invasion of Normandy, which he easily repelled within six weeks, signing a truce, so that by the autumn of that year he was able to return to Aquitaine. To commemorate their marriage, Henry and Eleanor had a stained glass window installed at Poitiers Cathedral, in which they are represented, kneeling as donors. By late 1152, the couple moved to Rouen in Normandy and in January 1153 Henry finally set sail for England to challenge the claim of his cousin Stephen of Blois, who then held the throne. He did not return till March 1154, leaving the now pregnant Eleanor with his mother, Matilda, and his youngest brother, William. On 17 August 1153, Henry and Eleanor's first child, William, was born, most likely at Angers.

In England, Henry had finally fought King Stephen to a truce, and at the Treaty of Winchester in November 1153, it was agreed that Henry would be Stephen's heir and successor, and this was ratified at Westminster at Christmas. Upon Henry's return to his French domains, Eleanor again became pregnant. Meanwhile, Louis VII remarried, became reconciled with Henry and relinquished the title of duke of Aquitaine.

== Queen of England (1154–1189) ==
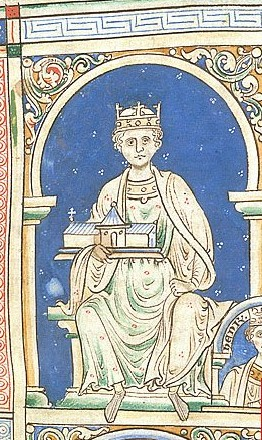
Henry II of England, drawn by Matthew Paris

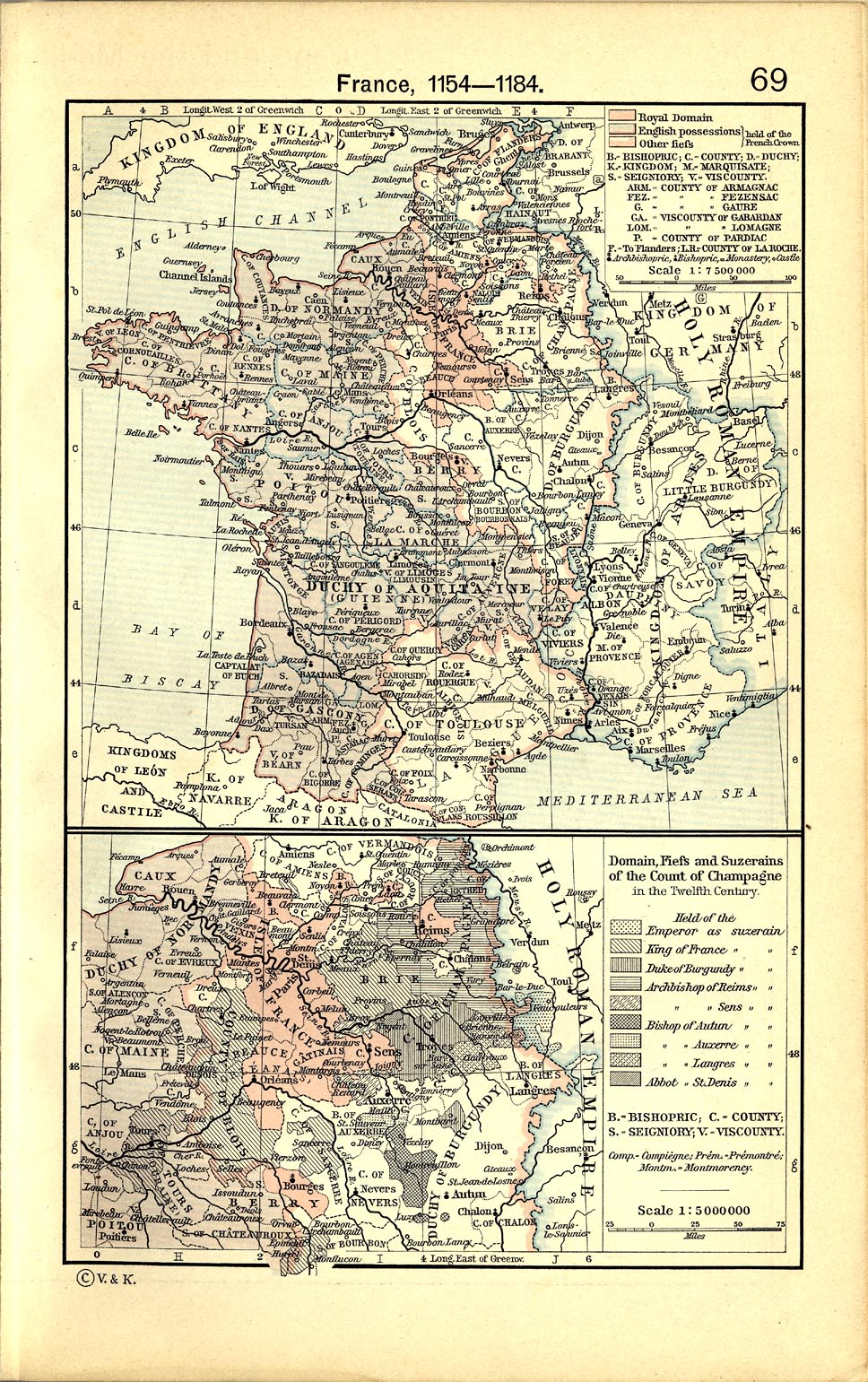
France 1154–1184 and the Angevin Empire

=== Queen and regent (1154–1173) ===
==== Early years in England (1154–1158) ====
On 25 October 1154, King Stephen died. Although Henry was immediately summoned to England, it was not until 7 December that he and Eleanor were able to cross the channel from Barfleur, landing near Southampton on the 8th. They travelled first to Winchester to greet Archbishop Theobald of Canterbury, who had been acting as regent. From Winchester, the royal party moved to London and were lodged at the royal palace at Bermondsey. On 19 December 1154, Theobald crowned Henry as King Henry II in Westminster Abbey, with Eleanor beside him. It is unclear whether Eleanor was actually crowned or anointed as well, since she had already been crowned queen of France in 1137. This was the beginning of the House of Plantagenet that would rule England till the end of the fifteenth century.

As queen of England, Eleanor was provided for generously by Henry, including multiple dowerlands and regular settlements of money that made her one of the richest people in the kingdom, earning her the title of "riche dame de riche rei". The chroniclers barely mention Eleanor during the reign of Henry II, other than to note when she was with the king, and biographies have been built on these itineraries and surviving official documents. She signed her official documents Latin: Alienor Dei Gracia Regine Anglorum, lit. 'Eleanor by the Grace of God Queen of England'. This was not uncommon, in that the activities of women were not thought to be of sufficient importance to report, they were merely Latin: regalis imperrii participes, lit. 'participants in the imperial kingship'. Furthermore, the independence and authority of queens had been progressively eroded prior to her ascension to the role. She participated with the king in ceremonial occasions, though she never learned English.

Henry's dominions stretched from the Scottish border to the Pyrenees, and he was frequently travelling through them, both in England and France and was absent from England far more than any of his predecessors. For much of his absences from court, Eleanor acted as either regent or co-regent with the justiciar. Although she sometimes accompanied Henry, she also travelled extensively throughout her domains on her own or with her children. While claims that she was an influential patron of the arts appear to be greatly exaggerated, many writers dedicated works to her. These include Robert Wace's Roman de Brut (c. 1155) and William of Blois, while other writers such as Marie de France and the author of Roman de Thebes are believed to have been inspired by her. Some writers, such as Marie de France, appear to associate her with the Arthurian Legends, while the more speculative Eleanor legends even associate her with the person of Guinevere.

On 28 February 1155, Eleanor gave birth to the couple's second child, Henry, during the king's absence. On 10 January 1156, King Henry left England for one of his many prolonged absences, leaving Eleanor pregnant again. It was during this absence, in the spring of 1156, that Prince William died and was buried at Reading Abbey, next to his great-grandfather Henry I. In June of that year, the couple's third child Matilda was born and Eleanor and her children travelled to France to be with Henry in July, returning in February 1157. Henry joined her in England in April, and on 8 September their fourth child, Richard, was born at Beaumont Palace. After 1156, Eleanor's autonomous rule of her duchy was much diminished, her name disappearing other than to confirm acts of Henry, for whom Aquitainians had little respect.

==== Toulouse campaign (1159) ====
Louis VII had remarried in 1154 to Constance of Castile, and by 1157 had a third daughter, Marguerite. Noting a seeming inability of Louis to produce a male heir, Henry II conceived of a plan to eventually acquire the French throne by marrying his son Henry to Marguerite and began making plans in 1158. He travelled to France in August to negotiate the terms with Louis and take the infant Marguerite into his care. He would remain away for over four years. Eleanor soon gave birth to a fourth son, Geoffrey, on 23 September 1158, and shortly afterwards she rejoined Henry in France. In 1159, she and Henry made a further unsuccessful attempt at enforcing her claims to Toulouse through her grandmother, thereby alienating Louis again, since Count Raymond V of Toulouse was both his vassal and now his relative. (Note: Louis had arranged for his widowed sister Constance to marry Raymond in order to protect the county from any plans of Eleanor and Henry. While accounts vary, this took place in 1154 or 1156.) Although Henry had formed a coalition to conquer Toulouse, Louis came to Raymond's aid. Amongst Henry's allies was Count Raymond Berengar IV of Barcelona. Henry symbolically tied the two dynasties by betrothing his son Richard to Raymond Berengar's daughter. (Note: Richard's betrothal was broken off when it was no longer a political expedient.) But by September Henry had been forced to a temporary truce, although this was the beginning of forty years of war between England and France. Eleanor sailed to England on 29 December, obtained funds for Henry's campaigns and escorted it to him in France before returning to England.

==== Later years in England (1159–1168) ====
It was not until September 1160 that Henry again summoned Eleanor and the children to be with him in France. Queen Constance had died that year, providing Louis with two daughters but no male heir, and he promptly arranged a third marriage to Adela of Champagne. Therefore, Henry II decided to immediately arrange for Prince Henry's marriage to Marguerite, despite their being only children. For this he obtained a special dispensation from the church, and the marriage proceeded on 2 November, unbeknownst to Louis. (Note: Since Louis and Eleanor's marriage had been annulled for consanguinity, the marriage between their children was also problematic. Further complicating this was the fact that Queen Adela was also related to Louis.) Eleanor remained in France and in September 1161 gave birth to a daughter, Eleanor, at Domfront, Normandy. (Note: The number of years between the birth of Geoffrey (1158) and Eleanor (1161) compared to Queen Eleanor's other pregnancies has given rise to speculation about the presence of another child. In his History of Great Britain (1611), John Speed states that Eleanor had a son named Philip, born sometime between 1158 and 1162, who died young. His sources no longer exist, and he alone mentions this birth.) Henry and Eleanor finally returned to England on 25 January 1163 after a prolonged absence, which also marked the end of her duties as regent in England.

February 1165 saw Henry back on the continent to arrange the marriages of their daughters Matilda and Eleanor to cement an alliance with Emperor Frederick Barbarossa. Eleanor joined him on 1 May, acting as his regent in Anjou and Maine. It was there that another daughter, Joanna, was born at Angers in October, although Henry was not there, having returned to England only two weeks after her arrival. During much of these times the royal couple saw very little of each other, Henry not joining Eleanor till she asked for his help in dealing with a potential revolt in March 1166. His conflict with Breton nobles was settled by betrothing Prince Geoffrey to Constance, daughter of Duke Conan IV of Brittany.

These long periods of separation would give rise to speculation and then rumours of Henry's infidelities, and a resultant rift between him and Eleanor. The most notorious of these stories was that of an affair with Rosamund Clifford. Henry's affair had become known by late 1166 and was acknowledged by 1174. Henry had a reputation for philandering; he fathered illegitimate children throughout the marriage. Eleanor appears to have taken an ambivalent attitude towards these affairs. Geoffrey of York, (Note: It is likely that Geoffrey was born before Henry and Eleanor were married. Some chroniclers confine accounts of his affairs to his youth and later years beyond Eleanor's child bearing.) for example, was an illegitimate son of Henry, but acknowledged by Henry as his child and raised at Westminster in the care of the Queen. (Note: Eleanor was well aware of her husband's infidelities, and this was even an expectation of the spouses of aristocrats.)

Following the birth of Princess Joanna, Eleanor remained at Angers. Henry did not join her for Christmas that year, only crossing to France in March 1166, where he would remain for another four years. The unprecedented separation at Christmas also led to speculation of discord, but Henry was with her by Easter that year, when she conceived their last child, John. After Easter, Eleanor returned to England, and Christmas 1166 was again spent apart, with John having been born on Christmas Eve. Eleanor did not join Henry in France till Christmas 1167, which they spent at Angers. This year also saw her bringing Matilda, then only eleven, to the continent in September in preparation for her marriage to the much older duke of Saxony, Henry the Lion, which took place on 1 February 1168.

Henry II's reign was marred by a bitter feud with Thomas Becket, which began in 1163. Becket was initially a close friend and adviser, then his chancellor and eventually archbishop of Canterbury. There has been some speculation as to what role Eleanor may have played in this, but very little evidence. During his exile in France from 1164, Becket unsuccessfully sought her help. What little evidence exists though, suggests that she urged reconciliation.

In December 1167, Eleanor gathered her movable possessions in England and transported them on several ships to Argentan. Christmas was celebrated at the royal court there, and immediately afterward she left for her own city of Poitiers. Henry and his army went with her before attacking a castle belonging to the rebellious Lusignan family. Henry then went about his own business outside Aquitaine, leaving Patrick, Earl of Salisbury, his regional military commander, as her protective custodian. When Patrick was killed in a skirmish with the Lusignans, Eleanor, who proceeded to ransom his captured nephew, the young William Marshal, was left in control of her lands. There she would remain until 1173, a move that facilitated Henry's control over a corner of his realm where the vassals were continually rebelling. This move also led to speculation of a marital breakdown.

By this time, King Louis and Queen Adela had finally had a son, Philip Augustus. Philip's birth in 1165 ended Henry II's attempts to add the throne of France to the Angevin empire through dynastic alliances.

==== Poitier years (1168–1173) ====
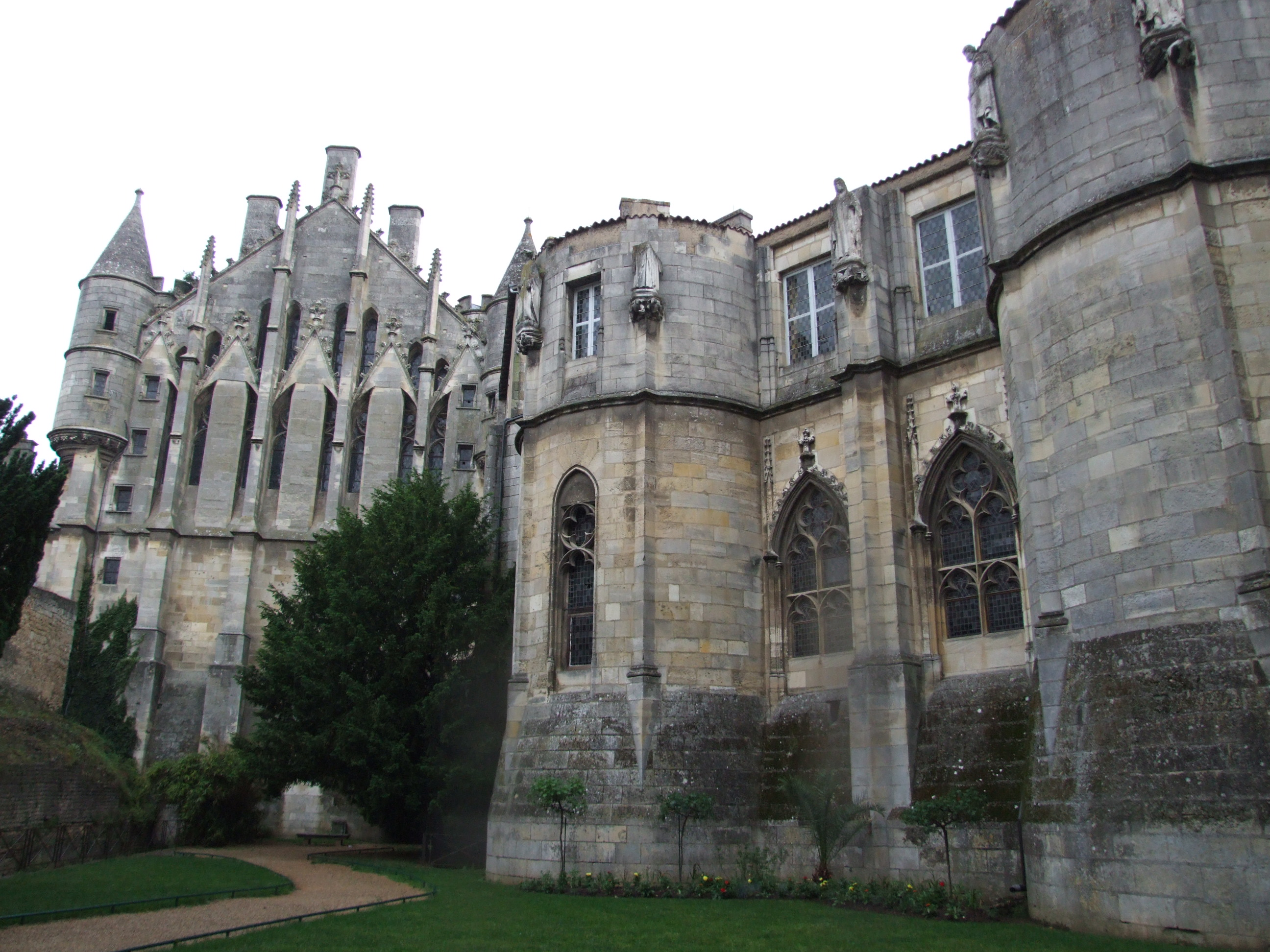
The Palace of Poitiers, the seat of the counts of Poitou and dukes of Aquitaine in the 10th through to the 12th centuries, where Eleanor's court inspired tales of the Court of Love.

The separation of Eleanor and Henry during the next five years has been the subject of much speculation as to whether it was predominantly a matter of political expediency, an indication of a growing rift between the couple or both. Certainly Eleanor had fulfilled her queenly duties of providing both male heirs and daughters as commodities for alliances, but was now too old to provide further children. She successfully set about restoring order in proverbially restless Aquitaine, and continued in her royal duties as Angevin queen, including acting as regent in various French territories. Richard of Devizes suggested it was Eleanor that initiated the separation and that Henry did not oppose it.

Although not much is known about Eleanor's whereabouts during this period, Christmas 1168 was spent apart, Henry at Argentan and Eleanor at Poitiers. On 6 January 1169, the king, joined by Princes Henry and Richard, met with Louis VII at Montmirail, Maine. In the resulting treaty, Henry II divided his domains between his sons and betrothed Richard to Louis' daughter Alys. (Note: Richard's prior betrothal with the Aragonese royal family had been previously dissolved.) In addition to keeping his vassals in order and maintaining relations with the French king, Henry was busy creating domestic alliances. Geoffrey was betrothed to Constance of Brittany and negotiations were begun to marry Joanna to William II of Sicily and John to Alicia, eldest daughter of Humbert III of Savoy. To further secure a peaceful succession, he sought to continue the Capetian tradition of crowning his heir, Prince Henry. Despite opposition from the Church, the prince was crowned on 14 June 1170, after which he was called Henry the Young King. While Eleanor and Henry appeared to be in communication during this period, it is not evident that they actually saw much of each other, (Note: Weir states they travelled together to Quercy in 1170, citing Robert de Torigny, but this appears to be a misreading of the text, since Torigny only mentions their daughter Eleanor in that passage, whereas everywhere else he is careful to document when she accompanied him, eg Rex Henricus ...cum regina Alienor.) other than at some of the major feasts, such as Christmas at Bur-le-Roi, near Bayeux, in 1170 (Note: This was the occasion when Henry allegedly uttered the words "Who will rid me of this turbulent priest?", resulting in the assassination of Thomas Becket on 29 December.) and at Chinon in 1172. While there were rumours of alienation between the couple, Eleanor began to exert increasing autonomy in ruling her duchy. For instance she changed her formal address to omit "the king's", merely stating "to her faithful followers".

During this period, relations between Henry II and his young sons became increasingly fractious. Having been allocated portions of the Angevin empire at Montmirail, they were eager to assume their powers, rather than wait for their father's death. Louis VII saw an opportunity to exploit these divisions. In November 1172, Louis invited his daughter Marguerite and son-in-law Henry to Paris, where he encouraged Young Henry's ambitions.

===== Courtly love, troubadours and the Golden Myth =====
Of all her influence on culture, Eleanor's time in Poitiers between 1168 and 1173 has been claimed to be the most critical, yet very little is actually known about it. Henry II was occupied with his own affairs after escorting Eleanor there. For a long time, writers dealing with this period stated that her court was a centre of chivalry and the troubadour culture. This evolved further into the tradition that Eleanor presided alongside her eldest child, Countess Marie of Champagne, over what became known as "The Court of Love", where courtly love thrived. While troubadours both attended her court and praised her, the Court of Love was a later literary invention. This emerged from a late 12th-century treatise known as The Art of Courtly Love, or Tractatus de amore et de amoris remedio by Andreas Capellanus, which appeared long after the period of Eleanor's court in Poitiers, and is largely satirical.

The Tractatus stated that Eleanor, together with her daughter Marie, Ermengarde of Narbonne, Isabelle of Vermandois and other ladies, would listen to the quarrels of lovers and act as a jury on questions of romantic love. He records some twenty-one cases, the most famous of them being a problem posed to the women about whether true love can exist in marriage. According to Capellanus, the women decided that it was not at all likely. There is no evidence for any of Capellanus' claims. Despite this, many popular accounts, such as the biography by Polly Schoyer Brooks, continue to give credence to it, at least as some sort of "parlor game".

There is no evidence to the claim that Eleanor invented "courtly love", an expression that only appeared in the late nineteenth century. The concept of courtoisie (amour courtois, fin'amor) was a set of attitudes regarding love associated with the courts and praised by troubadours that had begun to grow before Eleanor's Poitier period. What can be said, is that this fin'amor first appeared in the south in the early twelfth century, became popular and spread north, and that there were troubadours at Eleanor's court, such as Bernart de Ventadorn and Arnaut Guilhem de Marsan, as at other Occitan courts. The rest is merely conjecture. The legend of a court of love has formed an important element in what has been referred to as the "Golden Myth" of Eleanor's life.

=== Revolt and imprisonment (1173–1189) ===
==== Revolt and arrest (1173–1174) ====
From 21 to 28 February 1173, Henry and Eleanor were together at Montferrat for the betrothal of Prince John to Alice of Maurienne, who died shortly thereafter. The occasion was marred by open conflict between the two Henrys over the delegation of powers. From Montferrat, the royal entourage moved to Limoges, where matters worsened. The Henrys then headed north in March to Chinon, where they arrived on the 5th. In the morning, Henry II discovered his son had escaped his custody and travelled to Paris. Louis VII then informed Henry II that he was now supporting his son as the new reigning monarch. This was the beginning of the Revolt of 1173–1174.

Later chroniclers assigned much of the blame to Eleanor, adding to her deepening reputation and leading to much speculation regarding motive, despite lack of evidence, although they carefully added "so it was said" to their accounts. Other evidence implicates Louis VII, Young Henry's father-in-law. From Paris, William of Newburgh recounts, "the younger Henry, devising evil against his father from every side by the advice of the French king, went secretly into Aquitaine where his two youthful brothers, Richard and Geoffrey, were living with their mother, and with her connivance, so it is said, he incited them to join him." Roger of Hoveden gives a somewhat different account, stating that Eleanor sent the younger sons to France and their older brother "to join with him against their father the king." Young Henry and his brothers then returned to Paris in the spring and Eleanor encouraged her vassals to support her sons.

Later, in April, Eleanor too would set out to travel to Paris to join her sons. But she was seized on the road to Chartres and taken to Henry II in Rouen. (Note: Other accounts place Eleanor's flight to Paris after war broke out and as Henry II's forces approached Poitou, at a later date, in November 1173. The major source for her flight is Gervase of Canterbury.) The king did not announce the arrest publicly but had her confined, and for the next year the Queen's whereabouts were unknown. (Note: The most likely site of Eleanor's imprisonment is Chinon Castle.) Meanwhile, Louis held court in Paris, where the French nobles swore allegiance to Young Henry. Of Henry II's sons, only seven-year-old John remained with his father. Hostilities commenced in May, with the joined forces of Young Henry and Louis VII invading Normandy, although neither side prevailed during 1173. After a brief winter truce, Henry II entered Poitiers in May 1174, and took his daughter Joanna together with other noble ladies back to his stronghold in Normandy. On either 7 or 8 July 1174, Henry II, facing imminent invasion of England, took ship and sailed with Eleanor, John, Joanna and the other ladies from Barfleur to Southampton, from where Eleanor was taken to an unknown place of confinement. (Note: Eleanor may have been initially confined at either Winchester Castle or Sarum Castle, Salisbury. Turner favours the Salisbury site.)

==== Imprisonment (1173–1189) ====
While Henry II was ultimately victorious and made some concessions to his sons at the Treaty of Montlouis on 30 September 1174, Eleanor was confined to various degrees for the rest of Henry's life in various locations in England, about which there is very little information, although pipe rolls refer to Ludgershall Castle in Wiltshire, to Buckinghamshire and houses in Berkshire and Nottinghamshire. (Note: About four miles from Shrewsbury, close by Haughmond Abbey is a site known as "Queen Eleanor's Bower", though there is no known connection with Eleanor of Aquitaine.) Gerald of Wales states that Henry considered having his marriage annulled on the grounds of consanguinity during 1175, requesting a visit from a papal legate to discuss the matter and meeting with Cardinal Pietro Pierleoni at Winchester on 1 November. Pierleoni dissuaded him from this course. In early 1176, he tried again, by persuading Eleanor to become a nun at Fontevrault. She then requested the archbishop of Rouen to intervene and he supported her refusal, prompting Henry to once again attempt to seek papal approval, which was denied.

Meanwhile, Henry continued using his children to forge alliances. In the summer of 1176, Eleanor was at Winchester with Joanna, then eleven. Joanna was sent to Sicily on 27 August, as soon as plans for her marriage to William II were concluded, the marriage taking place on 13 February 1177. On 28 September 1176, John was betrothed to his cousin Isabella of Gloucester. In September 1177, Princess Eleanor left for Castile and was married to King Alfonso VIII in Burgos, while Geoffrey was married to Constance of Brittany in July 1181.

While Eleanor remained confined, she was not strictly a prisoner, but rather in a form of "house arrest", although stripped of her revenues. She enjoyed some greater freedoms from 1177 onwards and particularly after 1184, and would witness the deaths of three of her children (Henry, Matilda and Geoffrey), but very little information exists about these years. During her imprisonment, Eleanor became more and more distant from her sons, since Henry II could not afford having her in communication with them and possibly plotting against him. This was especially so for Richard, her heir in Aquitaine, who had always been her favourite. She did not have the opportunity to see her sons very often during her imprisonment, though she was released for special occasions such as Easter 1176.

Rosamund Clifford died in 1176 or 1177 at Godstow, Oxfordshire. Henry erected a tomb in the abbey and gave gifts to the abbey in her memory. Her death would much later lead to myths concerning Eleanor's putative involvement (Note: The alleged murder of Rosamund by Eleanor is depicted in the 1858 portrait of Eleanor by Frederick Sandys.) that grew more elaborate over the centuries, and for a long time were accepted as established facts, further building her Black Legend, despite virtually no contemporary evidence to support this.

Some chroniclers, including Gerald of Wales, Ralph Niger, Roger of Hoveden and Ranulf Higden state that Henry then began an affair with the sixteen-year-old Alys of France, a matter complicated by the fact that she was betrothed to his son Richard and was also the daughter of Louis VII, who became alarmed on hearing this news. In the meantime, Henry delayed the marriage, which Richard was now resisting.

The years of Eleanor's confinement were marked by almost constant warfare, as her sons fought against rebellious vassals (especially in Aquitaine), among each other and with their father. The situation became further complicated after 1180, with the death of Louis VII and the succession of his son Philip II. Philip was even more determined than his father to regain the French lands of Henry II and his sons. He sought to exploit their familial conflicts.

During one of these campaigns, Eleanor's son Henry died of dysentery on 11 June 1183, at Martel, at age twenty-eight. His dying wishes included a plea for his mother to be set free and that his wife Marguerite be provided for. Henry II sent the archdeacon of Wells, Thomas Agnellus, to Eleanor at Sarum to inform her of her son's death. Thomas later described how she told him she had a premonition in a dream. In 1193, she related to Pope Celestine III how much she was tortured by her memories of her son. Young Henry's death changed the family dynamics, leaving Richard as the new heir.

As a result of Young Henry's death and his wish for Marguerite's lands to be protected, Henry II found himself in conflict with Philip II of France, Marguerite's half-brother. Philip claimed that certain properties in Normandy and England belonged to Marguerite, but Henry insisted that they had once belonged to Eleanor and would revert to her upon her son's death. It was therefore politically expedient that Eleanor be seen in the disputed territories and Henry summoned her to Normandy in late summer 1183. This marked the beginning of a loosening of the restrictions on her. Roger of Hovenden states that the king commanded she "be freed and that she make a progress about her dowerlands". Her income also improved. Geoffroy du Brueil states that she remained in Normandy for about six months.

Young Henry's death necessitated a renegotiation of the treaty of Montmirail and the contentious question of Richard's betrothal to Alys, resulting in a further meeting of the English and French kings at Gisors, Normandy on 6 December 1183, at which time Henry revoked much of the land concessions he had made earlier. Eleanor returned to England in early 1184, where her daughter Matilda and son-in-law Henry (now in exile) were able to stay with her at Winchester and then Berkhamsted. On 30 November at Westminster, Eleanor and Henry presided over another unsuccessful attempt to bring peace with their warring sons and settle their inheritance, and the family spent Christmas at Windsor. In early 1185, they journeyed to Normandy, where a further family council took place in May. She would remain in Normandy for nearly a year, the royal couple returning to Southampton from Barfleur on 27 April 1186, spending the summer together at Winchester, though her whereabouts are largely unknown from then till 1189. However, even in Aquitainian affairs, it was clear she had little freedom to act, stating that her acts were "with the assent and at the will of her lord Henry, King of England, and of Richard, Geoffrey and John, her sons". The family situation changed further when Geoffrey died in Paris on 18 or 19 August 1186, leaving only Richard and John as heirs but conflict between them and with their father continued over their inheritance, and Richard made yet another attempt at adding Toulouse to the Aquitaine domain, bringing Henry and Philip into direct conflict, leading to twenty-seven years of intermittent war. This time Richard and Philip combined their forces against an ailing Henry, forcing him to relinquish much of his French possessions. After John joined this alliance against his father, Henry's health deteriorated further and he died at Chinon on 6 July 1189, aged fifty-six. At around this time, Eleanor also received news of Matilda's death.

Over the last few years Eleanor had often travelled with her husband and was sometimes associated with him in the government of the realm, but still had a custodian. Henry's death ended a marriage which has been described as tumultuous and Eleanor's long years of imprisonment.

== Widow and queen mother (1189–1204) ==
=== Richard I (1189–1199) ===
==== Release from prison and regency (1189) ====
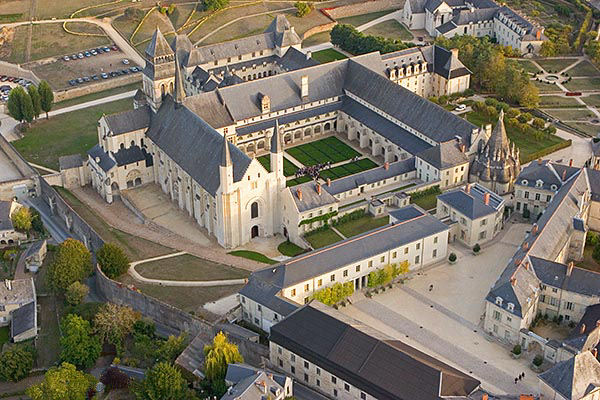
Fontevraud Abbey

Upon the death of Henry II on 6 July 1189, Richard I was the undisputed heir. One of his first acts as king was to send William Marshal to England with orders to release the sixty-five-year-old Eleanor from prison; he found upon his arrival that her custodians had already released her, whereupon she assumed the powers of regent, bestowed upon her by Richard, (Note: Statuendi quae vellet in regno) who was still in France. Eleanor then rode to Westminster and received the oaths of fealty from the lords and prelates on behalf of the new king. She ruled England in Richard's name, now signing herself "Eleanor, by the grace of God, (Note: "By the grace of God" was a title first used by Henry II in 1172.) Queen of England", and reversed many of Henry II's acts.

==== Third Crusade and journey to Italy (1189–1191) ====
On 13 August 1189, Richard sailed from Barfleur to Portsmouth and was received with enthusiasm, proceeding from there to Winchester to meet Eleanor. At this time, Eleanor's two surviving sons were unmarried, raising questions about succession. However, on 29 August, Prince John married his cousin Isabella, to whom he had been betrothed in 1176. On 3 September Richard was crowned at Westminster Abbey, with Eleanor and John in attendance. Richard was preoccupied with a long planned participation in the Third Crusade, and on his first absence from the kingdom in November on a pilgrimage, appointed Eleanor regent. On his return he made more formal arrangements, prior to his more prolonged departure for the crusade on 12 December, appointing as custodians his justiciar Hugh de Puiset together with William de Longchamp as summi justifiarii. (Note: In regimine regni) Although Eleanor had no formal appointment in England during this time, they deferred to her authority. On 2 February 1190, Eleanor joined Richard at the Chateau of Bures, Normandy, and a family conclave was held at Nonancourt with John in attendance at which arrangements for the administration of England in the king's absence were finalised.

Meanwhile, although John had married, the question of succession still remained, and in particular the problem of Richard's betrothed, Alys, who was Philip II's half-sister and with whom Henry II had had an affair. It was during the spring of 1190 that negotiations began with the Navarrese House of Jiménez regarding Berengaria, daughter of King Sancho VI of Navarre, though such an alliance would require the approval of Philip in breaking Richard's betrothal to Alys. Such an alliance would serve the purpose of stabilising matters in Gascony. However, Richard and Philip finally departed on their crusade on 4 July 1190. Once Richard had set off, Eleanor sent John to England while she travelled to Navarre, meeting Berengaria and Sancho at Pamplona. From there, she escorted Berengaria to Sicily, where Richard had arrived at Messina. In Messina, Richard found that his sister Joanna, widowed since November 1189, was being held prisoner. He was also in conflict with Philip, partly over the matter of Alys, as a result of which Eleanor's ship was refused landing at Messina and had to proceed to Brindisi. By March 1191, Richard had secured Joanna's release and joined Eleanor and Berengaria at Reggio. The king then placed Berengaria in Joanna's care. Richard confronted Philip with the matter of Alys' relationship with Henry II as the reason for breaking the betrothal, and Philip promptly departed for the Holy Land prior to the arrival of Eleanor in Messina.

By the time Eleanor had reached Sicily, stories of misrule and conflict in England between Longchamp and John had emerged. Walter de Coutances, archbishop of Rouen, was appointed to reestablish royal authority in England, and he and Eleanor began their return journey after only four days, departing on 2 April 1191 for Salerno. From there they travelled to Rome, arriving on the 14th to meet with the new pope, Celestine III, to obtain his approval of appointing Walter de Coutances over William de Longchamp, who also served as a papal legate.

On 10 April 1191, Richard, Berengaria and Joanna left Sicily, with the women on a separate ship, bound for Outremer, but storms diverted them to Cyprus, where Richard and Berengaria were married on 12 May at Limasol, and Berengaria was crowned. They then sailed to the Holy Land on 5 June, arriving at Acre on the 8th, which Richard captured. Philip abandoned the Crusade on 2 July and returned to France, but in the meantime Richard had found himself in conflict with Duke Leopold V of Austria, an event which would have serious consequences for him later.

==== Normandy and the struggle for power (1191–1192) ====
Once Eleanor reached Rouen, where she arrived on 24 June 1191, she was able to direct affairs in England better, although she spent the winter of 1191–1192 in France. Eleanor's new role softened the criticisms she had accumulated. As regent, she demonstrated the qualities of a benevolent and statesmanlike ruler, with Richard of Devizes describing her as "incomparable" (Note: Regina Alienor, femina incomparibilis) and she began using the phrase teste me ipsa (as my own witness) on official documents. In England, while Coutance tried to restore order, Longchamp was eventually deposed and Prince John began to consolidate power, claiming he was the heir presumptive. Coutance was appointed head of a regency council and Longchamp fled to France, attempting unsuccessfully to recruit Eleanor to his cause. Her position became more complicated with Philip II's return from the Holy Land in late 1191, who not only attempted to undermine Richard's reputation but demanded the return of Alys, still in Eleanor's care. In early 1192 Philip recruited John to his cause, offering him lands and Alys, prompting Eleanor's return to England on 11 February to prevent John's invasion of Normandy, but she spent much of that year dealing with ecclesiastical disputes and successfully curbing the ambitions of Longchamp and John.

==== Raising a ransom and restoration of Richard I (1192–1194) ====
In the Holy Land, Richard made little progress in his quest to capture Jerusalem, and by late 1192 was forced to arrange a truce with Saladin, and sent Joanna and Berengaria back to Sicily in September, departing from Acre himself on 9 October. His whereabouts were unknown till January 1193, when Eleanor learned that he had been taken prisoner by Duke Leopold, whom he had slighted on his arrival in Acre. Richard had travelled north from Trieste through Hungary, but when he crossed into Austria, he was recognised, apprehended and taken to Dürnstein Castle. Leopold informed Emperor Henry VI, who wrote to Philip II of France. Philip supported this turn of events. Eleanor only became aware of what had happened through Coutances' spies in France, but immediately assumed control of the government. Prince John, with Philip's support, became emboldened once more in claiming the throne. Leopold handed over his prisoner to the Emperor in February, and he was moved to the castle of Trifels, while Eleanor unsuccessfully sought the intervention of the Pope. (Note: Eleanor's three letters to the Pope have been cited at length, including her description of being wasted away by grief (consumptis carnibus). Aleonora, Angliae Regina, Papae opem miserabiliter implorat pro liberatione Regis Anglorum Richardi filii sui AD 1193 A.4. R.1. ff.) Eventually a truce was concluded with John in April, but Eleanor also received a demand from the Emperor for 100,000 silver marks (Note: The ransom was roughly equivalent to twice the annual revenue of the whole of England. Turner gives a higher figure of 150,000, which was negotiated later in June.) and the provision of hostages for Richard's release. At the same time she received the first letter from him since his capture, urging her to accept the terms, and informing her that his conditions had much improved and that he had been transferred to Hagenau. (Note: There is no evidence to support the popular legend that Richard's location was "discovered" by a troubadour named Blondel.)

Eleanor and her council immediately set about trying to raise the ransom and arrange the hostages, a task to which Beregnaria, now in Poitou. contributed, largely through taxation of all of Richard's territories and subjects. The first installment of 100,000 marks was delivered in October and the balance was raised by December. Having agreed to a date for Richard's release on 17 January 1194, Eleanor and Coutances set off for Germany in December 1193, arriving at Speyer by the agreed day. There she discovered that Philip and John had outbid her in return for keeping Richard in custody. Further negotiations and offers, including an annual tribute, led to him being released on 4 February. They immediately began their return, via Cologne, eventually arriving in Antwerp, where they boarded the Trenchemer in the Scheldt to avoid the French, landing in Sandwich on 12 March. Richard and Eleanor then made a triumphal entry into London on 23 March 1194.

==== Return to France and retirement (1194–1199) ====
Eleanor and Richard's stay in England was relatively brief. Richard departed from Portsmouth on 12 May 1194, feeling the need to defend his French possessions from Philip. Arriving in Barfleur, neither Richard nor Eleanor would return to England. There, they effected a reconciliation with John that would last through the rest of Richard's reign, leaving the latter free to defend his territory against Philip, while Eleanor, now seventy-two, retired to Fontevrault and there is very little information available about her for the next few years, though she made the abbey her principal residence for the rest of her life. The marriage of her daughter Joanna to Raymond VI of Toulouse in October 1196 finally ended Eleanor's dynastic claims on Toulouse, which now passed to Joanna. Richard was in a state of almost perpetual war with Philip following his return to Normandy in 1194 and finally succumbed to a wound on 6 April 1199 at the age of forty-one, with Eleanor at his side.

Initially, prior to arriving in England, Richard delegated authority to Eleanor statuendi quae vellet in regno, though this was not repeated. During Richard's subsequent prolonged absences, royal authority in England was represented by a succession of chief justiciars. On Longchamp's dismissal in 1191, government moved to a more conciliar mode (magnum concilium and communitas regni) under Coutance.

=== King John (1199–1204) ===
Richard and Berengaria had no children, and when he died, one of the first things Eleanor did was to warn John to flee from Brittany, where he was with his nephew Duke Arthur I of Brittany, and secure Richard's possessions. Arthur was the only son of Eleanor's fourth son Geoffrey and his wife Constance. He had been considered Richard's heir, being the son of John's older brother, and hence had a claim on the throne, there being no other male heirs. Richard himself had declared John to be his successor. Philip II was quick to exploit the possibility of an Angevin succession war, proclaiming the twelve-year-old Arthur as the new king of England. Arthur swore allegiance to Philip for his French possessions, whereupon the Breton army advanced on Angers and captured it, followed by Anjou, Maine and Touraine declaring their allegiance to Arthur. Eleanor immediately acted to repel the Bretons, ordering the devastation of the lands of any vassal disloyal to John. Support for Arthur soon collapsed, he withdrew with Philip to Paris and John was officially invested as duke of Normandy on 25 April 1199, while Eleanor toured all her domains raising support for John, whom she had declared the rightful heir. John arrived in England on 25 May and was crowned king on 27 May, although he was back in Normandy by 20 June, where he concluded a truce.

Eleanor also made peace with Philip and pledged her allegiance as a vassal. (Note: It was a most unusual step at that time or a woman to pledge allegiance for her lands.) She had come to an arrangement with John, whereby she would officially declare him her heir and cede her French possessions to him, while retaining her right to them during her lifetime, as his domina. This helped to safeguard them from Philip in the event of her death. John and Isabella had no children, and he needed an heir to secure the succession, so he had his marriage annulled in 1199. In September that year Joanna died in childbirth, at Fontevrault, where she was buried, leaving Eleanor with only two surviving children. Despite their truce, conflict between John, Arthur and Philip continued intermittently, until a further arrangement was put in place at Le Mans sometime after Christmas 1199. Among other provisions, the new truce cemented dynastic alliances through the marriage of the twelve-year-old Louis, Philip's heir, to one of John's Castilian nieces and the payment of 30,000 marks by John to Philip. This was formalised in the Treaty of Le Goulet of May 1200. Subsequently, John returned to England to raise the money, while Eleanor travelled to Castile to select a suitable bride. On the way, one of her vassals, Hugh IX of Lusignan, kidnapped her just south of Poitiers. Hugh demanded she cede him the County of La Marche, which one of his ancestors had previously sold to Henry II. She acceded so that she could complete her mission. She arrived in Castile by the end of January 1200.

Eleanor of Castile had two unmarried daughters, of whom her mother chose the younger, Blanche. The English queen remained in Castile until late March to avoid Lent, during which marriages could not be solemnised, arriving in Bordeaux at Easter on 9 April. Travelling on to the Loire, she entrusted Blanche to the archbishop of Bordeaux, who escorted her to meet John, while Eleanor once more returned to Fontevrault. While there, she undertook a major reconstruction of her ducal palace in Poitiers, originally Merovingian but now being rebuilt in the Angevin style. (Note: This included building the hall, that formed part of the Palais de Justice until 2019.)

Blanche and Louis were married on 23 May 1200. They had twelve children, one of whom was the future Louis IX of France, ensuring that Eleanor's descendants would be future rulers of France. John visited Eleanor at Fontevault in the early summer, hearing she was unwell. Amongst the advice she gave him was to secure the loyalty of her vassals, should she die, and in particular Hugh of Lusignan. John arrived at Lusignan Castle on 5 July, where he encountered the thirteen-year-old Isabella of Angoulême and sought her hand in marriage from her parents, while breaking off negotiations with the Portuguese court. However, Isabella was already betrothed to Hugh, whom he had dispatched to England. While there were potential political advantages to such an alliance, under the circumstances this was a mistake that would soon have serious consequences.

The marriage between John and Isabella took place in secret in Bordeaux on 24 August. They then proceeded to England, where she was crowned queen at Westminster Abbey on 8 October 1200. John ignored the Lusignans' protests over the betrayal, whereupon they rose in rebellion in early 1201. Eleanor, though in ill health, once more intervened to restore peace in February and March, summoning her grandson Arthur as an intermediary with Philip. But John continued to seek vengeance on the Lusignans, and conflict simmered throughout 1201.

On 28 April 1202, freed from some of his other commitments, Philip summoned John to his court, and upon his refusal, declared him a traitor and in lieu of his lands. John's position became more perilous when Philip betrothed his daughter Marie to the fifteen-year-old Arthur in July, and declared him to be the rightful lord of the Angevin possessions. Under Philip's orders, Arthur proceeded to Poitou to seize his new inheritance. This prompted Eleanor to set out for Poitiers from Fontevrault, but on the way found herself besieged by Arthur and Hugh in Mirebeau Castle, near the Angevin border. She refused demands to yield up control of the fortress and urgently summoned John to aid her. John received the news on 30 July and reached Mirebeau on 1 August where he found that the defences were already breached, but was able to lift the siege, release Eleanor and take both Arthur and the Lusignans into his custody. Arthur was last seen entering Falaise Castle in Normandy as a prisoner on 10 August. Eleanor had demanded a promise of clemency for Arthur, but little was heard of him for some time, despite an attempt to free him in the autumn of 1202. On her return to Fontevrault, Eleanor took the veil as a nun.

By the end of 1202, rumours were circulating about Arthur's death, but John had the youth brought before him in January 1203 at Falaise, asking him to switch his allegiance from Philip. Instead, Arthur demanded that John grant to him all his possessions, according to Philip's declaration. Arthur's threats were sufficient for some of the king's advisers to suggest he be eliminated as a danger to the security of the realm. Rumours of his assassination persisted and subsequent events have been the subject of speculation, other than that he was transferred to Rouen on 8 March, and in April, his gaoler announced he was relinquishing his role, the last record of his existence. John was commonly blamed for Arthur's disappearance and found himself increasingly isolated over the spring of 1203. This provided an opportunity for Philip, who progressively annexed Normandy throughout the rest of the year. For his part, John left for England to muster support on 6 December. The French and Breton conquest of Normandy continued in early 1204, with most of the significant strongholds captured by the end of March. It is unclear if Eleanor was aware of the progressive destruction of the empire she and Henry II had ruled and which she had fought to preserve for her sons. One source from Fontevrault suggests that she had become unaware of her surroundings at some point during the last few months of her life.

== Death and interment (1204) ==
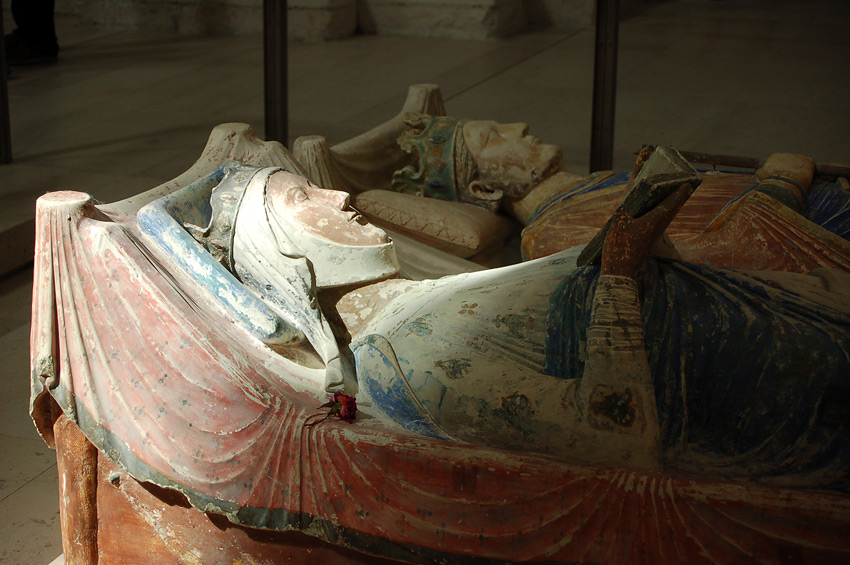
Tomb effigies of Eleanor and Henry II at Fontevraud Abbey in central France

Eleanor died at Fontevraud (Note: Some chroniclers suggest Eleanor died at Poitiers.) on either 31 March or 1 April 1204 and was entombed in the crypt of the abbey between Richard I and Henry II. Eleanor's tomb lies under a painted stone gisant (effigy) of the Queen, wearing a crown and with an open book in her hands. The tomb is considered one of the finest of those few that survive from this period. During the French Revolution, the abbey was sacked and the tombs vandalised, while the human remains were exhumed and scattered and have never been located.

== Appearance ==
Contemporary sources praise Eleanor's beauty. Even in an era when ladies of the nobility were excessively eulogised and praised, their praise of her was undoubtedly sincere, though probably based on hearsay, while in some cases, the reference is only implied. The medieval German songs known as Carmina Burana praise "England's Queen". Benoit de Sainte-Maure wrote of the "Queen of Beauty and largesse" in the Roman de Troie, while Philippe de Thaun wrote "God save Lady Eleanor, Queen, who is the arbiter of honour, wit and beauty". When she was young, she was described as perpulchra—more than beautiful. When she was around 30, Bernard de Ventadour, a noted troubadour, called her "gracious, lovely, the embodiment of charm", extolling her "lovely eyes and noble countenance" and declaring that she was "one meet to crown the state of any king". William of Newburgh emphasised the charms of her person, and even in her old age Richard of Devizes described her as beautiful, while Matthew Paris, writing in the 13th century, recalled her "admirable beauty", a common practice at the time, and "a woman of wonderful appearance, more beautiful than moral". Richard of Devizes was similarly exuberant, but not all were in agreement. William of Tyre dismissed her as "uxorem quae una erat de fatuis mulieribus". (Note: A wife who was of the foolish women) The History of William the Marshal describes her as avenante, vaillante, courtoise.

Depictions of Eleanor of Aquitaine

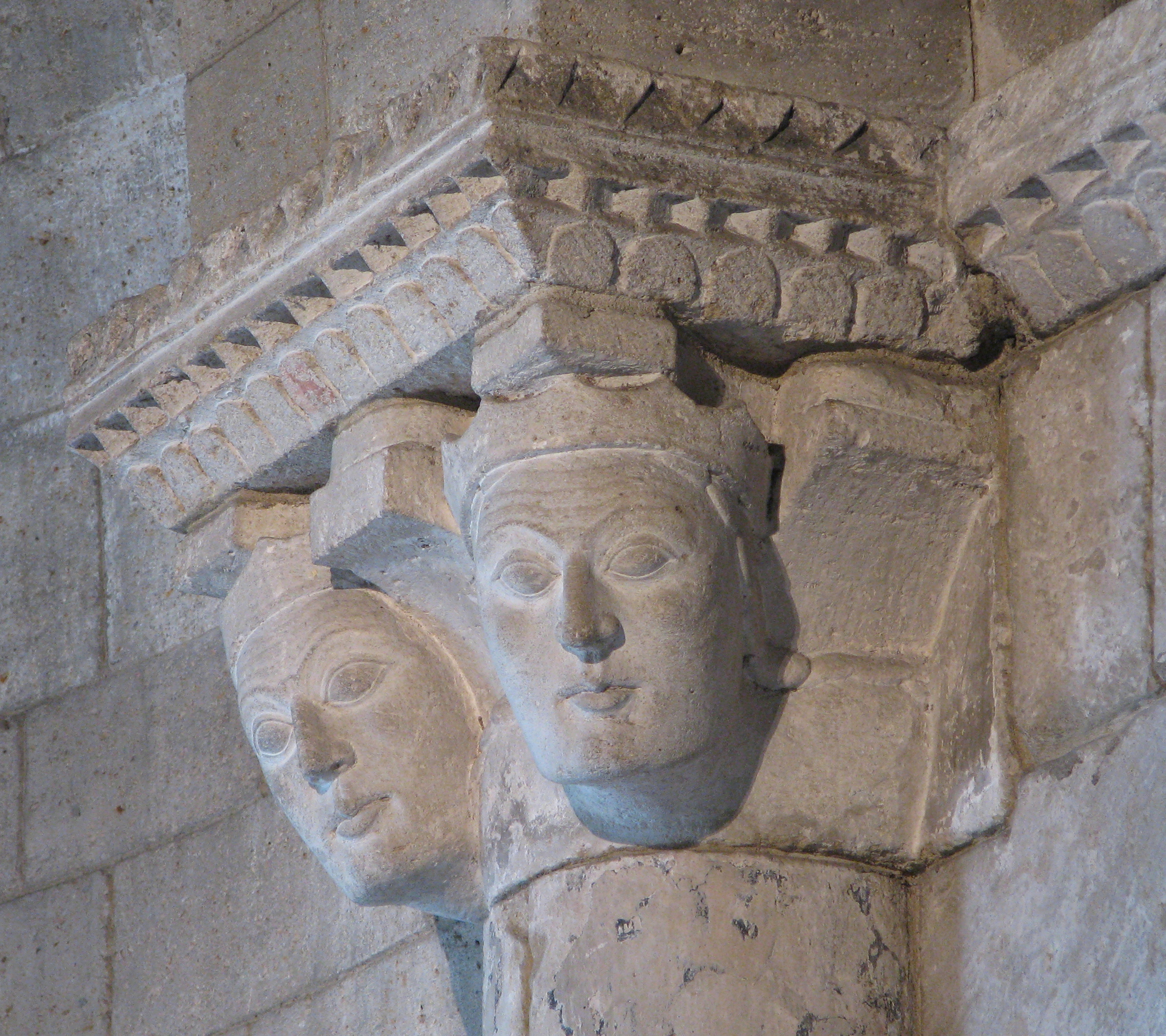
12th-century capital carving ascribed to Eleanor and Henry (Note: Langon Chapel, Cloisters, Metropolitan Museum, wrongly attributed to Eleanor and Henry for a long time, but actually a common feature of Romanesque architectural carving.)

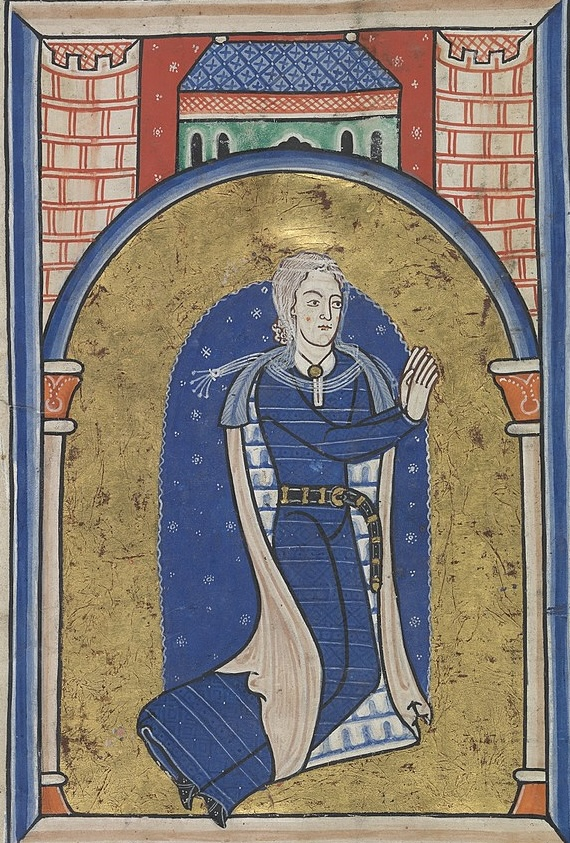
12th-century donor portrait
Psalter, Royal Library of the Netherlands

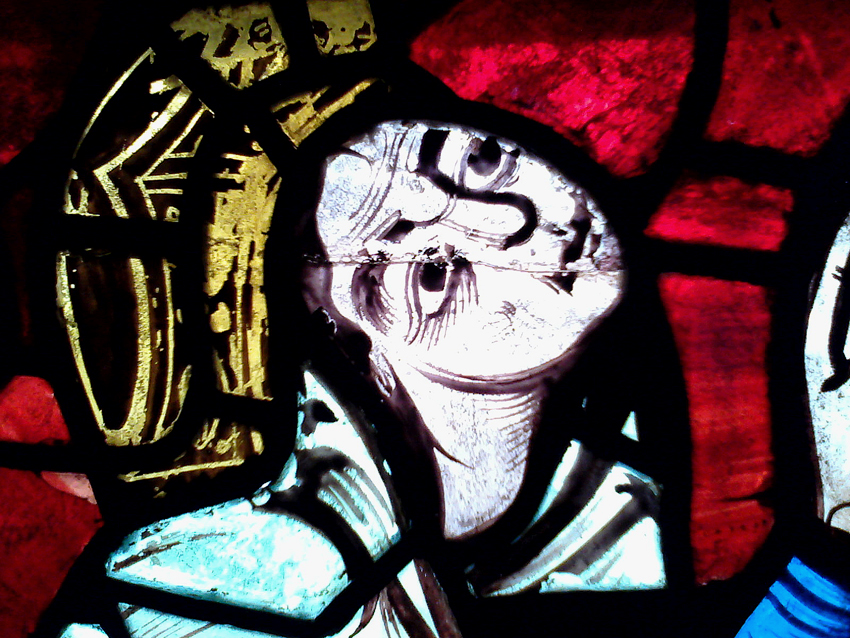
Stained glass window, Poitiers Cathedral, said to represent Eleanor

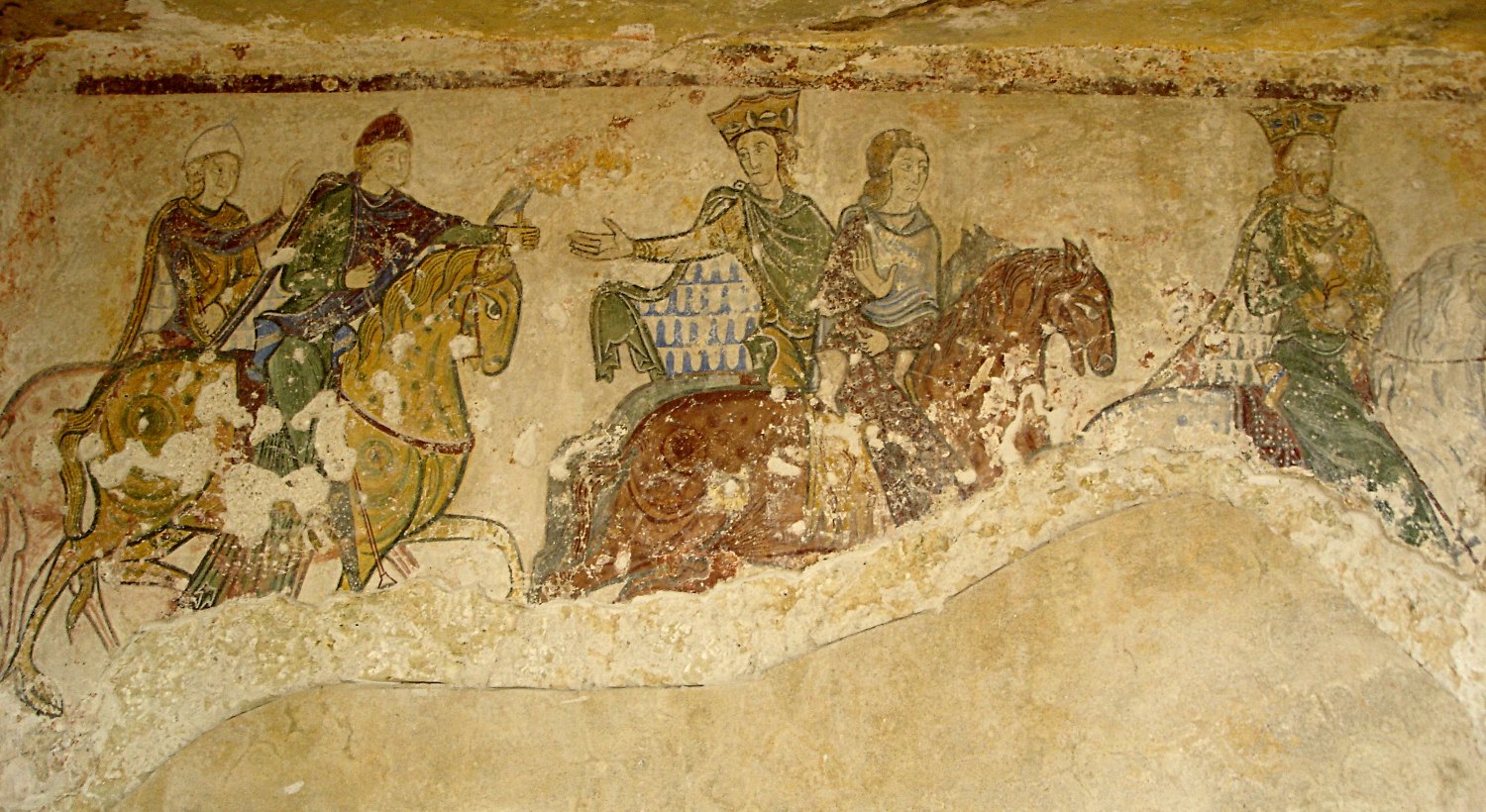
Mural, Chapelle Sainte-Radegonde, Chinon. The figure on left of central group had been alleged to be Eleanor.

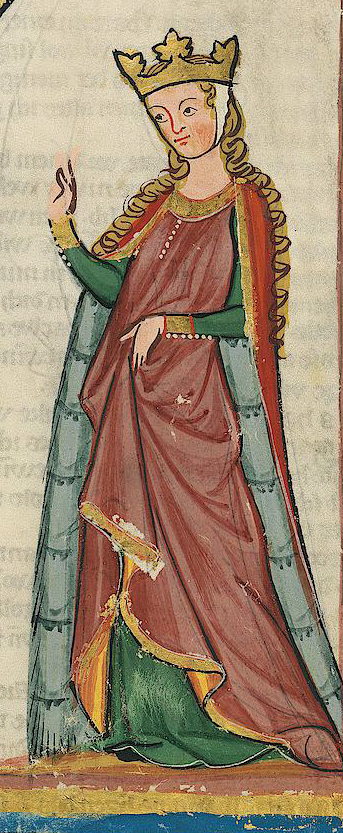
Queen from 14th-century Codex Manesse (Note: The Codex Manesse queen has frequently and erroneously been attributed as Eleanor.)

No one left a detailed description of Eleanor. For instance, the colour of her hair and eyes are unknown. Such details were of little interest to contemporary chroniclers, with portraiture of the time making no attempt at realism, while descriptions were largely rhetorical. However, many biographers have attempted to describe her, and Elizabeth Chadwick dismisses all these as fantasy or based on misinformation. (Note: For example, Marion Meade bases her description on a letter from Bernard of Clairvaux. Yet the actual letter refers only to queens in general "The ornaments of a queen" and makes no mention of Eleanor.) The effigy on her tomb (almost certainly not a true portrait) shows a tall and large-boned woman with brown skin. Her seal of c. 1152 shows a woman with a slender figure, but these were impersonal images intended to convey authority.

== Legacy ==
Eleanor's descendants ruled various realms, and her grandchildren included kings Henry III of England, Henry I of Castile, Richard of Germany and Henry of Jerusalem, queens Berengaria of Castile and Blanche of France, and Holy Roman Emperor Otto IV. In England, the rule of her husband Henry's House of Plantagenet ended in 1485, with the death of Richard III.

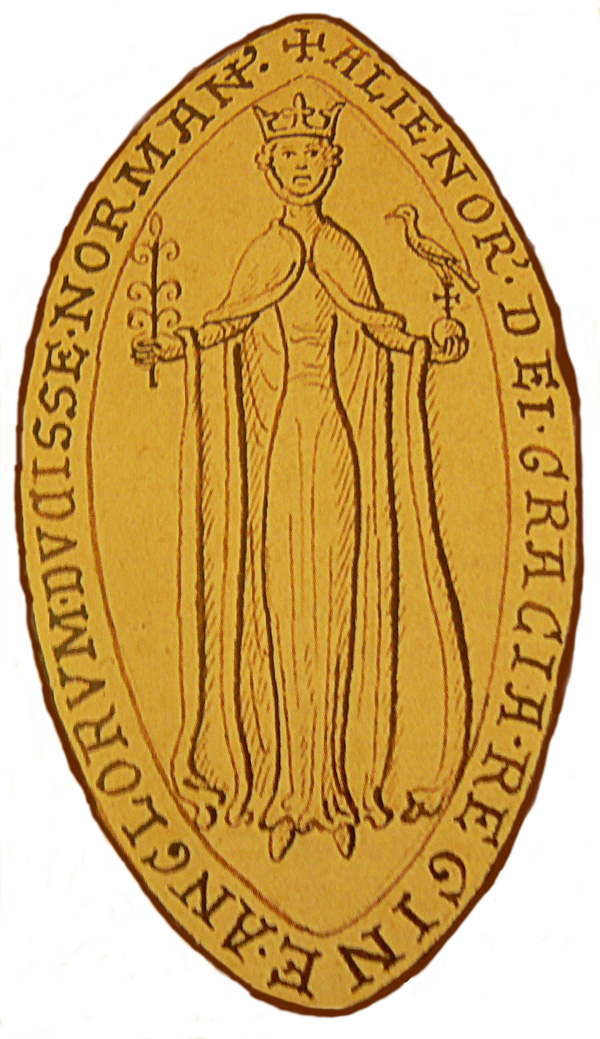
Seal of Eleanor displaying her style (in Latin) as "Eleanor by the Grace of God, Queen of the English, Duchess of the Normans"

Eleanor's life has inspired a large canon of literature, reflected in popular culture. This has varied considerably from scholarly research to romantic fictionalised history. Nicholas Vincent writes that this includes "the very worst historical writing devoted to the European Middle Ages" and concludes that "the Eleanor of history has been overshadowed by an Eleanor of wishful-thinking and make-believe". Legends about her started during her lifetime and rapidly grew, and much of it appears in the chronicles of the late twelfth century which constitute almost all that is known of her. Most of these paint her in an unfavourable light, yet none are actually first hand accounts. Many of the accounts of her life are composed "so distant in time and place" from the events as to have little credence, and chroniclers were more concerned with their messages than an accurate setting out of facts. These messages were often laden with ideology that in Eleanor's case was largely negative. The aspects of her life most valued by modern romanticisation were those her contemporary commentators found most unacceptable in her position. Most of these were clerics, like William of Tyre, John of Salisbury, Mathew Paris, Helinand de Froidment and Aubri des Trois Fontaines and based their assessments on "the common talk of the day". In this way, gossip and rumour, often prefaced by ut dicibatur (as it was said) became included in the records of the times and then into later histories and biographies. Among modern biographies, one of the first by Amy Kelly (1950), while relying on literary sources but not historical records is "legend focussed" and highly romanticised in a way that cannot be substantiated. In the absence of much reliable information about Eleanor herself, biographers have largely focused on the people around her and the political and cultural events of her time.

=== Art ===
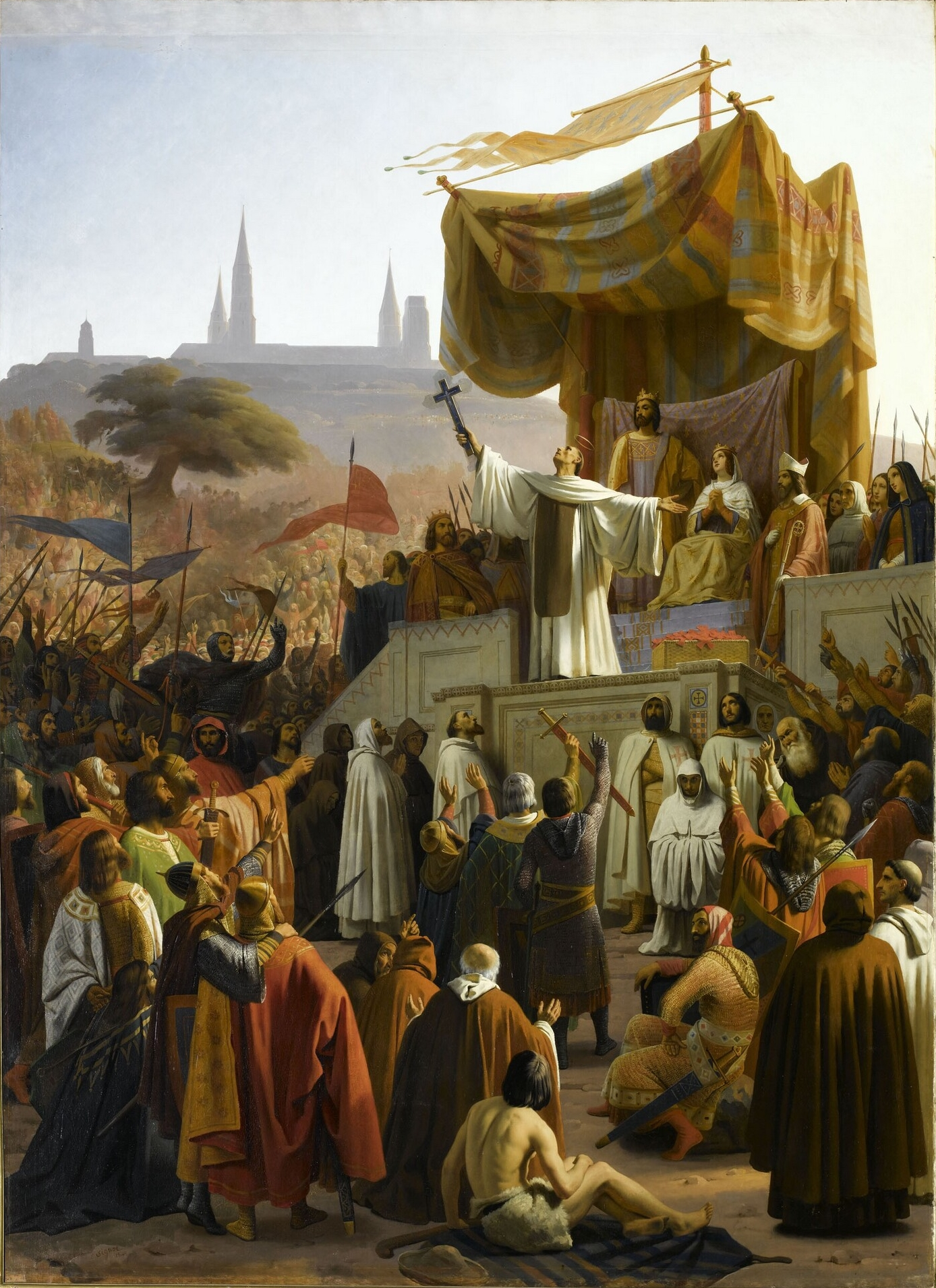
Saint Bernard preaching the Second Crusade by Emile Signol, 1839. Chateau de Versailles

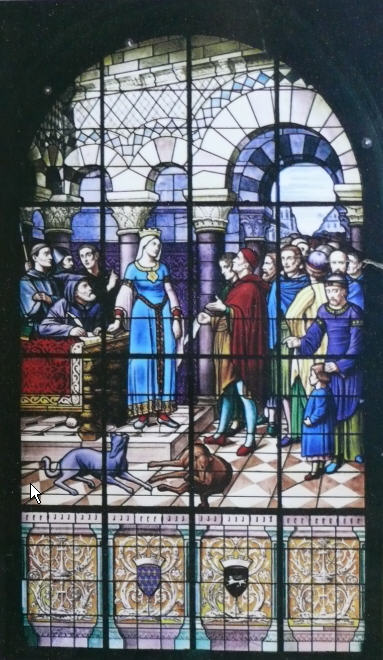
Eleanor issuing charter to Poitiers in 1199, by Steinhal (Town hall, late 19th c.)

Images of Eleanor are common, but since none dates from her lifetime, these are purely speculative. Some Romanesque-style carvings, such as those at the Cloisters in New York and Chartres and Bordeaux cathedrals, have been attributed to her but these cannot be substantiated, while completely erroneous claims from medieval art have frequently been used to illustrate articles and books about her, such as a queen from the 14th-century Codex Manesse. (Note: The Codex Manesse image was used as the cover of some editions of Alison Weir's biography.) The stained glass window in Poitiers Cathedral with a donor portrait of Eleanor is not original but a nineteenth-century restoration by Adolphe Steinheil. Two of the commonest claims have been the fresco in the chapel of at St. Radegonde at Chinon and a donor portrait of a kneeling woman in a twelfth-century psalter, which has led to it becoming known as the Eleanor Psalter.

In France, the Salles des Croisades at Versailles, opened in 1843, showed two 1839 paintings including Eleanor—St Bernard preaching the second crusade in the presence of King Louis VII and Queen Eleanor of Aquitaine by Emile Signol, and King Louis VII takes the Oriflamme by Jean-Baptiste Mauzaisse. In both, Eleanor is depicted in prayer. (Note: A third painting from the Salles des Croisades, by Franz Winterhalter, entitled Eleanor de Guyenne prend la croix avex les dames de sa cour, from 1839 was subsequently removed and has been lost.) In contrast, British paintings including Frederick Sandys's Queen Eleanor (1858) and Edward Burne-Jones's Fair Rosamund and Queen Eleanor (1861 and 1862), depict her as a melodramatic murderess, coincident with the popularity of the Fair Rosamond story, which in itself led to a series of art works. In the twentieth century, similar works appeared by Herbert Sidney (1905), Evelyn De Morgan (1905), John William Waterhouse (1916) and Frank Cadogan Cowper (1920). (Note: A possible exception to the Rosamund theme is Edmund Blair Leighton's painting The Accolade (1900) in which Eleanor is seen as an authority figure. However, there is doubt as to whether the queen actually is Eleanor. Despite the lack of evidence, it appears as a book cover (Le Lit d'Alienor), as do many other dubious portraits) Judy Chicago's installation The Dinner Party (1979) features a place setting for Eleanor. She was also commemorated on a French €0.50 postage stamp in 2004, the 800th anniversary of her death.

=== Fiction and poetry ===
Fictionalised accounts of Eleanor include Jean Plaidy's 1987 autobiographical The Courts of Love. Norah Lofts also wrote a fictionalized biography of her in 1955, including some romanticized episodes—starting off with the young Eleanor planning to elope with a young knight, who is killed out of hand by her guardian, in order to facilitate her marriage to the king's son. Kristiana Gregory wrote a fictionalised diary, Eleanor: Crown Jewel of Aquitaine (The Royal Diaries series, 2002).

Eleanor also features in the works of many historical novelists. These include The Merry Adventures of Robin Hood (1883) by Howard Pyle (instead of the ballad's Queen Catherine) and F. Marion Crawford's novel of the second crusade Via Crucis (1899). She is the subject of A Proud Taste for Scarlet and Miniver, a 1973 children's novel by E. L. Konigsburg, and Margaret Ball's Duchess of Aquitaine (2006).

In Sharon Kay Penman's Plantagenet novels, she figures prominently in When Christ and His Saints Slept (1995), Time and Chance (2002), and Devil's Brood (2008). In Penman's historical Justin de Quincy mysteries, Eleanor, as Richard's regent, sends squire Justin de Quincy on various missions, often an investigation of a situation involving Prince John. The four published mysteries are the Queen's Man (1996), Cruel as the Grave (1998), Dragon's Lair (2003), and Prince of Darkness (2005). Other novels include Elizabeth Chadwick's Eleanor trilogy The Summer Queen (2013), The Winter Crown (2014), and The Autumn Throne (2016). Ariana Franklin features Eleanor in her Adelia Aguilar twelfth-century mysteries. She is also a character in Matrix by Lauren Groff (2021).

Eleanor is an allegorical figure in Ezra Pound's Cantos.

=== Drama, film, radio and television ===
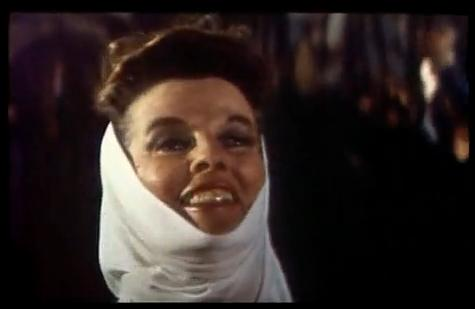
Katharine Hepburn as Eleanor of Aquitaine in The Lion in Winter (1968), a role for which she won the Academy Award

=== Film ===
Eleanor has featured in a number of screen versions of the Ivanhoe and Robin Hood stories: She has been played by Martita Hunt in The Story of Robin Hood and His Merrie Men (1952), Jill Esmond in The Adventures of Robin Hood (1955–1960), Phyllis Neilson-Terry in Ivanhoe (1958), Yvonne Mitchell in The Legend of Robin Hood (1975), Siân Phillips in Ivanhoe (1997), Tusse Silberg in The New Adventures of Robin Hood (1997), Lynda Bellingham in Robin Hood (2006), Eileen Atkins in Robin Hood (2010) and most recently by Connie Nielsen in Robin Hood (2025).

Eleanor was played by Mary Clare in Becket (1923), and by Pamela Brown in the 1964 Becket.}} and Katharine Hepburn played Eleanor in the 1968 film The Lion in Winter. (Note: Hepburn won the third of her four Academy Awards for Best Actress in 1969 for The Lion in Winter. She also won the BAFTA Award for Best Actress in a Leading Role and was nominated for the Golden Globe Award for Best Actress – Motion Picture Drama. Peter O'Toole played Henry II in both The Lion in Winter and Becket.)

=== Television ===
- Una Venning played her in the Sunday Night Theatre television version of Shakespeare's The Life and Death of King John in 1952
- Eleanor was played by Prudence Hyman in Richard the Lionheart (1962)
- Eleanor was played by Jane Lapotaire in The Devil's Crown (1978)
- Mary Morris played her in the BBC Shakespeare version of Shakespeare's The Life and Death of King John in 1984.
- Glenn Close and Patrick Stewart played Eleanor and Henry in the The Lion in Winter (2003).

=== Theatre ===
- Eleanor is a character in Shakespeare's The Life and Death of King John.
- Eleanor (as Eleonora di Guienna) appeared in Gaetano Donizetti's opera Rosmonda d'Inghilterra (1834).
- She and Henry II are the main characters in James Goldman's 1966 play The Lion in Winter. The play deals with the difficult relationship between the monarchs and the struggle of their three sons Richard, Geoffrey, and John for their father's favour and the succession. The role was created on Broadway by Rosemary Harris.

=== Music ===
- Eleanor of Aquitaine is thought to be the chunegin von Engellant (Queen of England) mentioned in the 12th century poem "Were diu werlt alle min," in Carl Orff's Carmina Burana.
- Queen Eleanor's Confession, a traditional 17th-century Child Ballad, is a fictional account.
- Flower and Hawk is a monodrama for soprano and orchestra, written by American composer Carlisle Floyd in 1972, in which Eleanor relives memories of her time as queen.

=== Miscellaneous ===
- Mike Walker's BBC Radio 4 series Plantagenet (2010).
- In the 2014 film Richard the Lionheart: Rebellion, Eleanor is played by Debbie Rochon.
- In the BBC Radio 4 Eleanor Rising Rose Basista plays Eleanor and Joel MacCormack plays Louis (2020–2022). These and other dramatic accounts have helped to perpetuate the Golden Myth image of Eleanor.
- Eleanor appeared as a playable leader in Sid Meier's Civilization VI for both England and France. She was added in the Gathering Storm expansion.

== Genealogy ==
=== Ancestors ===
Eleanor of Aquitaine's ancestors
Notes:
Dashed lines indicate non-marital union
Dotted lines indicate marriage
Coloured boxes indicate line of consanguinity between Eleanor and Louis

Robert II of France c. 972–1031	Constance of Arles c. 986–1032
Anne of Kiev c. 1030–1075	Henry I of France; 1008–1060	Pons of Toulouse; 1019–1060	Almodis of La Marche c. 1020–1071	Robert of Mortain c. 1031–1095	Matilda of Montgomery d. 1085	William V of Aquitaine; 969–1030	Agnes of Burgundy c. 995–1068	Robert I of Burgundy; 1011–1076	Ermengarde of Anjou c. 1018–1076	Archimbaud Borel; 1019–1083	Amabilis of l'Isle Bouchard; 1023–1084	Eon of Blaison; 1028–	Tcheletis of Trèves; 1028–	Hugues I of Châtellerault; 1008–1075	Gerberga Rochefoucauld c. 1030–1058–	Aimery of Thouars c. 1017–1093	Auremgarde Mauleon; 1017–1069
Philip I of France c.1052–1108	William IV of Toulouse; 1040–1094	Emma of Mortain; 1058–1080	William VIII of Aquitaine; 1025–1086	Hildegarde of Burgundy; 1056–1104	Bartholomew of l'Isle Bouchard; 1049–1097	Gerberge of Blaison; 1053 – c. 1082	Boson II of Châtellerault c. 1050–1092	Aleanor of Thouars c. 1055–1093
Louis VI of France; 1081–1137	Philippa of Toulouse; 1073–1118	William IX of Aquitaine; 1071–1126	Dangereuse of l'Isle Bouchard; 1079–1151	Aimery I of Châtellerault; 1075–1151
William X of Aquitaine; 1099–1137	Aénor of Châtellerault; 1103–1130
m.(1) 1137–1152; Louis VII of France; 1120–1180	Eleanor of Aquitaine; 1124–1204	m.(2) 1152; Henry II of England; 1133–1189	Aélith of Aquitaine; 1125–1151	Aigret of Aquitaine; 1126–1130

=== Consanguinity ===
Consanguinity of Capetian and Angevin lines
Note: Coloured boxes indicate lines of descent from Robert of France and Constance of Arles

Robert II of France c. 972–1031	Constance of Arles c. 986–1032
Henry I of France; 1008–1060	Adela of France; 1009–1079	Robert I of Burgundy; 1011–1076
Philip I of France; 1052–1108	Matilda of Flanders c. 1031–1083	Constance of Burgundy; 1046–1093	Hildegarde of Burgundy c. 1056–1104
Louis VI of France c. 1081–1137	Henry I of England c. 1068–1135	Urraca of León and Castile c. 1080–1126	William IX of Aquitaine; 1071–1126
Empress Matilda c. 1102–1167	Alfonso VII of León and Castile; 1105–1157	William X of Aquitaine; 1099–1137
m.(1) 1137–1152; Louis VII of France; 1120–1180 m.(2) 1154–1160	m.(1) 1137–1152; Eleanor of Aquitaine; 1124–1204 m.(2) 1152
m. 1152; Henry II of England; 1133–1189
m. 1154–1160; Constance of Castile c. 1136–1160

=== Family relationships ===
Eleanor's relatives

Pons of Toulouse; 1019–1060	Almodis of La Marche c. 1020–1071
William IV of Toulouse; 1040–1094	Emma of Mortain; 1058–1080	Raymond IV of Toulouse; 1041–1105
Philippa of Toulouse; 1073–1118	William IX of Aquitaine; 1071–1126	Bertrand of Toulouse died 1112	Alfonso Jordan of Toulouse; 1103–1148	William the Conqueror c. 1028–1087
Humbert II of Savoy; 1065–1103	William X of Aquitaine; 1099–1137	Aénor of Châtellerault; 1103–1130	Raymond of Poitiers c. 1105–1149	Henry I of England c. 1068–1135	Adela of Normandy c. 1067–1137	Stephen of Blois c. 1045–1102
Amadeus III of Savoy; 1095–1148	Adelaide of Savoy; 1092–1154	Louis VI of France c. 1081–1137	Empress Matilda c. 1102–1167	Theobald II of Champagne; 1090–1152	Stephen of England c. 1045–1102
m.(1) 1137–1152; Louis VII of France; 1120–1180	Eleanor of Aquitaine; 1124–1204	m.(2) 1152; Henry II of England; 1133–1189	Aélith of Aquitaine (Petronilla); 1125 – c. 1151 m. 1142–1151	m.(1) 1125–1140; Ralph I of Vermandois c. 1085–1152 m.(2) 1142–1151	Eleanor of Champagne; 1102–1147 m. 1125–1140

=== Issue ===
Eleanor had ten children, and outlived eight of them.

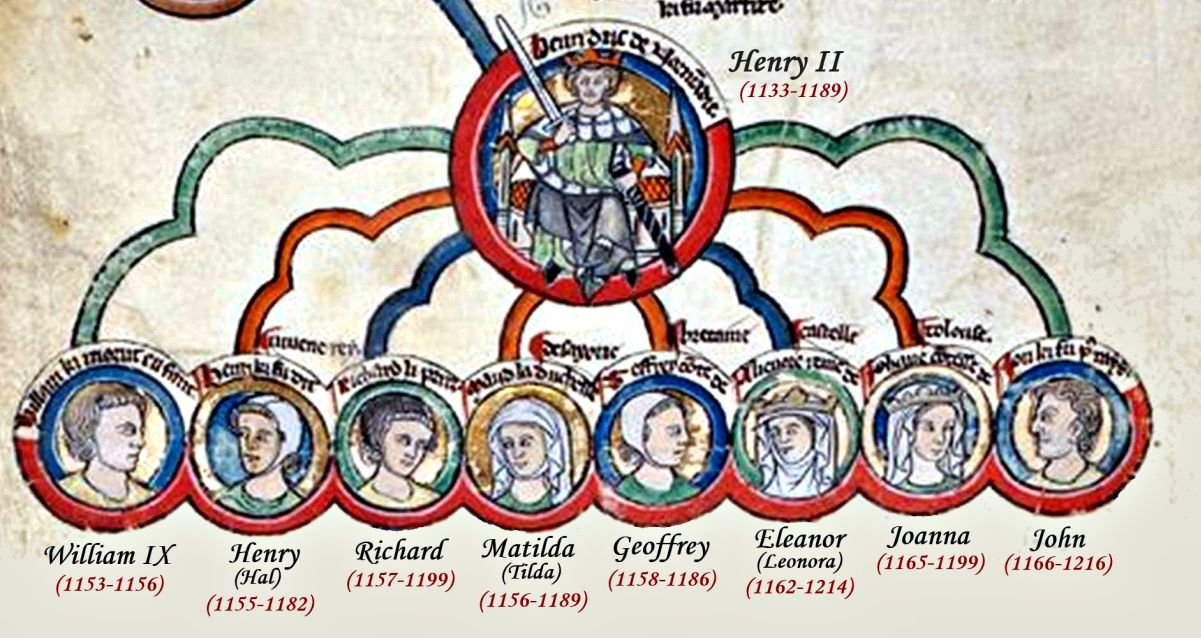
Children of Eleanor and Henry, with modern captions

Name	Birth	Death	Marriage(s)
By Louis VII of France (married 12 July 1137, annulled 21 March 1152)
Marie, Countess of Champagne	1145	11 March 1198	married Henry I, Count of Champagne; had issue, including Marie, Latin Empress
Alix, Countess of Blois	1150	1198	married Theobald V, Count of Blois; had issue
By Henry II of England (married 18 May 1152, widowed 6 July 1189)
William, Count of Poitiers	17 August 1153	April 1156	died in early childhood
Henry the Young King	28 February 1155	11 June 1183	married Margaret of France; no surviving issue.
Matilda, Duchess of Saxony and Bavaria	June 1156	13 July 1189	married Henry the Lion, Duke of Saxony and Bavaria; had issue, including Otto IV, Holy Roman Emperor
Richard I, King of England	8 September 1157	6 April 1199	married Berengaria of Navarre; no issue
Geoffrey II, Duke of Brittany	23 September 1158	19 August 1186	married Constance, Duchess of Brittany; had issue
Eleanor, Queen of Castile	13 October 1162	31 October 1214	married Alfonso VIII of Castile; had issue, including Henry I, King of Castile, Berengaria, Queen Regnant of Castile and Queen of León, Urraca, Queen of Portugal, Blanche, Queen of France, Eleanor, Queen of Aragon
Joan, Queen of Sicily	October 1165	4 September 1199	married 1) William II of Sicily 2) Raymond VI of Toulouse; had issue
John, King of England	24 December 1166	19 October 1216	married 1) Isabella, Countess of Gloucester 2) Isabella, Countess of Angoulême; had issue, including Henry III, King of England, Richard, King of the Romans, Joan, Queen of Scotland, Isabella, Holy Roman Empress

== See also ==
- House of Plantagenet
- Angevin Empire
- Capetian dynasty
- House of Capet
- Grandmother of Europe, sobriquet of Eleanor of Aquitaine and others
- List of longest-reigning monarchs

== Sources ==
=== Books ===
- Aurell, Martin (2005). "Aux origines de la légende noire d'Aliénor d'Aquitaine". In Allirot, Anne-Hélène; Lecuppre, Gilles; et al. (eds.). Royautés imaginaires, XIIe–XVIe siècles: actes du colloque organisé par le Centre de recherche d'histoire sociale et culturelle (CHSCO) de l'Université de Paris X-Nanterre, 26 et 27 septembre 2003 (in French). Turnhout: Brepols. pp. 89–102. ISBN 978-2-503-51916-6.
- — (2007) [20003 Paris, Perrin]. The Plantagenet Empire, 1154–1224 [L'Empire des Plantagenêts (1154–1224)]. Translated by David Crouch. Taylor & Francis Group. ISBN 978-1-138-14994-6.(Excepts available here)
- Barber, Richard (2005). "Eleanor of Aquitaine and the media". In Bull, Marcus Graham; Léglu, Catherine (eds.). The World of Eleanor of Aquitaine: Literature and Society in Southern France Between the Eleventh and Thirteenth Centuries. Woodbridge: Boydell Press. pp. 13–27. ISBN 978-1-84383-114-3.
- Berman, Constance Hoffman (2018). The White Nuns: Cistercian Abbeys for Women in Medieval France. University of Pennsylvania Press. ISBN 978-0812250107.
- Berman, Harold J. (2009). Law and Revolution, the Formation of the Western Legal Tradition. Cambridge: Harvard University Press. ISBN 978-0-674-02085-6.
- Black, Joseph; et al., eds. (2015) [2006]. "Love and marriage in medieval Britain: Andreas Capellanus, The Art of Courtly Love". The Medieval Period. The Broadview Anthology of British Literature. Vol. 1 (3rd ed.). Peterborough, Ontario: Broadview. pp. 389–391. ISBN 978-1-77048-554-9.
- Boyle, David (2006). Blondel's Song: The capture, Imprisonment and Ransom of Richard the Lionheart. London: Penguin Books Limited. ISBN 978-0-14-190142-8.
- Phillips, Jonathan (2003). "Odo of Deuil's De profectione Ludovici VII in Orientem as a source for the second crusade". In Bull, Marcus Graham; Housley, Norman (eds.). The Experience of Crusading. Vol. 1. Western Approaches. Cambridge University Press. pp. 80–95. ISBN 978-0-521-81168-2.
- Dunbabin, Jean (2000) [1985]. France in the Making 843–1180 (2nd ed.). Oxford: OUP. ISBN 978-0-19-158830-3.
- Dunn, Caroline (2013). Stolen Women in Medieval England: Rape, Abduction, and Adultery, 1100–1500. Cambridge University Press. ISBN 978-1-107-01700-9.
- Elvins, Mark Turnham (2006). Gospel Chivalry: Franciscan Romanticism. Leominster: Gracewing. ISBN 978-0-85244-664-5.
- Fawtier, Robert (2021) [1960 Macmillan]. The Capetian Kings of France: Monarchy & Nation, 987–1328 [Les Capétiens et la France 1941]. Translated by L Butler & R J Adam. London: Creative Media Partners, LLC. ISBN 978-1-01-516610-3.(Available here at Internet Archive)
- Firnhaber-Baker, Justine (2024). House of Lilies: The Dynasty That Made Medieval France. Basic Books. ISBN 978-1-5416-0477-3.
- Evergates, Theodore (2016) [1992]. "Louis VII and the Counts of Champagne". In Gervers, Michael (ed.). The Second Crusade and the Cistercians. New York: Springer. pp. 109–108. ISBN 978-1-137-06864-4.
- Facinger, Marion (2008) [1996]. "A study of medieval queenship: Capetian France 987–1237". In Dahood, Roger; Medine, Peter E. (eds.). Studies in Medieval and Renaissance History. Vol. 5. Los Angeles: AMS Press. pp. 1–48. ISBN 978-0-404-64555-7.
- Gillingham, John (2002) [1999]. Richard I. New Haven: Yale University Press. ISBN 978-0-300-09404-6.
- Graham-Leigh, Elaine (2005). The Southern French Nobility and the Albigensian Crusade. Woodbridge: Boydell Press. ISBN 978-1-84383-129-7.
- Herdam, Ayaal; Smallwood, David J (2020). "The Queen from the South: Eleanor of Aquitaine as a Political Strategist and Lawmaker". In Gilleir, Anke; Defurne, Aude (eds.). Strategic Imaginations: Women and the Gender of Sovereignty in European Culture. Leuven: Leuven University Press. pp. 159–180. ISBN 978-94-6270-247-9.(Available here at Project Muse)
- Hahn, Scott (2012). The Kingdom of God as Liturgical Empire: A Theological Commentary on 1–2 Chronicles. Grand Rapids: Baker Books. ISBN 978-0-8010-3947-8.
- Tolhurst, Fiona (2020). "Catty Queen Consort, Lioness in Winter and Loyal Quen Mother: Images of Eleanor of Aquitaine in film". In Harty, Kevin J. (ed.). Medieval Women on Film: Essays on Gender, Cinema and History. Jefferson, North Carolina: McFarland. pp. 163–181. ISBN 978-1-4766-3900-0.
- Hodgson, Natasha (2007). Women, Crusading and the Holy Land in Historical Narrative. Woodbridge: Boydell. ISBN 978-1-84383-332-1.
- Horton, Ros; Simmons, Sally (2007). Women Who Changed the World. Quercus. ISBN 978-1-84724-026-2.
- Houts, Elisabeth Van (2016) [1999 Macmillan]. Memory and Gender in Medieval Europe, 900–1200. Springer. ISBN 978-1-349-27515-1.
- Jasperse, Jitske (2020). Medieval Women, Material Culture, and Power: Matilda Plantagenet and Her Sisters. Arc Humanities Press. ISBN 978-1-64189-146-2.(Available here at Project Muse)
- Jones, Dan (2013). The Plantagenets: The Kings who made England. London: William Collins. ISBN 978-0-00-721394-8.(Searchable here at Internet Archive)
- Martínez Diez, Gonzalo (2007). Alfonso VIII, rey de Castilla y Toledo (1158–1214). Gijón: Ediciones Trea. ISBN 978-84-9704-327-4.
- Pacaut, Marcel [in French] (1964). Louis VII et son royaume (in French). Paris: S.E.V.P.E.N.
- Pernoud, Régine (1975) [1972 Albin Michel]. Blanche of Castile [La Reine Blanche]. Translated by Henry Noel. New York: Coward, McCann & Geoghegan. ISBN 978-0-698-10595-9.(Available here at Internet Archive)
- Richardson, Douglas (2011). Plantagenet ancestry : a study in colonial and medieval families. Internet Archive. Douglas Richardson. ISBN 978-1-4499-6631-7.(Available here at Internet Archive)
- Seel, Graham E. (2012). King John: An Underrated King. London: Anthem Press. ISBN 978-0-8572-8518-8.
- Siberry, Elizabeth (2016). The New Crusaders: Images of the Crusades in the 19th and Early 20th Centuries. Abingdon: Routledge. ISBN 978-1-351-88519-5.
- Spiegel, Gabrielle M. (1993). Romancing the Past: The Rise of Vernacular Prose Historiography in Thirteenth-Century France. Berkeley: University of California Press. ISBN 978-0-520-91556-5.
- Terrell, Carroll F. (1993) [1980]. A Companion to The Cantos of Ezra Pound. Berkeley: University of California Press. ISBN 978-0-520-08287-8.(Available at ResearchGate or searchable at Internet Archive)
- Turner, Ralph V.; Heiser, Richard (2000). The Reign of Richard Lionheart, Ruler of the Angevin Empire, 1189–1199. Harlow: Longman. ISBN 978-0-5822-5659-0.
- Vincent, Nicholas (2006). "Patronage, Politics and Piety in the charters of Eleanor of Aquitaine". In Aurell, Martin; Tonnerre, Noël-Yves (eds.). Plantagenêts et Capétiens, confrontations et héritages (in French). Turnhout, Belgium: Brepols. pp. 17–60. ISBN 978-2-503-52290-6.
- Vones-Liebenstein, Ursula (2016). "From Aquitaine to Provence: The struggle for influence during the schism of 1130". In Doran, John; Smith, Damian J. (eds.). Pope Innocent II (1130–43): The World vs the City. Abingdon: Routledge. pp. 152–171. ISBN 978-1-317-07831-9.

==== Historical sources ====
- Berry, Virginia Gingerick, ed. (1948). Odo of Deuil: De Profectione Ludovici VII in Orientem. Columbia University Press.(see Odo of Deuil)
- Bouchet, Jean (1557). Les Annales d'Aquitaine. Faicts & gestes en sommaire des Roys de France, & d'Angleterre, & pais de Naples & de Milan: reueuës & corrigées par l'Autheur mesmes: iusques en l'an mil cinq cens cinquante & sept (in French). Poitiers: Enguilbert de Marnef.
- du Breuil, Geoffroy (1657). "Chronica Gaufredi coenobitae monasterii D. Martialis Lemovicensis, ac prioris Vosiensis coenobii". In Labbé, Philippe (ed.). Nova Bibliotheca manuscriptorum librorum (in Latin). Vol. II. Paris: Cramoisy. pp. 279–342.(Also known as Geoffroi de Vigeois)
- Born, Bertran de (1986). Paden, William D; Sankovitch, Tilde; Stäblein, Patricia H. (eds.). The Poems of the Troubadour Bertran de Born. Berkeley: University of California Press. ISBN 978-0-520-04297-1.
- Chibnall, Marjorie, ed. (1986). The Historia pontificalis of John of Salisbury. Oxford: Clarendon Press. ISBN 978-0-19-822275-0.
- Canterbury, Gervase of (2012) [1879]. Stubbs, William (ed.). The Historical Works of Gervase of Canterbury (in Latin). Vol. 1. Cambridge University Press. ISBN 978-1-108-05159-0.
- — (2012a) [1880]. The Historical Works of Gervase of Canterbury (in Latin). Vol. 2. Cambridge University Press. ISBN 978-1-108-05160-6.
- Capellanus, Andreas (1990) [1960]. The Art of Courtly Love (in Latin). Translated by John Jay Parry. Columbia University Press. ISBN 978-0-231-07305-9.
- Devizes, Richard of (1838). Stevenson, Joseph (ed.). Chronicon Ricardi Divisiensis de rebus gestis Ricardi Primi, regis Angliae (in Latin). London: Sumptibus Societatis.(Also available here at Internet Archive)
- Grasilier, Th. Abbé, ed. (1871). Cartulaires inédits de la Saintonge (in Latin and French). Vol. 2. Niort: L. Clouzot.
- Hoveden, Roger of (1853). The Annals of Roger de Hoveden: Comprising the History of England and of Other Countries of Europe from A.D. 732 to A.D. 1201. Translated by Henry T Riley. London: H.G. Bohn.
- — (1867). Stubbs, William (ed.). Gesta regis Henrici Secundi Benedicti abbatis: The chronicle of the reigns of Henry II. and Richard I.A.D. 1169–1192; known commonly under the name of Benedict of Peterborough. London: Longmans, Green, Reader, and Dyer.
- Meyer, Paul, ed. (2023) [1882 (1226)]. L'histoire de Guillaume le Maréchal: Comte de Striguil et de Pembroke, régent d'Angleterre (in French). BoD – Books on Demand. ISBN 978-3-385-01225-7.(See also Histoire de Guillaume le Maréchal)
- Migne, Jacques-Paul, ed. (1841–1865). Patrologia Latina, Cursus Completus, Series Latina (in Latin). Paris: Garnier.(see Patrologia Latina)
- Newburgh, William of (1988). Walsh, P J; Kennedy, M J (eds.). The history of English affairs [Historia rerum Anglicarum]. Oxford: Aris. ISBN 978-0-85668-305-3.(Available at Fordham University: Internet Medieval Sourcebook. For MS, see Corpus Christi MS 262, and online by Cambridge University Press, ed. R Howlett)
  - Newburgh, William of (1856). Hamilton, Hans Claude (ed.). Historia rerum anglicarum (in Latin). London: Sumptibus Societatis.
- Salmon, Andre, ed. (2012) [1854]. Recueil de Chroniques de Touraine (in French and Latin). Tours: Hachette Livre. ISBN 978-2-01-276621-1.(Available here at Bibliotheque nationale de France)
- Rymer, Thomas, ed. (1707). FOEDERA, Conventiones, Literae, Et Cujuscunque Generis ACTA PUBLICA, INTER REGES ANGLIAE, Et Alios quosvis IMPERATORES, REGES, PONTIFICES, PRINCIPES, vel COMMUNITATES, AB Ineunte SAECULO DUODECIMO, viz. ab Anno 1101, ad nostra usque Tempora, Habita aut Tractata; Ex Autographis, infra Secretiores ARCHIVORUM REGIORUM Thesaurarias, per multa Saecula reconditis, fideliter Exscripta. In Lucem missa de Mandato REGINAE. Accurante Ejusdem Serenissimae REGINAE Historiographo (in Latin). London: Per A. & J. Churchill.(Also available here at Internet Archive)
- Sainte-More, Benoît de (1912) [1155–1160]. Le roman de Troie: Introduction (in French). Paris: Firmin-Didot et cie.
- Torigny, Robert de (1964) [1889]. Howlett, Richard (ed.). Chronicles of the reigns of Stephen, Henry II and Richard I: The chronicle of Robert of Torigni, abbot of the monastery of St. Michael-in-peril-of-the-sea (in Latin). Longman.(1889 edition)

==== Biography (chronological) ====
- Kelly, Amy (1978) [1950]. Eleanor of Aquitaine and the Four Kings. Cambridge: Harvard University Press. ISBN 978-0-674-24254-8.(Available here at Internet Archive)
- Pernoud, Régine (1967) [1966 Albin Michel]. Eleanor of Aquitaine [Aliénor d'Aquitaine]. Translated by Peter Wiles. London: Collins. (Available here at Internet Archive)
- Meade, Marion (1991) [1977]. Eleanor of Aquitaine: A Biography. New York: Penguin. ISBN 978-0-8015-2231-4.
- Brooks, Polly Schoyer (1983). Queen Eleanor: Independent Spirit of the Medieval World. Boston: Houghton Mifflin. ISBN 978-0-397-31994-7.(For young readers)
- Laube, Daniela (1984). Zehn Kapitel zur Geschichte der Eleonore von Aquitanien (in German). Bern: Peter Lang. ISBN 978-3-261-03476-2.
- Owen, Douglas David Roy (1996) [1993]. Eleanor of Aquitaine: Queen and Legend. Oxford: Blackwell. ISBN 978-0-631-20101-4. (Searchable here at Internet Archive)
- Duby, George (1997) [1995 Gallimard]. "1. E1eanor". Women of the Twelfth Century, Volume 1: Eleanor of Aquitaine and Six Others [Dames du XIIe siècle (Tome 1) – Héloïse, Aliénor, Iseut et quelques autres]. Translated by Jean Birrell. University of Chicago Press. pp. 5–21. ISBN 978-0-226-16780-0. (1. Original French version)
- Weir, Alison (2012) [1999]. Eleanor of Aquitaine: A Life. New York: Random House Publishing Group. ISBN 978-0-307-83185-9. (Searchable here at Internet Archive. Also published under the title Eleanor of Aquitaine: By the wrath of God, Queen of England)
- Parsons, John C.; Wheeler, Bonnie, eds. (2003) [2002]. Eleanor of Aquitaine: Lord and Lady. New York: Palgrave Macmillan. ISBN 978-1-137-05262-9.(Available here at Internet Archive)
- Aurell, Martin, ed. (2004). Aliénor d'Aquitaine. Revue 303; issue 81 (in French).
- Boyd, Douglas (2011) [2004 Sutton Publishing]. April Queen: Eleanor of Aquitaine. Stroud: The History Press. ISBN 978-0-7524-7304-8.(Available here at Internet Archive)
- Flori, Jean (2004). Aliénor d'Aquitaine: la reine insoumise [Eleanor of Aquitaine: Queen and rebel] (in French). Translated by O Classe. Paris: Payot. ISBN 978-2-228-89829-4. (Searchable in Spanish here or in English here on Google Books (Edinburgh University Press 2007)
- Swabey, Ffiona (2004). Eleanor of Aquitaine, Courtly Love, and the Troubadours. Greenwood Guides to historic events of the Medieval World. Westport, CT: Bloomsbury Publishing. ISBN 978-0-313-32523-6. (Searchable here at Internet Archive)
- Turner, Ralph V. (2009). Eleanor of Aquitaine: Queen of France, Queen of England. New Haven, CT: Yale University Press. ISBN 978-0-300-15989-9.
  - Wheeler, Bonnie (April 2013). "Ralph V turner: Eleanor of Aquitaine: Queen of France, Queen of England". Speculum (Review). 88 (2): 595–597. doi:10.1017/S0038713413001085. ISSN 0038-7134. JSTOR 23488919.
- Evans, Michael R. (2014). Inventing Eleanor: The Medieval and Post-Medieval Image of Eleanor of Aquitaine. London: Bloomsbury Publishing. ISBN 978-1-4411-4603-8.(Full text available here, on Ebin)
  - Woodacre, Elena (June 2015). "Inventing Eleanor: the Medieval and Post-Medieval Image of Eleanor of Aquitaine". Reviews in History (Review). doi:10.14296/RiH/2014/1786.
- Evans, Michael (2018). "The missing queen? Eleanor of Aquitaine in the early reign of Louis VII". In Bardot, Michael L; Marvin, Laurence W (eds.). Louis VII and His World. Later Medieval Europe. Vol. 18. Leiden: Brill. pp. 105–113. ISBN 978-90-04-36800-2. Excerpt
- Cockerill, Sara (2019). Eleanor of Aquitaine: Queen of France and England, Mother of Empires. Stroud, Gloucestershire: Amberley Publishing Limited. ISBN 978-1-4456-4618-3.
- Lewis, Matthew (2021). Henry II and Eleanor of Aquitaine: Founding an Empire. Stroud, Gloucestershire: Amberley Publishing Limited. ISBN 978-1-4456-7157-4.
- Weir, Alison (2021). "Eleanor of Aquitaine, Queen of Henry II". Queens of the Crusades: England's Medieval Queens. Vol. 2: 1154–1291. New York: Random House Publishing Group. pp. 1–134. ISBN 978-1-101-96670-9.
- Sullivan, Karen (2023). Eleanor of Aquitaine, as It Was Said: Truth and Tales about the Medieval Queen. University of Chicago Press. ISBN 978-0-226-82584-7.
  - Newman, Barbara (2 November 2023). "She was of the devil's race". London Review of Books (Review). Vol. 45, no. 21. ISSN 0260-9592.

Fiction

- Ball, Margaret (2006). Duchess of Aquitaine: A Novel of Eleanor. New York: St. Martin's Press. ISBN 978-1-4299-0139-0.
- Crawford, F. Marion (2010) [1899]. Via Crucis: A Romance of the Second Crusade. Sacramento: Creative Media Partners, LLC. ISBN 978-1-341-26532-7.(Original edition available here on Google Books)
- Gregory, Kristiana (2002). Eleanor: Crown Jewel of Aquitaine. New York: Scholastic Inc. ISBN 978-0-439-16484-9.
- Groff, Lauren (2021). Matrix. New York: Penguin. ISBN 978-0-698-40513-4.
- Konigsburg, E. L. (1973). A Proud Taste for Scarlet and Miniver. New York: Simon and Schuster. ISBN 978-0-8124-3940-3.
- Lofts, Norah (2010) [1955]. Eleanor the Queen: A Novel of Eleanor of Aquitaine. New York: Simon & Schuster. ISBN 978-1-4391-5562-2.
- Plaidy, Jean (1987). The Courts of Love: The Story of Eleanor of Aquitaine. New York: Crown. ISBN 978-0-307-34707-7.
- Pyle, Howard (2013) [1883]. The Merry Adventures of Robin Hood of Great Renown, in Nottinghamshire. Read Books Ltd. ISBN 978-1-4474-9838-4.(Available here at Internet Archive)
- Shakespeare, William (2008) [1989]. Braunmuller, A. R. (ed.). The life and death of King John. Oxford World's Classic. New York, NY: Oxford University Press. ISBN 978-0-19-953714-3.

==== Chapters ====
- Bouchard, Constance Brittain. "Eleanor's divorce from Louis VII: The uses of consanguinity". In Parsons & Wheeler (2003), pp. 223–236.
- Brown, Elizabeth A R. "Eleanor of Aquitaine reconsidered: The woman and her seasons". In Parsons & Wheeler (2003), pp. 1–54.
- Huneycutt, Lois L. "Alianora Regina Anglorum: Eleanor of Aquitaine and her Anglo-Norman predecessors as queens of England". In Parsons & Wheeler (2003), pp. 115–132.
- Le Goff, Jacques; Armengaud, Jean-Pierre; Aurell, Martin. "Entretien avec Jacques Le Goff". In Aurell (2004), pp. 20–25.
- McCracken, Peggy. "Scandalising desire: Eleanor of Aquitaine and the chroniclers". In Parsons & Wheeler (2003), pp. 247–265.
- Pappano, Margaret Aziza. "Marie de France, Aliénor d'Aquitaine, and the Alien Queen". In Parsons & Wheeler (2003), pp. 337–368.
- Parsons, John; Wheeler, Bonnie. "Prologue". In Parsons & Wheeler (2003), pp. xiii–xxix.

=== Articles and theses ===
- Benton, John F. (October 1961). "The Court of Champagne as a Literary Center". Speculum. 36 (4): 551–591. doi:10.2307/2856785. JSTOR 2856785. S2CID 161184362.
- Bouchard, Constance B. (1981). "Consanguinity and Noble Marriages in the Tenth and Eleventh Centuries". Speculum. 56 (2): 268–287. doi:10.2307/2846935. ISSN 0038-7134. JSTOR 2846935. PMID 11610836. S2CID 38717048.
- Broadhurst, Karen M. (January 1996). "Henry II of England and Eleanor of Aquitaine: Patrons of Literature in French?". Viator. 27: 53–84. doi:10.1484/J.VIATOR.2.301122. ISSN 0083-5897.
- Carney, Elizabeth (1984). "Fact and Fiction in 'Queen Eleanor's Confession'". Folklore. 95 (2): 167–170. doi:10.1080/0015587X.1984.9716310. ISSN 0015-587X. JSTOR 1260200.
- Chambers, Frank McMinn (1941). "Some Legends Concerning Eleanor of Aquitaine". Speculum: A Journal of Medieval Studies. 16 (4). University of Chicago Press: 459–468. doi:10.2307/2852844. JSTOR 2852844. S2CID 162522341.
- Clogan, Paul M. (1990). "New Directions in Twelfth-Century Courtly Narrative: Le Roman de Thèbes". Mediaevistik. 3: 55–70. ISSN 0934-7453. JSTOR 42583811.
- Crawford, Katherine (2012). "Revisiting Monarchy: Women and the Prospects for Power". Journal of Women's History. 24 (1): 160–171. doi:10.1353/jowh.2012.0006. S2CID 144074176.
- Dobson, Dina Portway (1912). "Eleanor of Aquitaine". History. 1 (4): 201–212. ISSN 0018-2648. JSTOR 44990112.
- Harris-Stoertz, Fiona (2012). "Pregnancy and Childbirth in Twelfth-and Thirteenth-Century French and English Law". Journal of the History of Sexuality. 21 (2): 263–281. doi:10.1353/sex.2012.0040. ISSN 1043-4070. JSTOR 41475080. PMID 22606750. S2CID 27146977.
- Kelly, Amy (January 1937). "Eleanor of Aquitaine and Her Courts of Love". Speculum: A Journal of Medieval Studies. 12 (1). University of Chicago Press: 3–19. doi:10.2307/2848658. JSTOR 2848658. S2CID 162194965.
- Kleinmann, Dorothée; Garcia, Michel; Cloulas, Ivan; Kenaan-Kedar, Nurith (1999). "Les peintures murales de Sainte-Radegonde de Chinon. À propos d'un article récent". Cahiers de Civilisation Médiévale. 42 (168): 397–399. doi:10.3406/ccmed.1999.2766.
- Marvin, Laurence W. (2019). "King Louis Vii of France Fails to Lead: Disaster on the Second Crusade". Medieval Warfare. 9 (2): 38–43. ISSN 2211-5129. JSTOR 48637203.
- McCash, June Hall Martin (October 1979). "Marie de Champagne and Eleanor of Aquitaine: A Relationship Reexamined". Speculum. 54 (4): 698–711. doi:10.2307/2850324. JSTOR 2850324.
- Norman, F. (April 1963). "Eleanor of Poitou in the twelfth-century German lyric". German Life and Letters. 16 (3–4): 248–255. doi:10.1111/j.1468-0483.1963.tb00724.x. ISSN 0016-8777.
- Richardson, H. G. (1959). "The Letters and Charters of Eleanor of Aquitaine". The English Historical Review. 74 (291): 193–213. doi:10.1093/ehr/LXXIV.291.193. ISSN 0013-8266. JSTOR 558439.
- Stapleton, Rachel F. (November 2012). "Motherly Devotion and Fatherly Obligation: Eleanor of Aquitaine's Letters to Pope Celestine III". Medieval Feminist Forum. 48 (1): 97–121. doi:10.17077/1536-8742.1913. ISSN 1536-8742.
- — (January 2008). "Eleanor of Aquitaine, Twelfth-Century English Chroniclers and her 'Black Legend'". Nottingham Medieval Studies. 52: 17–42. doi:10.1484/J.NMS.3.427. ISSN 0078-2122. S2CID 162514613.
- Wilkinson, Bertie (1944). "The government of England during the absence of Richard I on the Third Crusade" (PDF). Bulletin of the John Rylands Library, Manchester. 28 (2): 485–509. doi:10.7227/BJRL.28.2.12.

Theses

- Akeroyd, Marissa Naschae (December 2017). Eleanor of Aquitaine: By the Grace of God Queen of England (Master thesis). Department of History, Southeastern Louisiana University, Hammond.
- Barreiros, Megane (2016). Eleanor of Aquitaine: A Queen and A Mother (PDF) (Master thesis). Université Toulouse.
- Ramsey, Shawn D. (August 2012). Deliberative Rhetoric in the Twelfth Century: The Case for Eleanor of Aquitaine, Noblewomen, and the Ars Dictaminis (PhD thesis). Bowling Green State University, Ohio.

==== Encyclopaedias ====
- "Monarchs of England (924x7–1707)". Oxford Dictionary of National Biography (online ed.). Oxford University Press. 2004. doi:10.1093/ref:odnb/92701. (Subscription, Wikipedia Library access or UK public library membership required.)

=== Websites ===
- "Sex & The Citadel: Eleanor of Aquitaine and the Courtly Love Myth". All About History. 13 July 2017.
- Eleanor of Aquitaine (1193). "A letter from Eleanor of Aquitaine (1193)". Columbia University Center for Teaching and Learning. Epistolae: Medieval Women's Latin Letters.
- "The Accolade by Edmund Leighton". Baker Street Gallery. 2024.
- "Eleanor Rising". BBC Radio 4. 2024.
- "Eleanor of Aquitaine". BBC History. 2014.
- Betts, Gavin (2018). "10: Were diu werlt alle min (Carmina Burana)". Teach Yourself Complete Latin: Level 4. Teach Yourself.
- Brooke, Michael (2014a). "King John On Screen". BFI Screenonline Television. Archived from the original on 2 August 2016.
- Brooke, Michael (2014b). "Life and Death of King John". BFI Screenonline Television. Archived from the original on 2 August 2016.
- "Place Settings". Brooklyn Museum. 2024.
- Chadwick, Elizabeth (24 March 2013). "Eleanor of Aquitaine and the Brother Who Never Was". The History Girls.
- — (5 June 2013a). "The Summer Queen: Behind the scenes 3. On Eleanor of Aquitaine's appearance". Living the History.
- — (24 August 2016). "Eleanor of Aquitaine: Going the Distance". The History Girls.
- — (2021). "Eleanor of Aquitaine Trilogy".
- — (2021a). "Finding Petronella". Living the History.
- "Eleanor of Aquitaine". French Philately. 2004.
- "Queen Eleanors Bower". Historic England. 2012.
- "The Lion in Winter". Golden Globe Awards. 1968.
- McDermott, Kristen (February 2021). "Death and the Maiden (Mistress of the Art of Death)". Historical Novel Society 95 (Review).
- "Vase d'Aliénor". Louvre. 2023.
- "Chapel from Notre-Dame-du-Bourg at Langon". The Metropolitan Museum of Art. 2024.
- "Queen Eleanor 1858". National Museum Cardiff. 2023.
- "Restauration de l'oeuvre picturale Aliénor d'Aquitaine accordant les franchises communales aux habitants de Niort en 1203". Niortagglo. 14 November 2022.
- "Eleanor of Aquitaine". National Portrait Gallery, London.
- "The 41st Academy Awards". Oscars. 1969.
- Franklin, Ariana (2022). "The Assassin's Prayer; or, A murderous procession by Ariana Franklin". Penrith City Library.
- Franklin, Ariana (3 February 2009). The Serpent's Tale. Penguin Random House.
- Penman, Sharon Kay (2011). "The Eleanor of Aquitaine Tour 2011: In the footsteps of Eleanor of Aquitaine".
- "The Lion in Winter. Ambassador Theatre". Playbill. 1966.
- "The Lion in Winter". TV Guide. 2024.
- "Fair Rosamund and Queen Eleanor". Yale Centre for British Art. 2024.

Eleanor of Aquitaine House of Poitiers Born: 1124 Died: 1 April 1204
French nobility
Preceded by William X/VIII	Duchess of the Aquitainians; 9 April 1137 – 1 April 1204 with Louis VII of France (1137–1152); Henry II of England (1152–1189); Richard I of England (1189–1199); John of England (1199–1204)	Succeeded by John
Preceded by William X/VIII	Countess of Poitiers; 9 April 1137 – 1 April 1204 with Louis VII of France (1137–1152); Henry II of England (1152–1189); Richard I of England (1189–1199); John of England (1199–1204)	Succeeded by John
Royal titles
Preceded by Adelaide of Maurienne	Queen consort of the Franks; 12 July 1137 – March 1152; Served alongside: Adelaide of Maurienne (25 July – 1 August 1137)	Vacant Title next held by Constance of Castile
Vacant Title last held by Matilda I of Boulogne	Queen consort of the English; 25 October 1154 – 6 July 1189; Served alongside: Margaret of France (1172–1183)	Vacant Title next held by Berengaria of Navarre
