= Vermandois =

Former French county in Picardy

Coordinates: 49°51′N 3°17′E

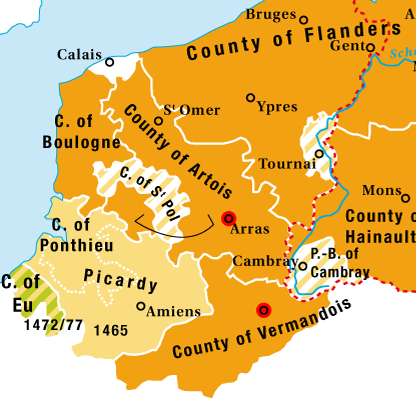
Vermandois in the possession of the House of Valois-Burgundy, from 1435 to 1477 (southernmost county on map)

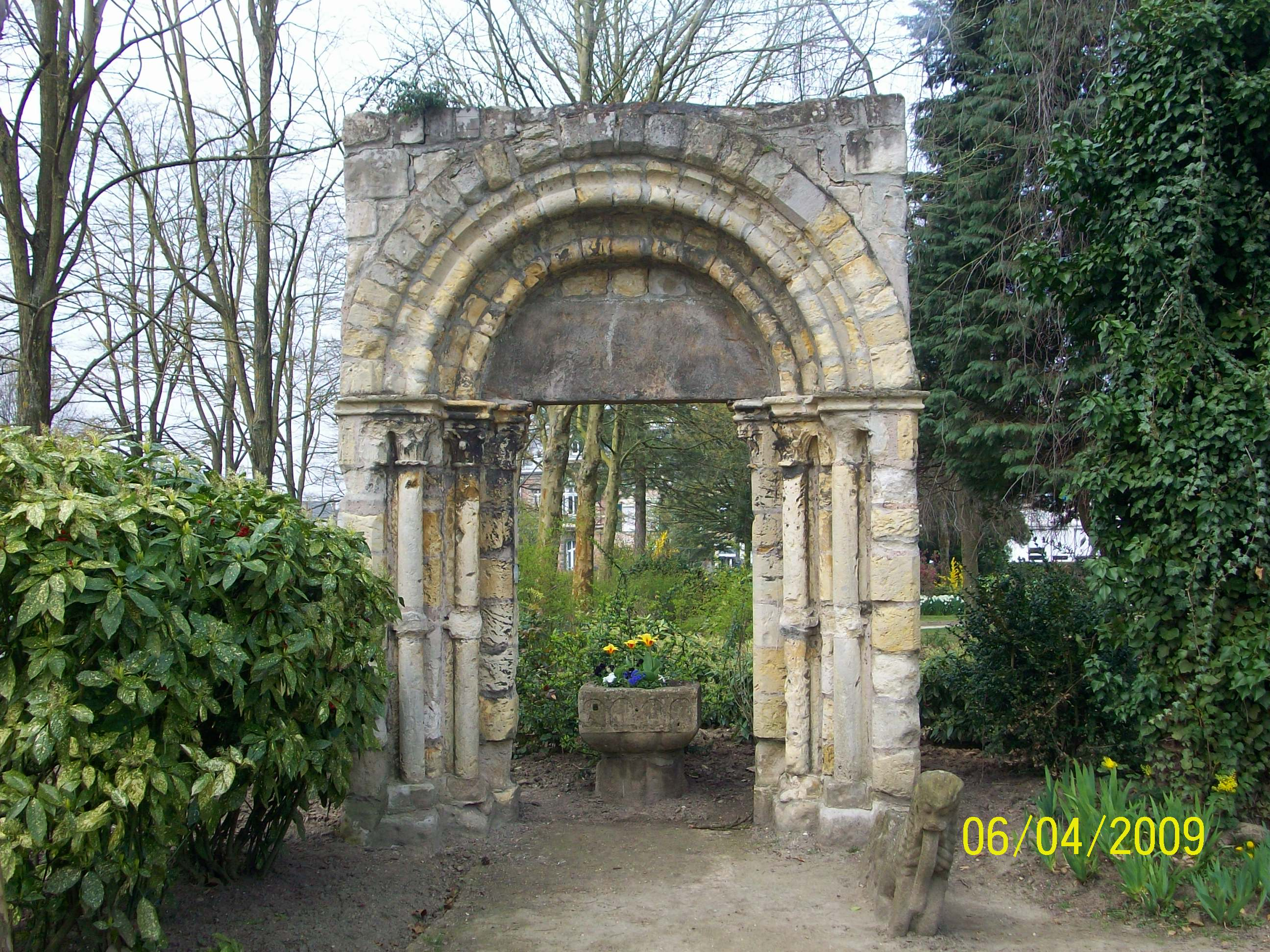
Porte St-Jean

Vermandois (French pronunciation: [vɛʁmɑ̃dwa]) was a French county that appeared in the Merovingian period. Its name derives from that of an ancient tribe, the Viromandui. In the 10th century, it was organised around two castellan domains: St Quentin (Aisne) and Péronne (Somme). In today's times, the Vermandois county would fall in the Picardy region of northern France.

Pepin I of Vermandois, the earliest of its hereditary counts, was descended in direct male line from the emperor Charlemagne. More famous was his grandson Herbert II (902–943), who considerably increased the territorial power of the house of Vermandois, and kept the lawful king of France, the unlucky Charles the Simple, prisoner for six years. Herbert II was son of Herbert I, lord of Péronne and St Quentin, who was killed in 902 by an assassin in the pay of Baldwin II, Count of Flanders. His successors, Albert I, Herbert III, Albert II, Otto and Herbert IV, were not as historically significant.

In 1077, the last count of the first house of Vermandois, Herbert IV, received the county of Valois through his wife. His son Eudes (II) the insane was disinherited by the council of the Barons of France. He was lord of Saint-Simon through his wife, and the county was given to his sister Adela, whose first husband was Hugh the Great, the brother of King Philip I of France. Hugh was one of the leaders of the First Crusade, and died in 1102 at Tarsus in Cilicia. The eldest son of Hugh and Adela was count Raoul I (c. 1120–1152), who married Petronilla of Aquitaine, sister of the queen, Eleanor, and had by her three children: Raoul (Rudolph) II, the Leper (count from 1152 to 1167); Isabelle, who possessed from 1167 to 1183 the counties of Vermandois, Valois and Amiens conjointly with her husband, Philip, Count of Flanders; and Eleanor. By the terms of a treaty concluded in 1186 with the king, Philip Augustus, the count of Flanders kept the county of Vermandois until his death, in 1191. At this date, a new arrangement gave Eleanor (d. 1213) a life interest in the eastern part of Vermandois, together with the title of countess of St Quentin, and the king entered immediately into possession of Péronne and its dependencies.

By the Treaty of Arras (1435), the county of Vermandois was confirmed in possession of the House of Valois-Burgundy, and remained so until 1477, when the War of the Burgundian Succession broke out, and the county was repossessed by the French crown.

== See also ==
- List of counts of Vermandois
- Bohain-en-Vermandois
- Vaux-en-Vermandois

== Sources ==
- Fouquier-Cholet, M. "Histoire des Comtes héréditaires du Vermandois", Saint-Quentin, 1832.
- Potter, David L. (1995). A History of France, 1460–1560: The Emergence of a Nation. Basingstoke: Macmillan. ISBN 978-0-333-54123-4.
- Saenger, Paul (1977). "Burgundy and the Inalienability of Appanages in the Reign of Louis XI". French Historical Studies. 10 (1): 1–26. doi:10.2307/286114. JSTOR 286114.
- Stein, Robert (2017). Magnanimous Dukes and Rising States: The Unification of the Burgundian Netherlands, 1380–1480. Oxford: Oxford University Press. ISBN 978-0-19-875710-8.
