= Pepin of Vermandois =

Pepin of Vermandois may refer to:

- Pepin I, Count of Vermandois
- Pepin II, Count of Vermandois
