= Aimery I, Viscount of Châtellerault =

Viscount of Châtellerault

- Coat of Arms of Châtellerault
- Born: c. 1075
- Died: 7 November 1151; Notre-Dame de Noyers monastery, in Nouâtre
- Noble family: Châtellerault
- Spouse: Dangereuse de l'Isle Bouchard
- Issue: Hugh de Châtellerault; Raoul de Faye; Aénor de Châtellerault
- Father: Boson II de Châtellerault
- Mother: Aleanor de Thouars

Aimery I de Châtellerault (c. 1075 – 7 November 1151), was the Viscount of Châtellerault and father of Aenor de Châtellerault. Through his daughter he was the grandfather of Eleanor of Aquitaine, successively queen of France and England.

== Family ==
Aimery was born to Boson II de Châtellerault and his wife, Aleanor de Thouars. His paternal grandparents were Hugues I de Châtellerault and his wife, Gerberge. His maternal grandparents were Aimery IV, Viscount of Thouars and his first wife Aremgarde.

== Life ==
=== Marriage ===
Aimery was married to Amauberge, called Dangereuse, the daughter of Bartholomew de l'Isle Bouchard and his wife Gerberge de Blaison. Their marriage produced at least three children:

- Hugh, succeeded his father as Viscount of Châtellerault; he was married to Ella d’Alençon daughter of John I, Count of Alençon, and Beatrix of Maine
- Raoul, who became the lord of Fay-la-Vineuse through his marriage to Elisabeth de Faye;
- Aenor (c. 1103 – March 1130), who married William X, Duke of Aquitaine. She was the mother of Duchess Eleanor, Petronilla, and William Aigret, who died at the age of four. Eleanor became Duchess of Aquitaine in her own right, as well as twice being a queen, through successive marriages to Louis VII of France and Henry II of England. Eleanor of Aquitaine was known to have been quite fond of her maternal uncles, Hugh and Raoul, and granted them during her two tenures as queen of France and then of England.

=== The affair ===
In 1115, after seven years of marriage, Amauberge was "abducted" from her bedchamber by William IX, Duke of Aquitaine. She was taken to a tower in his castle in Poitiers called Maubergeonne. As a result, Amauberge or Dangereuse was nicknamed La Maubergeonne. Abductions like these were quite common among nobles during the Middle Ages. However, in this particular case she seems to have been a willing contributor to the affair.

The Duke of Aquitaine, the earliest known troubadour whose work survives, was quite popular with the women of his time and was known to have had many affairs. However, the Viscountess would become his mistress for the rest of his life. There is no record of complaint by Aimery. This is believed to be because the Viscount feared the wrath of his powerful and volatile overlord. It would be the Duke's wife, Philippa of Toulouse who took action against the "abduction" and affair. Her actions would lead to both William and Dangereuse being excommunicated by the Pope. William used his wealth and power to eventually reconcile with the Pope and was accepted back into the Church.

In 1121 Aimery and Dangereuse's daughter, Aenor, married William IX's son and heir, who would become Duke William X of Aquitaine. It is believed that this union came about at Dangereuse's urging, as historians don't see another reason for the union of such a powerful man to the daughter of a minor vassal. In support of this argument for a domestic rather than a political motive, Aenor was the daughter of the woman the future duke hated for her role in the treatment of his mother. Regardless of the cause, the marriage led to the birth of Eleanor of Aquitaine and made Aimery an ancestor of some of Europe's most famous nobles and rulers.

== Bibliography ==
- Painter, Sidney (1955). "The Houses of Lusignan and Chatellerault 1150-1250". Speculum. 30 (3): 374–384. doi:10.2307/2848076. JSTOR 2848076. S2CID 162997835.
- Markale, Jean. Eleanor of Aquitaine: queen of the troubadours. Rochester, Vt.: Inner Traditions, 2007. Print.
- Paden, William D.; Bardin, Mireille; Hall, Michèle; Kelly, Patricia; Gregg Ney, F.; Pavlovich, Simone; South, Alice (1975). "The Troubadour's Lady: Her Marital Status and Social Rank". Studies in Philology. 72 (1): 28–50. JSTOR 4173861.
- Swabey, Ffiona. Eleanor of Aquitaine, courtly love, and the troubadours . Westport, Conn.: Greenwood Press, 2004. Print.
- Weir, Alison. Eleanor of Aquitaine: a life. New York: Ballantine Books, 2000. Print.
