= Aénor de Châtellerault =

Duchess of Aquitaine from 1126 to 1130

Duchess consort of Aquitaine
- Tenure: 10 February 1126 – March 1130
- Born: c. 1103; Châtellerault, Aquitaine
- Died: March 1130; Talmont
- Burial: Abbey of Saint-Vincent in Nieul-sur-l'Autise.
- Spouse: William X, Duke of Aquitaine
- Issue: Eleanor, Queen of England and France; Petronilla, Countess of Vermandois; William Aigret
- House: Châtellerault
- Father: Aimery I, Viscount of Châtellerault
- Mother: Dangereuse of L'Île-Bouchard

Aénor of Châtellerault (also known as Aénor de Rochefoucauld; c. 1103 – March 1130) was Duchess of Aquitaine as the wife of Duke William X and the mother of the powerful queen and heiress Eleanor of Aquitaine.

== Biography ==
Aénor was a daughter of Aimery I, Viscount of Châtellerault, and his wife, Dangereuse of L'Île-Bouchard. Most likely named after her paternal grandmother, Aénor was the first-born daughter of the couple but the third-born child. She had two older brothers, Hugh and Raoul, and two younger sisters, Amable and Aois.

Her mother was willingly abducted by her future father-in-law, William IX of Aquitaine and became his mistress until his death in 1127. From her mother's second relationship, Aénor had three half-siblings: Henri, Adelaide and Sybille.

In 1121, Aénor married William X of Aquitaine, the son of her mother's lover. The marriage, arranged before her mother's elopement, might at the time have been seen as a mésalliance, as Aénor came from a much lesser noble house, with her father being only a very minor vassal of the House of Poitiers, and her mother's scandalous reputation.

Not much is known about Aénor and William's relationship, but considering that they had three children fairly close together and that William in a charter referred to Aénor as his "dear wife", it seems that they at least were on fairly good terms. Aénor is also attested to have prompted her husband to give out donations and grants to religious institutions.

They had three children:

- Eleanor of Aquitaine, Duchess of Aquitaine, and wife of both Louis VII of France and Henry II of England
- Petronilla of Aquitaine, wife of Raoul I, Count of Vermandois
- William Aigret (who died at the age of four with his mother at Talmont-sur-Gironde)

Aénor died suddenly in 1130 while hunting with her husband in the marshes of Lower Poitiou, possibly of a fever. She was buried nearby in the Saint-Vincent monastery at Nieul-sur-l'Autise.

== Sources ==
- Painter, Sidney (1955). "The Houses of Lusignan and Chatellerault 1150-1250". Speculum. 30 (3 July): 374–384. doi:10.2307/2848076. JSTOR 2848076.
