= Pepin II =

Pepin II or Pippin II may refer to:

- Pepin of Herstal (died 714), Frankish mayor of the palace
- Pepin II of Aquitaine (born 823), Carolingian monarch
- Pepin II, Count of Vermandois (845–893)

== See also ==
- Pepin I (disambiguation)
