= Odo I of Furneaux =

Frankish noble and Count of Furneaux from the Herbertien dynasty

Odo l of Furneaux (Eudes de Furneaux) (c. 1040-1086) was a Frankish noble from Herbertien dynasty a branch of Carolingian dynasty. He was Count of Furneaux, son of Otto, Count of Vermandois and his wife Pavia (or Patia). He was married to Bertha, whose family and relatives remain unknown.
