= Crown lands of France =

Former subdivisions of France under monarchy

The crown lands, crown estate, royal domain or (in French) domaine royal (from demesne) of France were the lands, fiefs and rights directly possessed by the kings of France. While the term eventually came to refer to a territorial unit, the royal domain originally referred to the network of "castles, villages and estates, forests, towns, religious houses and bishoprics, and the rights of justice, tolls and taxes" effectively held by the king or under his domination. In terms of territory, before the reign of Henry IV, the domaine royal did not encompass the entirety of the territory of the kingdom of France and for much of the Middle Ages significant portions of the kingdom were the direct possessions of other feudal lords.

In the tenth and eleventh centuries, the first Capetians—while being the kings of France—were among the least powerful of the great feudal lords of France in terms of territory possessed. Patiently, through the use of feudal law (and, in particular, the confiscation of fiefs from rebellious vassals), conquest, annexation, skillful marriages with heiresses of large fiefs, and even by purchase, the kings of France were able to increase the royal domain. By the time of Philip IV, the meaning of "royal domain" began to shift from a mere collection of lands and rights to a fixed territorial unit, and by the sixteenth century the "royal domain" began to coincide with the entire kingdom. However, the medieval system of appanage (a concession of a fief with its land rights by the sovereign to his younger sons, which reverts to the crown upon the extinction of the male line of the original holder) alienated large territories from the royal domain and sometimes created dangerous rivals (especially the Burgundian State from the 14th to the 15th centuries).

During the Wars of Religion, the alienation of lands and fiefs from the royal domain was frequently criticized. The Edict of Moulins (1566) declared that the royal domain (defined in the second article as all the land controlled by the crown for more than ten years) could not be alienated, except in two cases: by interlocking, in the case of financial emergency, with a perpetual option to repurchase the land; and to form an appanage, which must return to the crown in its original state on the extinction of the male line.

Traditionally, the king was expected to survive from the revenues generated from the royal domain, but fiscal necessity, especially in times of war, led the kings to enact "exceptional" taxes, like the taille, upon the whole of the kingdom (the taille became permanent in 1439).

== Chronology of the formation of the royal domain ==
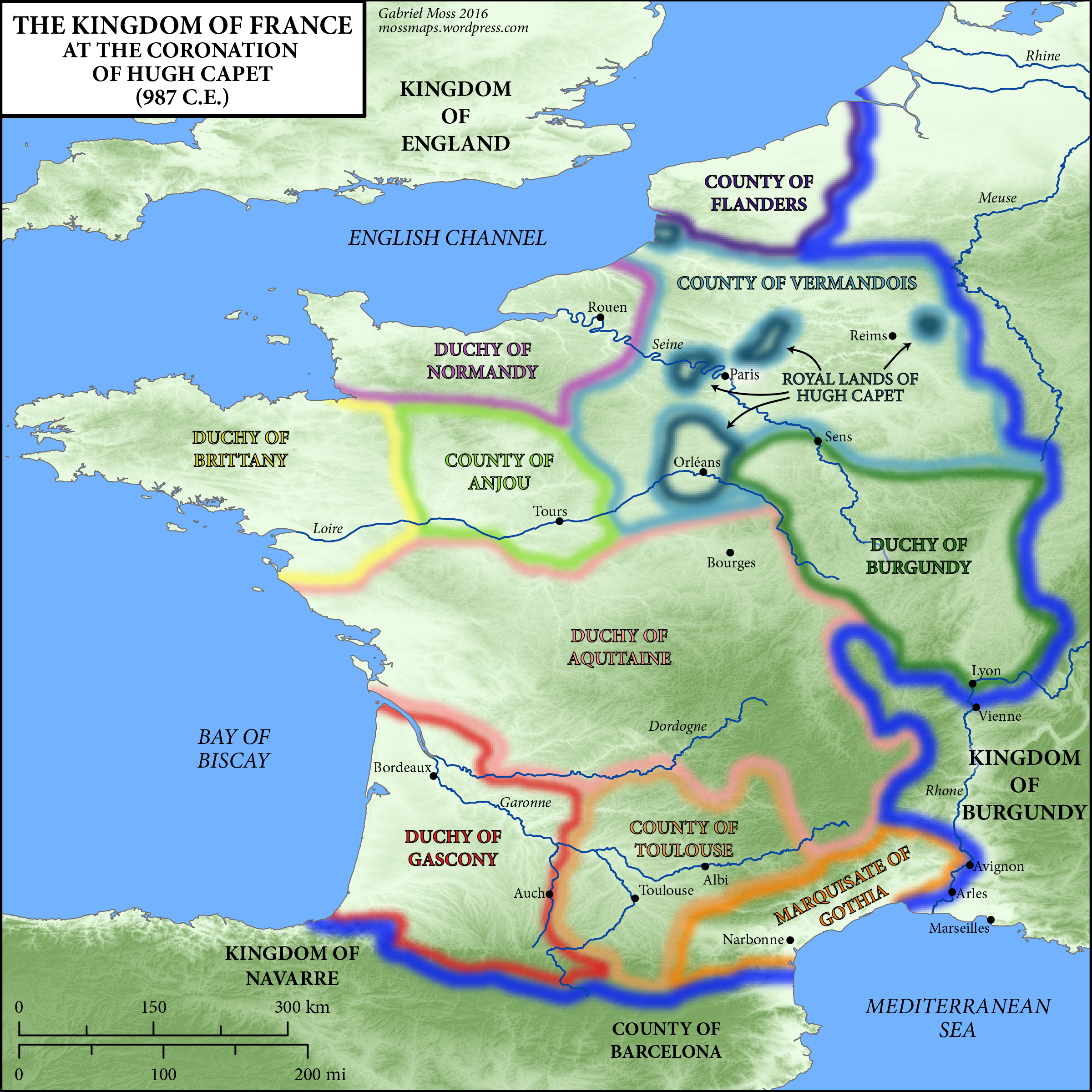
The Kingdom of France at the time of Hugh Capet. French royal domain in blue.

=== House of Capet ===
==== Reign of Hugh Capet ====
At the beginning of Hugh Capet's reign, the crown estate was extremely small and consisted mostly of scattered possessions in the Île-de-France and Orléanais regions (Senlis, Poissy, Orléans), with several other isolated pockets, such as Attigny. These lands were largely the inheritance of the Robertians, the direct ancestors of the Capetians.

- 988: Montreuil-sur-Mer, the first port held by the Capetians, is acquired through the marriage of the crown prince Robert (future Robert II the Pious) with Rozala, the widow of the Arnulf II, Count of Flanders.

==== Reign of Robert II ====
- 1016: acquisition of the Duchy of Burgundy. The king was the nephew of Duke Henry of Burgundy, who died without heirs.
- Robert gains the counties of Paris, Dreux and Melun, and negotiates the ultimate acquisition (1055) of a part of Sens.

==== Reign of Henry I ====
The Kingdom of France in 1030. French royal domain in blue.

- 1034: the king gives the Duchy of Burgundy to his brother Robert (the duchy would remain with his descendants until 1361; see House of Burgundy)
- 1055: annexation of the County of Sens.

==== Reign of Philip I ====
- 1068: acquisition of Gâtinais and Château-Landon from Fulk IV, Count of Anjou
- 1077: annexation of the French Vexin
- 1081: acquisition of Moret-sur-Loing
- 1101: acquisition of the Viscounty of Bourges and the seigneury of Dun-sur-Auron from Odo Arpin of Bourges

==== Reign of Louis VI ====
- the king spends much of his reign pacifying and consolidating the royal domain by battling certain feudal lords (lords of Montlhéry, of Coucy, of Puiset, of Crécy...)
- from Fulk, Viscount of Gâtinais, Louis bought Moret, Le Châtelet-en-Brie, Boësses, Yèvre-le-Châtel and Chambon.
- Other additions to the royal domain include: Montlhéry and Châteaufort, Chevreuse, Corbeil, Meung-sur-Loire, Châteaurenard and Saint-Brisson.

==== Reign of Louis VII ====
The Kingdom of France in 1154. French royal domain in dark blue.

- 1137: marriage of Louis with Eleanor of Aquitaine, Duchess of Aquitaine and Gascony and Countess of Poitou. By this marriage, Louis hopes to attach most of South-West France to the royal domain.
- 1137: Louis gives Dreux to his brother Robert.
- 1151: separation of Louis VII and of Eleanor of Aquitaine, who in 1152 weds Henry Plantagenet, Count of Anjou, Count of Maine and Duke of Normandy, who becomes in 1154, King of England. Eleanor's lands come to Henry in her dowry.
- 1160: gives Norman Vexin to his daughter Margaret as a dowry. Margaret is later forced to surrender her dowry.

==== Reign of Philip II Augustus ====
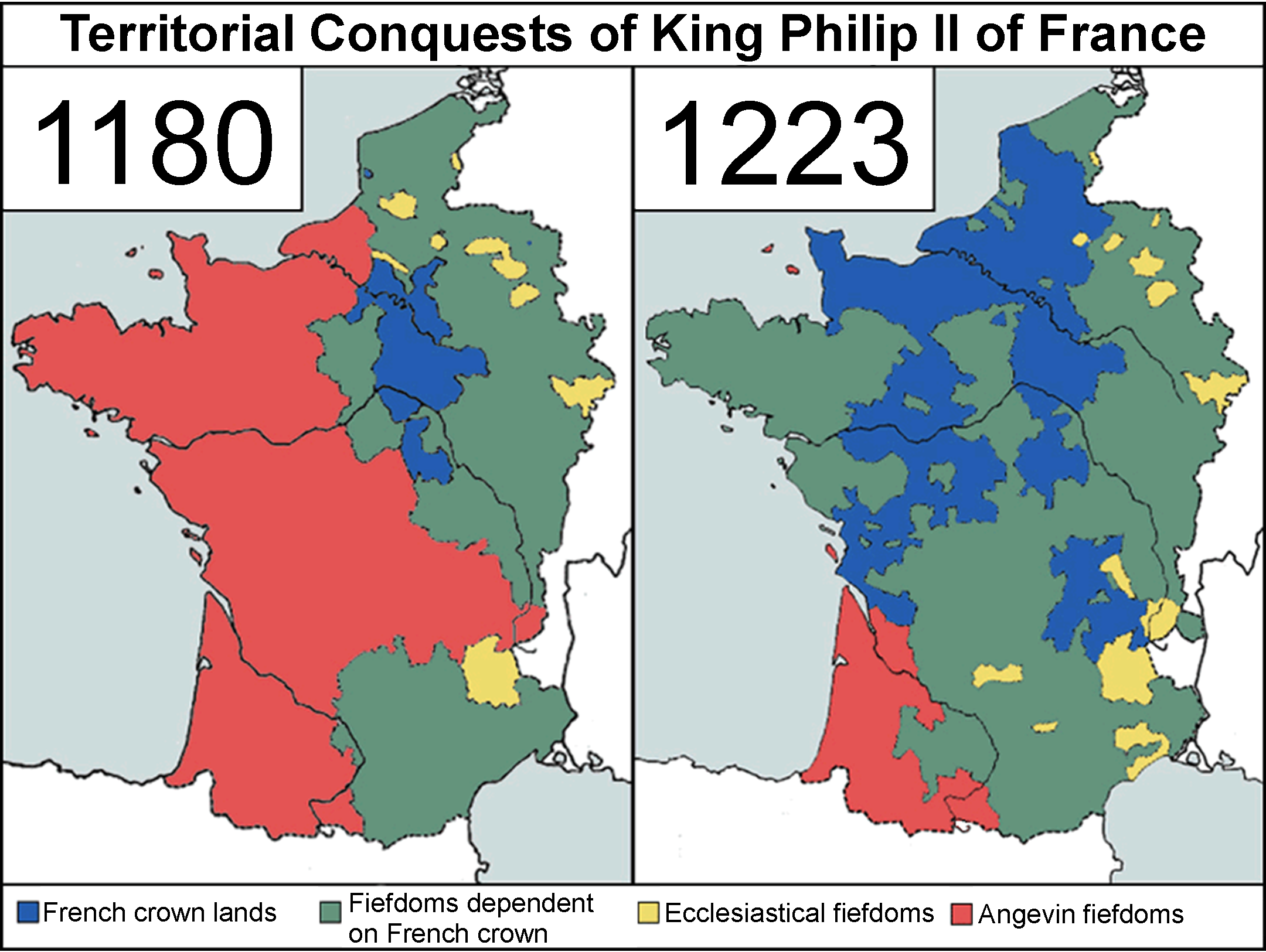
The territorial conquests of Philip Augustus of France, at the time of his coronation (1180) and at the time of his death (1223).

- 1184: granted Montargis.
- 1185: by the Treaty of Boves, gains Amiens and Montdidier, Roye, Choisy-au-Bac, and Thourotte and rights to the inheritance of Vermandois and Valois.
- 1187: seizes Tournai from the bishop.
- confiscates Meulan, Gisors, and other castles.
- 1191: at the death of Philip of Alsace, Count of Flanders, the County of Artois and its dependencies, the inheritance of the queen Isabelle of Hainaut, are given to prince Louis. These areas would not become integrated into the royal domain until 1223 when Louis becomes king.
- 1191: the County of Vermandois is acquired by the king, after the death of Elisabeth of Vermandois, the inheritor of the County. Confirmed in 1213, by Eléonore of Vermandois sister of Elisabeth. Philip also gains Valois.
- 1200: the Norman Vexin is annexed
- 1200 the County of Évreux and Issoudun are annexed, in exchange for the king's recognition of John of England as king of England.
- 1204: confiscation of the Duchy of Normandy, the Touraine, Anjou, Saintonge and, temporarily, of the Poitou from John of England.
- 1208: La Ferté-Macé confiscated from Guillaume IV of Ferté-Macé
- 1220: the County of Alençon is reunited to the royal domain in the absence of a male heir to Count Robert IV (the county is sold by the vicomtesse of Châtellerault).

==== Reign of Louis VIII ====
- 1223: Philip Hurepel, half-brother of the king, received in appanage the Counties of Boulogne (Boulogne-sur-Mer), and of Clermont (Clermont-en-Beauvaisis), as well as the fiefs of Domfront, Mortain and Aumale.
- Poitou, Saintonge, Angoumois, Périgord and a part of the Bordelais were confiscated from the king of England.
- following the Albigensian Crusade (1209–1229) against the Cathars and the Count of Toulouse, the king annexed the County of Toulouse the heiress of which, Joan of Toulouse, married Alphonse, Count of Poitou, son of the king, in 1237.
- 1225: in his will, Louis grants the appanages of Artois and his mother's inheritance to his second son Robert; Poitou and Auvergne to his third son Alphonse; and Anjou and Maine to his fourth son John (due to John's death, these possessions would go to Louis' seventh son Charles).

==== Reign of Louis IX ====
- 1229: Raymond VII, Count of Toulouse cedes to the king the sénéchaussées of Nîmes–Beaucaire and of Béziers–Carcassonne (Treaty of Paris (1229))
- 1237: the king confirms the appanage grant of the County of Artois for his brother Robert I of Artois.
- 1241: the king confirms the appanage grant of Poitou for his brother Alphonse, Count of Poitou.
- 1249: Alphonse, Count of Poitou, by right of his wife succeeds Raymond VII of Toulouse.
- 1255: the County of Beaumont-le-Roger is bought back from Raoul of Meulan.
- 1258: the king renounces the Roussillon and Catalonia; in exchange the king of Aragon renounces Provence and Languedoc (Treaty of Corbeil (1258))
- 1259: seigneuries of Domfront and of Tinchebray acquired.
- 1259: the king gives to the king of England Henry III the Duchy of Aquitaine, and promises him Saintonge, Charente and Agenais in the case of the death without heir of the Count of Toulouse Alfonso of Poitiers (Treaty of Paris (1259))
- 1268 the king gives the County of Alençon and Perche to his son Peter.
- the king grants as appanage the County of Valois to his son John Tristan and Clermont-en-Beauvaisis to his son Robert.

==== Reign of Philip III ====
- 1271: reversion of the County of Toulouse, Poitou and Auvergne, the Comtat Venaissin, appanages of Alfonso, Count of Poitou, to the royal domain
- 1274: purchase of the County of Nemours
- 1274: the king cedes half of the Comtat Venaissin to pope Gregory X
- 1283: Perche and the County of Alençon are inherited from the king's brother Pierre I of Alençon.
- 1284: purchase of the County of Chartres.
- the king makes appanage grants of Valois to his second son Charles and Beaumont-en-Oise to his third son Louis.

==== Reigns of Philip IV, the Fair and his sons ====
- 1284: marriage of Philip the Fair, the future king of France, with Queen Joan I of Navarre, Countess of Champagne. The County of Champagne is reunited to the royal domain (made official in 1361)
- 1285–1295: purchase of the County of Guînes from Count Arnould III who needed money to pay a ransom.
- 1286: purchase of the County of Chartres from Jeanne of Blois-Châtillon, widow of her uncle Pierre
- 1292: Ostrevant
- 1295: the king gives up a part of the County of Guines.
- as they reverted to the crown, Philip IV makes appanage grants of Alençon, Chartres and Perche to his brother Charles and Évreux to his brother Louis. By his marriage, Charles also acquires Maine and Anjou. To his sons, Philip gives the appanages of Poitiers to Philip, and La Marche and Angoulême to Charles.
- 1308: purchase of the County of Angoulême, of Fougères and of Lusignan from Yolande of Lusignan
- 1313: Confiscation of Tournai – which is however a land belonging to the Empire – from Marie de Mortagne.
- 1322: the County of Bigorre is incorporated into the royal domain at the crowning of the king Charles IV, who held it from his mother Joan I of Navarre

=== House of Valois ===
==== Reign of Philip VI of Valois ====
- the appanages of the new king (Valois, Anjou, Maine, Chartres and Alençon) are reunited to the royal domain.
- 1336: conquest of the County of Ponthieu, given to the king of England in 1360.
- 1343–1349: the Dauphiné is sold to the kingdom of France by the Dauphin of Viennois
- 1349: purchase for the kingdom of France of the seigneurie of Montpellier from James III of Majorca, the dispossessed king of Majorca, for 120 000 écus.

==== Reign of John II ====
- 1350–1360: after the death of Raoul II of Brienne, Count of Guînes, and connétable of France (decapitated for treason), the County of Guînes is confiscated. It will be ceded to the English by the Treaty of Brétigny.
- 1360: by the Treaty of Brétigny, Aquitaine (1/3 of the kingdom) is given to the king of England, to obtain the release of the French king, prisoner since the Battle of Poitiers (1356).
- 1360: John, Duke of Berry receives the Duchy of Berry as appanage. He is also made Count of Poitiers (1357–1416), Count of Mâcon (c. 1360–1372), Count of Angoulême and Saintonge (bef. 1372–1374) and Count of Étampes (1399–1416). At his death, these lands return to the royal domain. He is also given the Duchy of Auvergne.
- 1361: the king gives Touraine in appanage to his son Philip.
- 1361: the king successfully claims the Duchy of Burgundy as the heir by proximity of blood.

==== Reign of Charles V ====
- Thanks to Du Guesclin, the king recovers the Duchy of Aquitaine.
- 27 May 1364: the city of Montivilliers is detached from the County of Longueville and attached to the royal domain.
- 1364: Philip the Bold receives in appanage the Duchy of Burgundy
- 1371: purchase of the County of Auxerre
- 1377: Dreux returns to the royal domain

==== Reign of Charles VI ====
The royal domain and the appanages early in the reign of Charles VI.

- 1392: the appanage of Orléans is given to Louis I de Valois, Duke of Orléans, brother of the king. He also becomes Count of Valois (1386?), Duke of Touraine (1386), Count of Blois (1397; the county is sold by Guy II, Count of Blois at the death of his only son), Angoulême (1404), Périgord, Dreux and Soissons.
- 1416: the appanage of the Duchy of Berry comes back to the royal domain after the death of Jean, Duke of Berry, the uncle of the king.
- 1416: the king recreates the appanage of Berry for his son Jean who dies in 1417.
- 1417: the king gives the appanage of Berry to his son Charles VII of France.

==== Reign of Charles VII ====
- 1424: Duchy of Touraine granted to Archibald Douglas, 4th Earl of Douglas, killed later that year at Verneuil.
- 1434: Amboise is confiscated from Louis of Amboise (who had plotted against Georges de la Trémoille, a favorite of the king) and reunited with the crown.
- 1453: at the death of Mathieu of Foix, the County of Comminges is incorporated into the royal domain

==== Reign of Louis XI ====
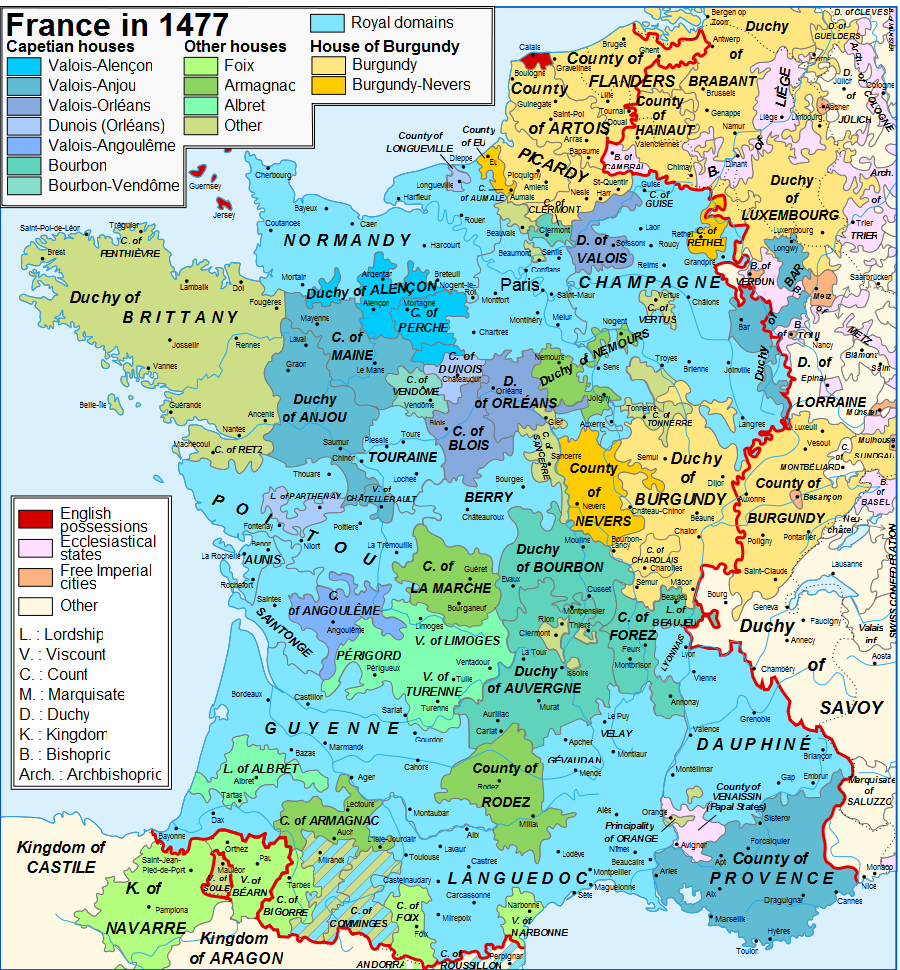
Map of France in 1477

- 1461–1472: the king gives the Duchy of Berry in appanage to his brother Charles of France. Dissatisfied, Charles joins with other feudal nobles in the League of the Public Weal. At the Treaty of Conflans in 1465, Charles of France exchanges Berry for the Duchy of Normandy (1465–1469). In 1469, Charles is forced to exchange Normandy for the Duchy of Guyenne (1486–1472).
- 1462: the king alienates the County of Comminges from the royal domain, giving it to Jean de Lescun.
- 1477: the County of Ponthieu is definitively reattached to the royal domain.
- 1478: the County of Boulogne is acquired by exchange.
- 1481: Charles IV, Duke of Anjou, Count of Maine, Guise, Mortain and Gien, who succeeded his uncle René I of Anjou as Duke of Anjou and Count of Provence and Forcalquier, dies, bequeathing his lands to his cousin Louis XI.
- 1482: by the Treaty of Arras, the Duchy of Burgundy and Picardy are reattached to the domain.
- 1482: acquisition of the viscounty of Châtellerault.

==== Reign of Charles VIII ====
- 1483: the seigneuries of Châtel-sur-Moselle and Bainville are taken from the Duchy of Bar.
- 1491: the marriage of the king to Duchess Anne of Brittany begins the personal union of the Duchy of Brittany and the kingdom.

==== Reign of Louis XII ====
- 1498: the crowning of the new king brings his appanages Valois (alienated in 1386?) and Orléans (alienated in 1392) back to the royal domain, and the county of Blois is integrated into the royal domain for the first time.
- 1498: the second marriage of the king with the Duchess Anne of Brittany continues the personal union of Brittany to the kingdom which had been interrupted when Anne, as widow, asserted the independence of Brittany.
- 1498: at the death of Odet of Aydie, the County of Comminges (alienated in 1462) returns to the crown.
- 1499: the king gives the Duchy of Berry to his former wife Joan of France.
- 1504–1512: the Duchy of Nemours reverts to the royal domain. In 1507, it is given to Gaston of Foix, but reverts at his death in 1512.

==== Reign of Francis I ====
- 1515: Nemours is given to Giuliano di Lorenzo de' Medici. The duchy passes in 1524 to Francis' mother, Louise of Savoy and will remain with the house of Savoy until 1659.
- 1531: possessions of the disgraced Charles III, Duke of Bourbon are confiscated: Bourbonnais, Auvergne, Counties of Montpensier, of Clermont, of Mercœur and Forez

From the reign of Francis I, the concept of "royal domain" begins to coincide with the French kingdom in general; the appanage of the House of Bourbon however remains alienated.

- 1532: union of the Duchy of Brittany to France, the inheritance of Claude of France daughter of Anne of Brittany. The Dauphin becomes the Duke of Brittany but dies before he ascends to the throne of France.

==== Reign of Henry II ====
- 1547: for the first time the title Duke of Brittany and King of France is held by the same male primogeniture descendant. This marks the final step in the personal union of Brittany with France.
- 1548: Duchy of Châtellerault conferred upon James Hamilton, 2nd Earl of Arran.
- 1558: French reconquest and incorporation of Calais into the Crown lands under the leadership of Henry II, which ended 150 years of English rule.

=== House of Bourbon ===
==== Reign of Henry IV ====
- 1589: Henry III of Navarre becomes Henry IV of France, succeeding his cousin Henry III after his assassination. On accession to the thrones of Navarre and France, Henry ruled over a vast territory including appanages suzerain to the king of France, such as the County of Soissons, the duchies of Alençon, Vendôme, Beaumont, the Viscounty of Limoges, the County of Périgord, the County of Rodez, the Duchy of Albret, the viscounties of Lomagne, Marsan, Gabardan, and Tursan, as well as the counties of Fézensac, Quatre-Vallées, Gaure, Armagnac, Foix, and Bigorre.
- 1589: The Kingdom of Navarre (Basse-Navarre and the Principality of Béarn) remains independent but in personal union with France.

==== Reign of Louis XIII ====
- 1620: The king leads an army over Béarn and issues an edict at Pau, incorporating the Kingdom of Navarre and Béarn to the crown of France. From then on, while some prerogatives and the name were kept, the Kingdom of Navarre (Basse Navarre) with Béarn was no longer sovereign.

== See also ==
- Appanage
- Feudal system
- Feudal fragmentation
- Territorial formation of France
- Crown Estate – for similar holdings in the UK
