= Eleanor of Vermandois =

French countess

Eleanor
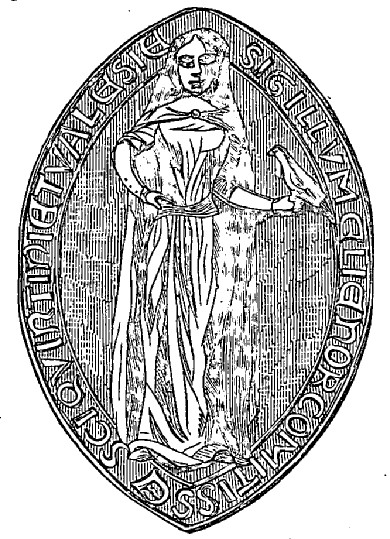

Countess of Vermandois and Valois
- Reign: 1182–1213
- Predecessor: Elisabeth
- Born: 1148/1149
- Died: 19 June or 21 June 1213
- Spouse: Godfrey of Hainaut; William IV, Count of Nevers; Matthew, Count of Boulogne; Matthew III, Count of Beaumont; Hugues III, sire d'Auxy
- House: Capet
- Father: Ralph I, Count of Vermandois
- Mother: Petronilla of Aquitaine

Eleanor (French: Éléonore or Aliéonor or Aénor, 1148 or 1149 – 19 or 21 June 1213) was reigning countess of Vermandois and Valois from 1182 to 1213 and by marriage countess of Ostervant, Nevers, Auxerre, Boulogne and Beaumont.

== Early life ==
Eleanor was the daughter of Ralph I of Vermandois and his second wife, Petronilla of Aquitaine. Eleanor was the youngest of three children from his second marriage. Eleanor's two siblings were Ralph II and Elisabeth. A couple of years after the birth of Eleanor, her parents divorced; her father remarried to Laurette of Flanders in 1152 but died later that same year.

== Marriages ==
Eleanor was married firstly in her mid-teens to Godfrey, count of Ostervant, heir to his father, Count Baldwin IV of Hainaut. The couple married in 1162, however, Godfrey died the following year, whilst preparing for a journey to the territory of Palestine.

Her second marriage in 1164 was to Count William IV of Nevers; this marriage was also brief lasting only four years when William died at Acre in 1168 on crusade.

A third marriage occurred in 1171 between Eleanor and Count Matthew of Boulogne, (Note: Berman doubts the veracity of Eleanor and Matthew marrying) who had divorced his first wife, Countess Marie of Boulogne, the previous year. This marriage produced one child, a short lived daughter. No further children could be born as Matthew died in 1173 whilst fighting at the siege of Trenton (now Neufchatel-en-Bray); he was shot by an archer wielding a crossbow.

A fourth marriage took place in 1175 to Count Matthew III of Beaumont. They were married for seventeen years – Eleanor's longest marriage – but they had no children and in 1192, Matthew and Eleanor divorced. (Note: Shortell indicates there are no clear records for the end of the marriage. While Constance Hoffman Berman argues that Eleanor and Matthew were married but Eleanor was sole ruler over the County of Vermandois.)

Finally, according to de La Chesnaye Des Bois, she married Huguh III, lord of Auxy, which would have been some time after her divorce from her previous marriage in 1192, and had issue. This would seem to contradict her arrangement with King Philip II of France, whereby the County of Vermandois would go to any surviving children born to her instead of the king as it did upon her death (unless the children were removed from any such inheritance before her death).

== Countess of Vermandois ==
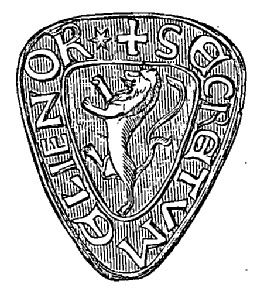

Eleanor's brother Ralph II died of leprosy in 1167, leaving no children and Eleanor's sister Elisabeth died in 1183. Her marriage to Philip I, Count of Flanders, had produced no children; therefore, Eleanor could then rightfully inherit the County of Vermandois.

Upon the death of Elisabeth, her widower Count Philip refused to pass over control of Vermandois to Eleanor; she then appealed to Philip II of France for support. Under the Treaty of La-Grange-Saint-Arnoul on 20 March 1182, Eleanor retained Valois, calling herself at that point Countess of Valois. Following Philip II of France's victory over the Flemish at Boves, she gained part of Vermandois and titled herself Countess of Vermandois. With the death of Philip in 1192, she inherited the rest of Vermandois on the condition that Philip II would annex Vermandois into the royal domain if Eleanor died without children.

From that point onward, Eleanor reigned alone over Vermandois and Valois. Eleanor was remembered as a witty yet pious woman. In 1205, she founded the Cistercian Abbey of Parc-aux-Dames in Auger-Saint-Vincent, she loved poetry and gave the minister Renaud impetus to the Constitution of the Roman de Sainte-Geneviève. She also donated property to Notre-Dame by charter dated 1189.

Eleanor died in 1213/1214 at the age of sixty after a 21-year rule over Vermandois, (Note: Berman states Eleanor died in 1213/1214.) and she was buried in the Cistercian Abbey of Longpont (today she is buried in Aisne). Upon Eleanor's death, King Philip took over control of all of Eleanor's property.

== Sources ==
- Berman, Constance Hoffman (2010). "Two Medieval Women's Property and Religious Benefactions in France: Eleanor of Vermandois and Blanche of Castile". Viator. 41 (2). University of California Press.
- Gilbert de Mons (2005). Chronicle of Hainaut. Translated by Napran, Laura. Boydell Press.
- Shortell, Ellen M. (2012). "Erasures and Recoveries of Women's Contributions to Gothic Architecture: The Case of Saint-Quentin, Local Nobility, and Eleanor of Vermandois". In Martin, Therese (ed.). Reassessing the Roles of Women as 'makers' of Medieval Art and Architecture. Vol. 1. Brill. pp. 129–174.

| Preceded by Elisabeth | Countess of Vermandois; 1182–1213 | Vacant Merged into the crown Title next held by Louis |
| Preceded by Elisabeth | Countess of Valois; 1182–1213 | Vacant Merged into the crown Title next held by John Tristan |
