= Dangereuse of L'Île-Bouchard =

11/12th-century French noblewoman

- Viscountess of Châtellerault
- Born: 1079
- Died: 1151 (aged 71–72)
- Noble family: L'Île-Bouchard
- Spouse: Aimery I, Viscount of Châtellerault
- Issue: With Aimery; Aenor de Châtellerault; Hugh, Viscount of Châtellerault; Raoul de Faye; Amable, Countess of Angoulême; Aois; With William; Henri, Prior of Clunys; Adélaïde de Poitiers; Sybille, Abbess of Saintes
- Father: Bartholomew, Lord of L'Île-Bouchard
- Mother: Gerberge of Blaison

Dangereuse of L'Île-Bouchard (Poitevin: Dangerosa; 1079 – 1151) was the daughter of Bartholomew, Lord of L'Île-Bouchard and his wife Gerberge of Blaison. She was the maternal grandmother of Eleanor of Aquitaine. She was also mistress to her granddaughters' paternal grandfather, William IX, Duke of Aquitaine. As the mistress of William the Troubadour, she was known as La Maubergeonne for the tower he built for her at his castle in Poitiers.

Dangereuse ("Dangerous") was a sobriquet she received for her seductiveness; her baptismal name may have been Amauberge or Amal(a)berge.

== Life ==
=== Marriage ===
Dangereuse married Aimery I, Viscount of Châtellerault, at an unknown date. She advised her husband to donate property to the priory of Saint-Denis-de-Vaux in a charter dated 1109, which means they were married before this point. Dangereuse was a woman who did as she pleased and cared little for the opinion of her peers.

Their marriage produced five children (two sons and three daughters):

- Hugh (died before 1176) succeeded his father as Viscount
- Raoul de Faye (died 1190) married Elisabeth, dame de Faye-la-Vineuse and had issue; he became grand seneschal of Aquitaine.
- Aénor de Châtellerault (c. 1103 – March 1130) married William X, Duke of Aquitaine, mother to Eleanor of Aquitaine, Petronilla of Aquitaine, and William Aubrey (d. March 1130, age 4)
- Amable, married Wulgrin II of Angoulême
- Aois, married Pierre-Élie de Chauvigny and was the mother of André de Chauvigny.

Dangereuse and Aimery were married for around seven years before she left her husband to become mistress to Duke William IX; this became an infamous liaison.

=== Mistress to William IX ===
Whilst travelling through Poitou, Duke William IX of Aquitaine met the "seductive" Dangereuse. This led to her leaving her husband for Duke William, who was excommunicated by the church for "abducting her"; however, she appeared to have been a willing party in the matter. He installed her in the Maubergeonne tower of his castle in Poitiers, and, as related by William of Malmesbury, even painted a picture of her on his shield.

Upon returning to Poitiers from Toulouse, William's wife Philippa of Toulouse was enraged to discover a rival woman living in her palace. She appealed to her friends at the court of Aquitaine and to the Church; however, no noble could assist her since William was their feudal overlord, and when the Papal legate Giraud complained to William and told him to return Dangereuse to her husband, William's only response to the bald legate was, "Curls will grow on your pate before I part with the Viscountess." Humiliated, in 1116, Philippa chose to retire to the Abbey of Fontevrault.

Dangereuse and William had three children:

- Henri (died after 1132), a monk and later Prior of Cluny.
- Adelaide (born c. 1102). There is a theory that her mother was Philippa of Toulouse, in which case she was Raoul de Faye’s (seigneur de Faye-la-Vineuse) second wife, (Dangereuse and Aimery I's second son).
- Sybille, Abbess of Saintes.

Some believe that Raymond of Poitiers was a child of William by Dangereuse, rather than by Philippa of Toulouse. A primary source that names his mother has not so far been identified. However, he is not named in other sources as a legitimate son of Willam IX. It is therefore reasonable to suppose that he was born from the duke's relationship with Dangereuse. If this is the case, Dangereuse was grandmother to Bohemund III of Antioch, Maria of Antioch and Philippa of Antioch.

Philippa died two years later and William's first wife Ermengarde set out to avenge Philippa. In October 1119, she suddenly appeared at the Council of Reims being held by Pope Calixtus II and demanded that the Pope excommunicate William (again), oust Dangereuse from the ducal palace, and restore herself to her rightful place as duchess. The Pope "declined to accommodate her"; however, she continued to trouble William for several years afterwards.

The relationship between William IX and his legitimate son William X was troubled by the father's liaison with Dangereuse. This was only settled when the pair arranged the marriage between William X and Dangereuse's daughter Aenor in 1121; the following year, Eleanor was born.

William IX died on 10 February 1127; nothing is recorded of Dangereuse after this point. She died in 1151.

== Sources ==
- Harvey, Ruth E. The wives of the 'first troubadour', Duke William IX of Aquitaine (Journal of Medieval History), 1993
- Parsons, John Carmi. Eleanor of Aquitaine: Lord and Lady, 2002
