= Pepin I =

Pepin I or Pippin I may refer to:

- Pepin of Landen (died 640), Frankish mayor of the palace
- Pepin I of Aquitaine (died 838), Carolingian monarch
- Pepin I, Count of Vermandois (died 850)

== See also ==
- Pepin II
