= Herbert I =

Herbert I may refer to:

- Herbert I, Count of Vermandois (c. 848/850 – 907)
- Herbert I, Count of Maine (died in 1036)
