= Elizabeth de Vermandois =

Elizabeth de Vermandois may refer to:

- Elizabeth of Vermandois, Countess of Leicester (1081–1131), daughter of Hugh of Vermandois; granddaughter of Henry I of France; wife of Robert de Beaumont, 1st Earl of Leicester
- Elisabeth, Countess of Vermandois (1143–1183), daughter of Raoul I of Vermandois and wife of Philip, Count of Flanders
