= Cretin =

Cretin may refer to:

- Cretin (medicine), an archaic term for a patient with congenital iodine deficiency syndrome (cretinism)
- a pejorative term, similar to idiot
- Crétin (surname), a French-language surname

== Education ==
Named after Joseph Crétin

- Cretin Hall, a residence hall at the University of St. Thomas in Saint Paul, Minnesota
- Cretin-Derham Hall High School, a co-educational Catholic high school in Minnesota

== Other ==
- Cape Cretin, a headland in the Huon Gulf in Papua New Guinea
- "Cretin", a song by Revocation from the album Chaos of Forms, 2011

== See also ==
- Parliamentary cretinism
