= Bernard II =

Bernard II may refer to:

- Bernard II of Toulouse (died 877)
- Bernard II of Auvergne or Bernard Plantapilosa (died 885)
- Bernard II, Count of Laon (c. 845–<893)
- Bernard II, Duke of Saxony (died 1059)
- Bernard II Tumapaler of Gascony (1020 – after 1064)
- Bernard II of Besalú (died 1100)
- Bernard II de Balliol (died 1190)
- Bernard II, Lord of Lippe (c. 1140–1224)
- Bernhard II, Prince of Anhalt-Bernburg (c. 1260 – after 1323)
- Bernard II, Duke of Saxe-Lauenburg (c. 1385 — 1463)
- Bernard II, Duke of Brunswick-Lüneburg (c. 1437–1464)
- Bernardo II of Kongo (ruled 1614–1615)
- Bernhard II, Duke of Saxe-Jena (1638–1678)
- Bernhard II, Duke of Saxe-Meiningen (1800–1882)
- Bernard II of Werle (c. 1320–1382)
