= Louis de Bourbon =

Louis de Bourbon may refer to:

- Louis I, Duke of Bourbon (1279 – 1342), Count of Clermont-en-Beauvaisis and La Marche, and the first Duke of Bourbon
- Louis II, Duke of Bourbon, called the Good (1337 – 1410), third Duke of Bourbon
- Louis de Bourbon, Prince-Bishop of Liège (1438 – 1482), son of Charles I, Duke of Bourbon, and Agnes of Burgundy
- Louis de Bourbon, comte de Roussillon (1466 – 1486), Admiral of France
- Louis de Bourbon de Vendôme (1493-1557), son of Francis de Bourbon, Count of Vendome and Marie of Luxembourg
- Louis, Count of Soissons (1604 – 1641), son of Charles de Bourbon, Comte de Soissons and Anne de Montafié
- Louis, Grand Condé (1621 – 1686), a French general and the most famous representative of the Condé branch of the House of Bourbon
- Louis, Count of Vermandois (1667 – 1683), eldest surviving son of Louis XIV of France and his mistress, Louise de la Vallière
- Louis Henri, Duke of Bourbon (1692 – 1740)
- Louis Henry II, Prince of Condé (1756 – 1830)
- Louis Alphonse, Duke of Anjou (b. 1974)
