= Louis, Count of Vermandois =

French count; legitimized son of Louis XIV (1667–1683)

Louis
- Count of Vermandois
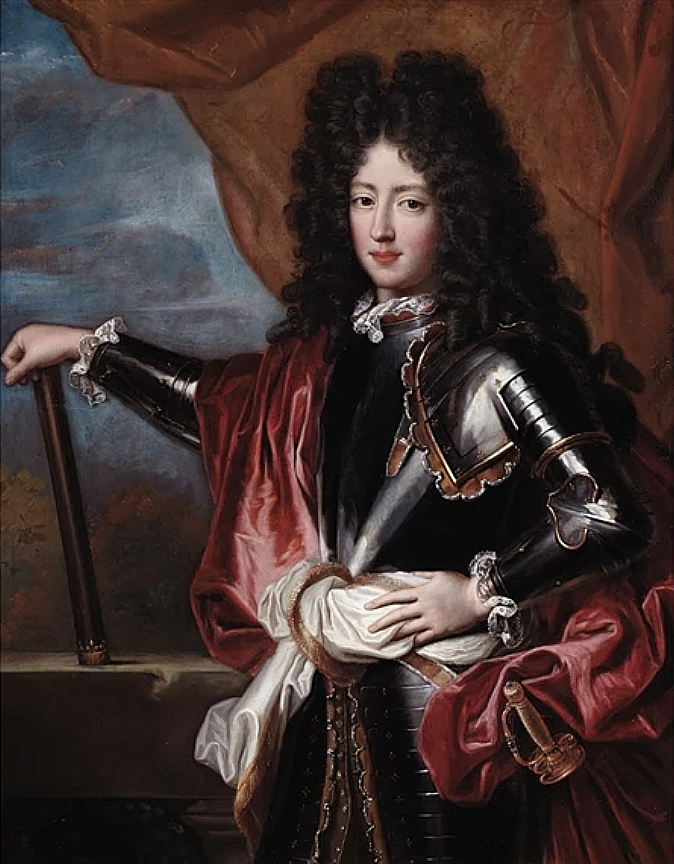
- Portrait attributed to François de Troy
- Born: Louis de La Blaume Le Blanc; 2 October 1667; Saint-Germain-en-Laye, Kingdom of France
- Died: 18 November 1683 (aged 16); Flanders
- Burial: Arras Cathedral
- House: Bourbon
- Father: Louis XIV
- Mother: Louise de La Vallière

Louis de Bourbon, Légitimé de France, Count of Vermandois, born Louis de La Blaume Le Blanc, also known as Louis de/of Vermandois (2 October 1667 – 18 November 1683) was a French nobleman, illegitimate but legitimised son of Louis XIV, King of France by his mistress, Louise de La Vallière. He died exiled and disgraced at the age of 16, unmarried and without issue.

== Early life ==
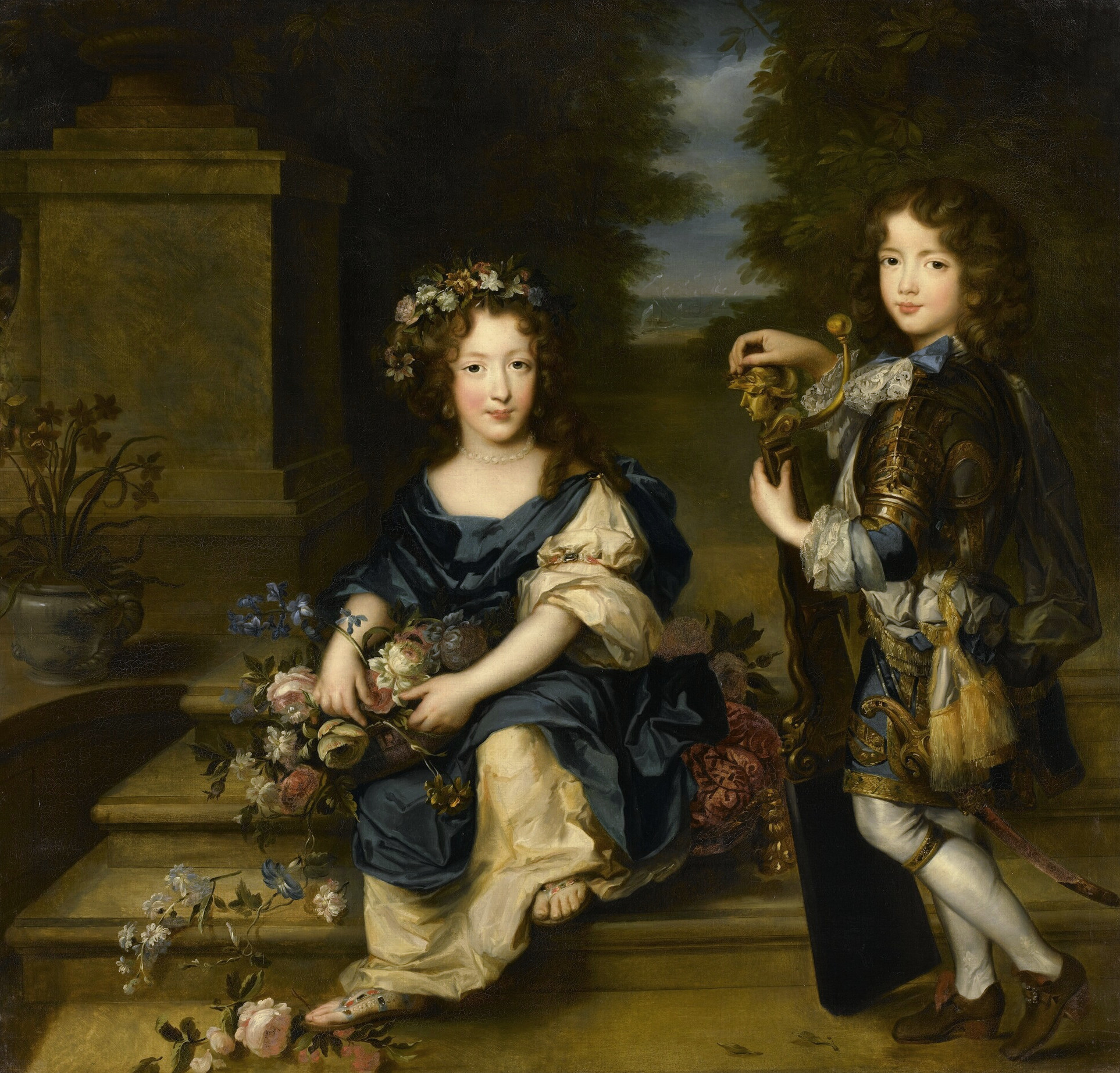
The Count of Vermandois and his sister Mademoiselle de Blois on Louis-Édouard Rioult's 1839 copy of a 17th century painting.

Louis de La Blaume Le Blanc was born on 2 October 1667 at the Castle of Saint-Germain-en-Laye on 2 October 1667 to Louise de La Blaume Le Blanc de La Vallière, Mademoiselle de La Vallière (1644–1710). His father was his unmarried mother's long-time lover, Louis XIV, King of France (1638–1715). His parents had been in an extramarital affair for about 6 years by then, but their relationship was nearing its end. They had had 4 children together, only one of whom, the already legitimised Marie-Anne de Bourbon, Mademoiselle de Blois (1666–1739) was still alive when La Blaume Le Blanc was born. He was named after his father.

At the age of 2, in 1669, La Blaume Le Blanc was legitimised, given the surname de Bourbon (of Bourbon), as opposed to the surname de France (of France) borne by his legitimate half-siblings. He was also created Count of Vermandois (comte de Vermandois) and appointed Admiral of France (Amiral de France).

The parents of the Count of Vermandois

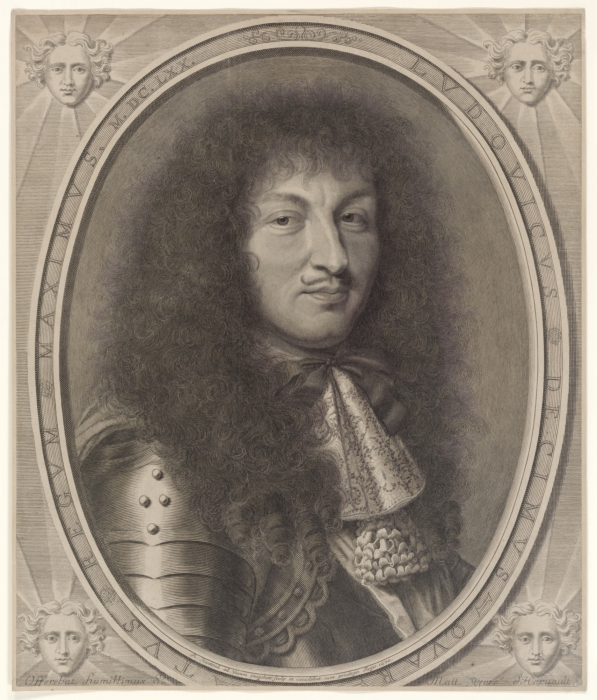
His father, Louis XIV on a 1670 engraving by Robert Nanteuil

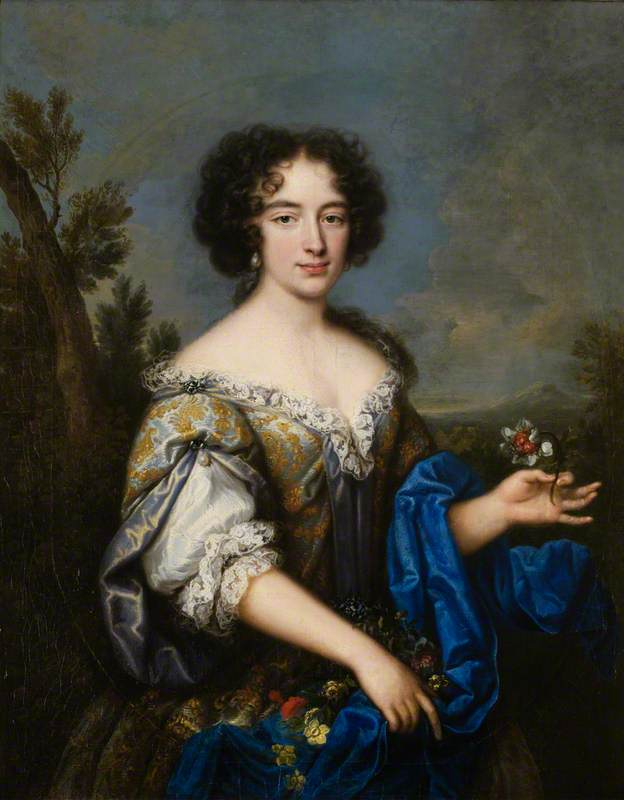
His mother, Louise de La Vallière, in a contemporary painting attributed to Pierre Mignard I

=== Life with the Orléans family ===
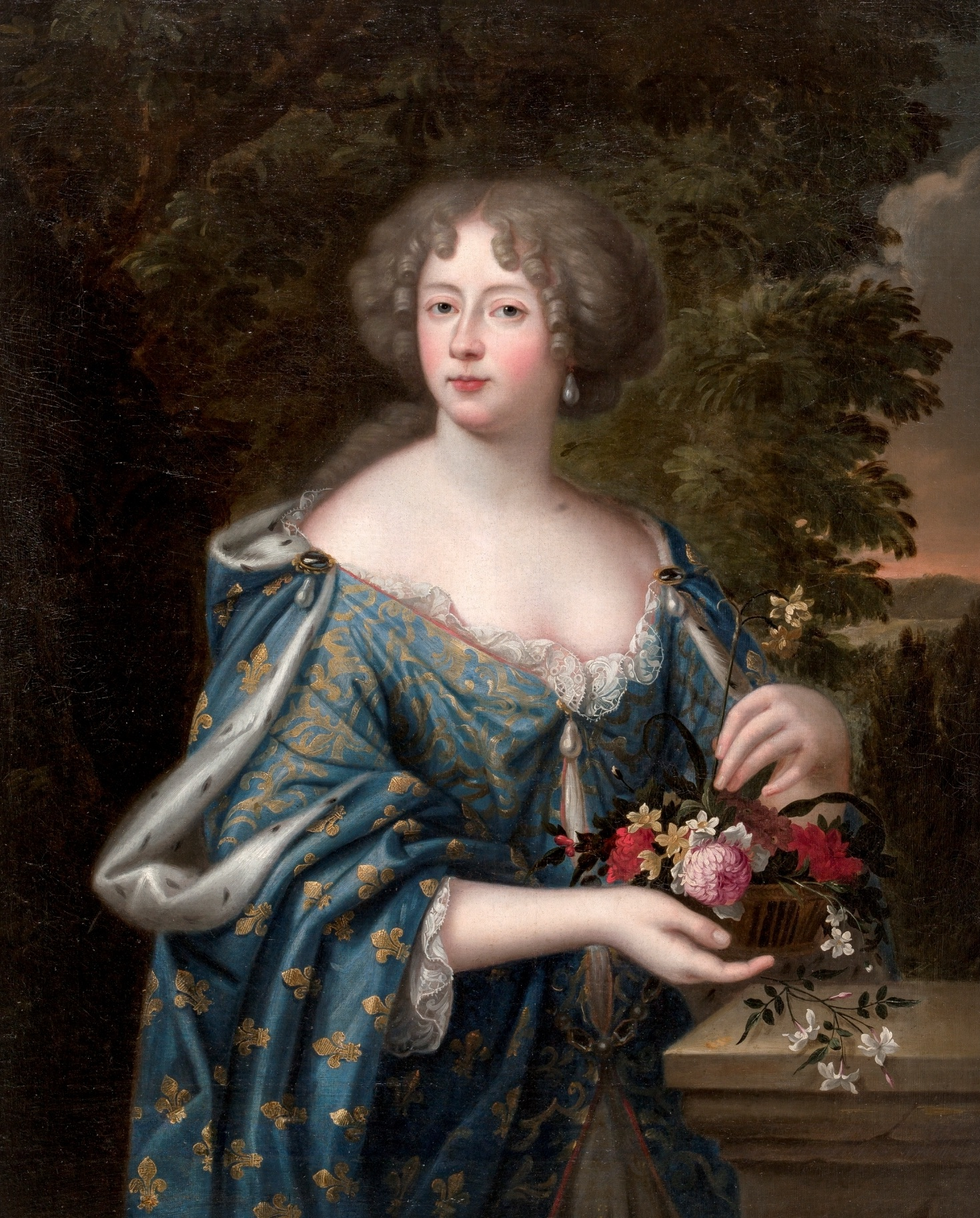
The Duchess of Orléans on a 1675 portrait by Pierre Mignard I

In 1674, when Vermandois was 7 years old, his mother entered a Carmelite convent in Paris, and from then on, he saw very little of her. He was entrusted to the care of his aunt (the wife of his paternal uncle, Philippe I, Duke of Orléans [1640–1701]), born Princess Elizabeth Charlotte "Liselotte" of the Palatinate (1652–1722), known at court as Madame or Madame Palatine. He lived with the Orléans family in the Palais-Royal in Paris, and became close with his aunt, despite her well-known disdain for the king's "bastards".

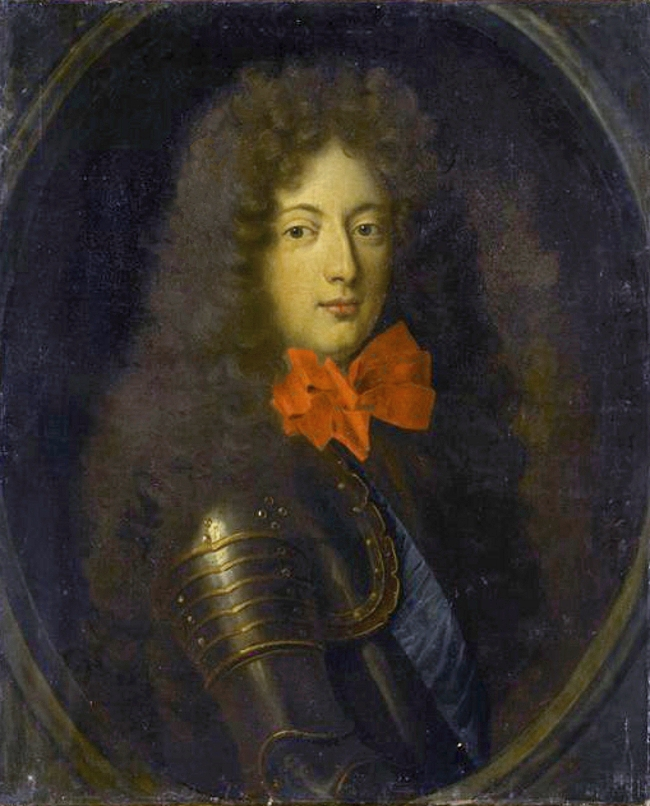
The Chevalier de Lorraine

The Duke of Orléans was infamous for being effeminate and practicing le vice italien ("the Italian vice"), being homosexual or bisexual. He had children from both of his arranged marriages but had many male (and possibly also some female) lovers before and during them. One of these lovers was Philippe of Lorraine (1643–1702), known as the Chevalier de Lorraine ("Knight of Lorraine"), a man described as having an attractive face and a sharp mind, but also being "insinuating, brutal and devoid of scruple", as well as being "as greedy as a vulture". The young count became involved with the knight and his circle, which included among others François-Louis, Prince of La Roche-sur-Yon (later titular king of Poland and prince of Conti; 1644–1709). He joined a secret group of young aristocrats called La Sainte Congregation des Glorieux Pédérastes ("Holy Congregation of Glorious Pederasts").

When the king learned of his son's involvement with the duke's circles, he exiled the Chevalier de Lorraine and several other members of the "congregation". He reprimanded his son and decided to send him away from the royal court. It was suggested that 15-year-old Vermandois should be married as soon as possible to cover up the scandal, possibly to 6-year-old Louise-Bénédicte de Bourbon, Mademoiselle d'Enghien (1676–1753), the daughter of Henri-Jules, Duke of Enghien (later Prince of Condé; 1643–1709).

== Exile and death ==
In June 1682, Vermandois was exiled to Normandy. Others were exiled, too, including the Prince de La Roche-sur-Yon (nephew of the Prince de Condé), the Prince de Turenne, the Marquis de Créquy, the Chevalier de Sainte-Maure, the Chevalier de Mailly, and the Comte de Roucy. Hoping to mend the relationship between father and son, his aunt Madame suggested that he be sent as a soldier to Flanders, then under French occupation. Agreeing with his sister-in-law, the king sent his son to the Siege of Kortrijk, where Vermandois soon fell ill. He was advised by a doctor that he should return to Lille and recover, but, desperate for his father's love, he remained on the battlefield. He died in Flanders on 18 November 1683, and was buried in the Arras Cathedral. His aunt and sister greatly mourned his death, while his father reportedly did not shed a tear. His mother, by then a Carmelite nun under the name of Sœur Louise de la Miséricordie ("Sister Louise of Grace"), was still obsessed with the sin of her affair with the king and said upon hearing the news of her son's death, "I ought to weep for his birth far more than his death".

In 1745, an anonymous writer published a book in Amsterdam, Mémoires pour servir à l'Histoire de la Perse, romanticising life at the French Court in the form of Persian history. Members of the royal family and locations were given fictitious Persian names, and their key was published in the book's third edition (1759). In this tale, Vermandois is alleged to have struck his half-brother, Louis, Grand Dauphin, causing the King to banish him to life imprisonment, first at the Île Sainte-Marguerite and later at the Bastille, where he was made to wear a mask whenever he was to be seen or attended to, when sick or in other circumstances, and would later become known as the legendary Man in the Iron Mask. In reality, there are no historical records of gossip confirming that Vermandois ever struck the Grand Dauphin, or been imprisoned. Furthermore, in 1769 a Jesuit named Henri Griffet, who had been chaplain of the Bastille from 1745, published a book with unquestionable evidence that the prisoner known as the Man in the Iron Mask had died at the Bastille on Monday, 19 November 1703.

== Sources ==
- Crompton, Louis (2009). Homosexuality and Civilization. Cambridge, Ma.: Harvard University Press. ISBN 978-0-674-03006-0.
- Noone, John (1988). The Man behind the Mask (hardcover). Gloucester: Alan Sutton. ISBN 978-0-86299-475-4.
- Riley, Philip F. (2001). A Lust for Virtue: Louis XIV's Attack on Sin in Seventeenth-century France. Santa Barbara, Ca.: Greenwood Publishing. ISBN 978-0-313-31708-8.
- Rowlands, Guy (2002). The Dynastic State and the Army under Louis XIV: Royal Service and Private Interest, 1661-1701. Cambridge: Cambridge University Press. ISBN 978-0-521-64124-1.

Louis, Count of Vermandois House of Bourbon Born: October 2 1667 Died: November 18 1683
French nobility
Vacant Merged into the crown Title last held by Eleanor	Count of Vermandois; 1669–1683	Succeeded by None
Preceded by César de Bourbon	Admiral of France; 1669–1683	Succeeded by Louis-Alexandre de Bourbon
