= Crétin =

Crétin is a French-language surname. Notable people with the surname include:

- Guillaume Crétin (c. 1460 – 1525), a French poet
- Joseph Crétin (1799–1857), an American bishop
- Léonce Crétin (1910–1994), a French cross-country skier
- Dylan Cretin (born 1997), a French rugby player

== See also ==
- Crépin
- Cretin
