= Crépin =

Crépin is a French surname. Notable people with the surname include:

- Alain Crépin (born 1954), Belgian saxophonist and composer
- François Crépin (1830–1903), Belgian botanist
- Jean Crépin (1908–1996), French Army general
- Louis-Philippe Crépin (1772–1851), French painter
- Malin Crépin (born 1978), Swedish actress
- Margit Otto-Crépin (1945–2020), French equestrian

== See also ==
- Saint-Crépin (disambiguation), various communes in France
- Crépin Point, headland in the South Shetland Islands
