= William X of Aquitaine =

Duke of Aquitaine from 1126 to 1137

William X

Duke of Aquitaine
- Reign: 10 February 1126 – 9 April 1137
- Born: c. 1099; Toulouse, France
- Died: 9 April 1137 (aged 37–38); Santiago de Compostela, Castile
- Spouse: Aénor de Châtellerault (m. 1121; died 1130)
- Issue: Eleanor, Queen of England and France; Petronilla, Countess of Vermandois; William Aigret
- House: Poitiers
- Father: William IX, Duke of Aquitaine
- Mother: Philippa, Countess of Toulouse

William X (Occitan: Guillém X; c. 1099 – 9 April 1137), called the Saint, was Duke of Aquitaine, Duke of Gascony, and Count of Poitou from 1126 to 1137.

== Early life ==
William was the son of William IX by his second wife Philippa of Toulouse. He was born in Toulouse during the brief period when his parents ruled the capital. His birth is recorded in the Chronicle of Saint-Maixent for the year 1099: Willelmo comiti natus est filius, equivoce Guillelmus vocatus ('a son was born to Count William, named William like himself'). Later that same year, much to Philippa's ire, Duke William IX mortgaged Toulouse to Philippa's cousin, Bertrand of Toulouse, and then left on crusade.

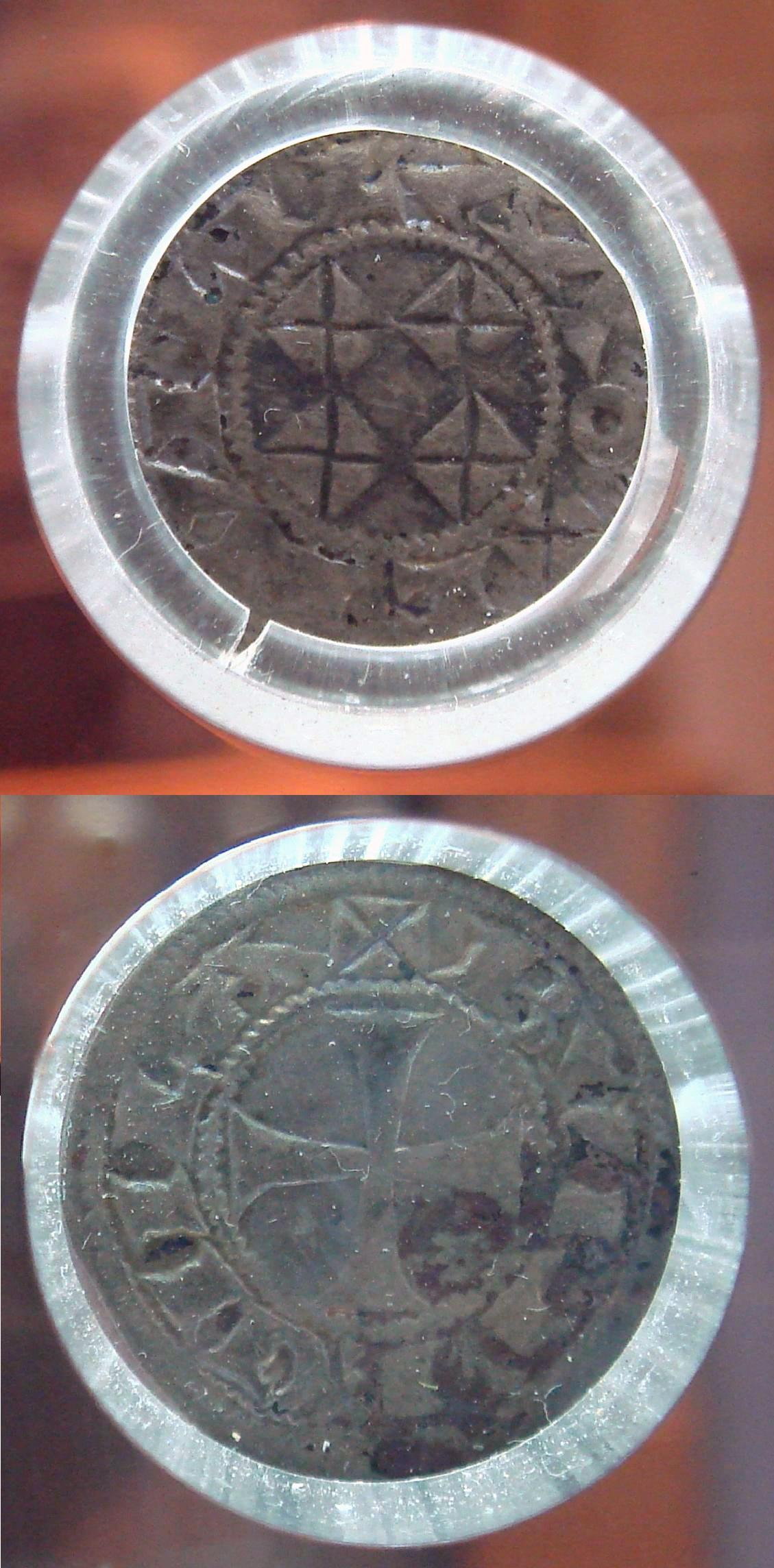
Coin of William X 0,890g.

William and his mother, Philippa, were left in Poitiers. When his father, William IX returned from his unsuccessful crusade, he took up with Dangerose, the wife of a vassal, and set aside his rightful wife, Philippa. This caused strain between father and son until 1121 when William X married Aénor de Châtellerault, a daughter of his father's mistress Dangerose by her first husband, Aimery. William succeeded to the duchy of Aquitaine in 1126.

== Marriage and issue ==
William and Aénor had:

- Eleanor, who inherited the duchy;
- Petronilla, who married Ralph I of Vermandois
- William Aigret, who died at age 4 in 1130, about the time his mother died

== Duke ==
William administered his Aquitaine duchy as both a lover of the arts and a warrior. He became involved in conflicts with Normandy, which he raided in 1136 in alliance with Geoffrey V, Count of Anjou, who claimed it in his wife Matilda's name and for France.

Even inside his borders, William faced an alliance of the Lusignans and the Parthenays against him, an issue resolved with total destruction of the enemies. In international politics, William X initially supported antipope Anacletus II in the papal schism of 1130, opposite to Pope Innocent II, against the will of his own bishops. In 1134, Saint Bernard of Clairvaux convinced William to drop his support for Anacletus and join Innocent.

== Conversion ==
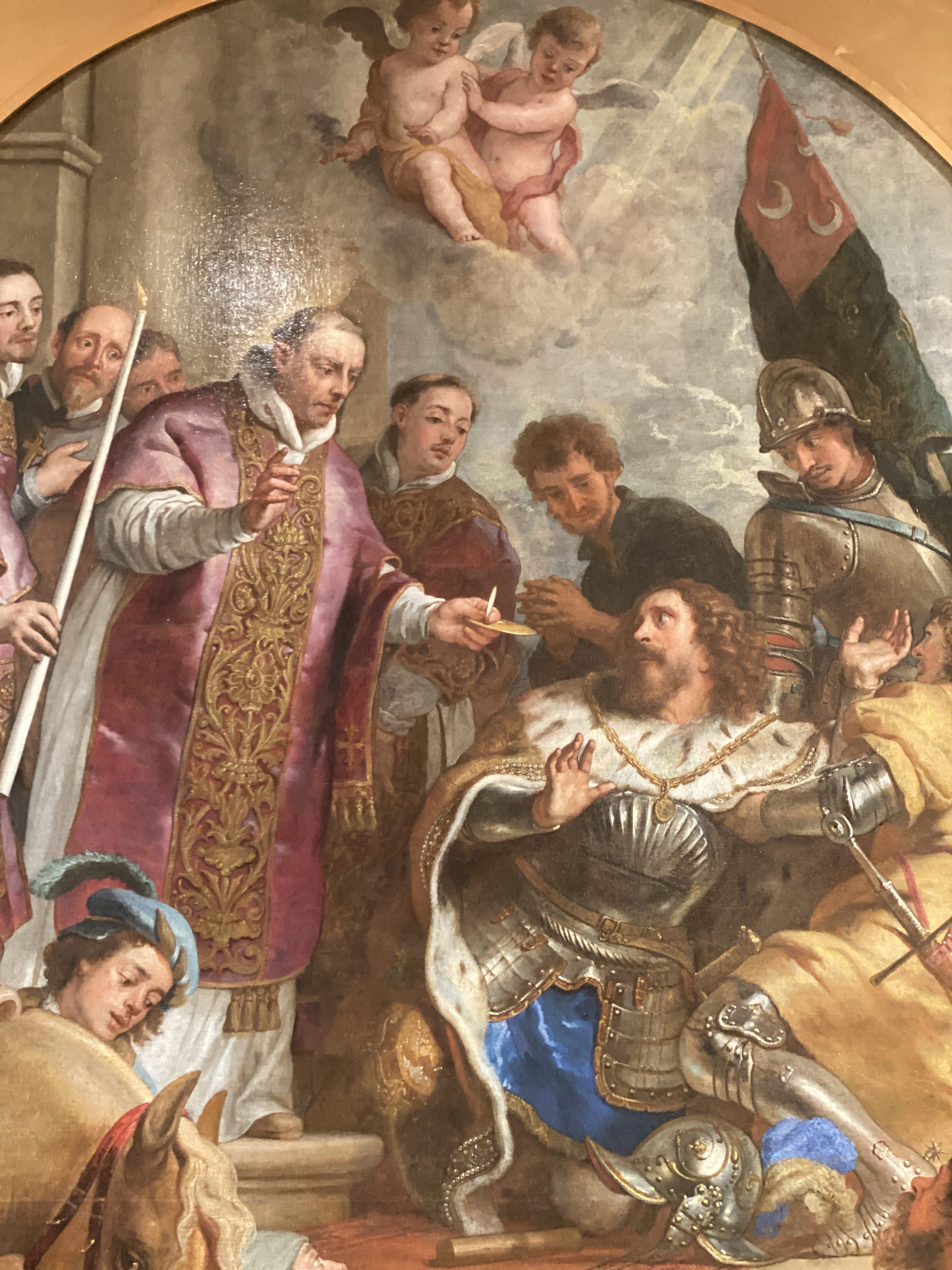
Depiction of the Conversion of William of Aquitaine X at Speed Museum of Art in Louisville

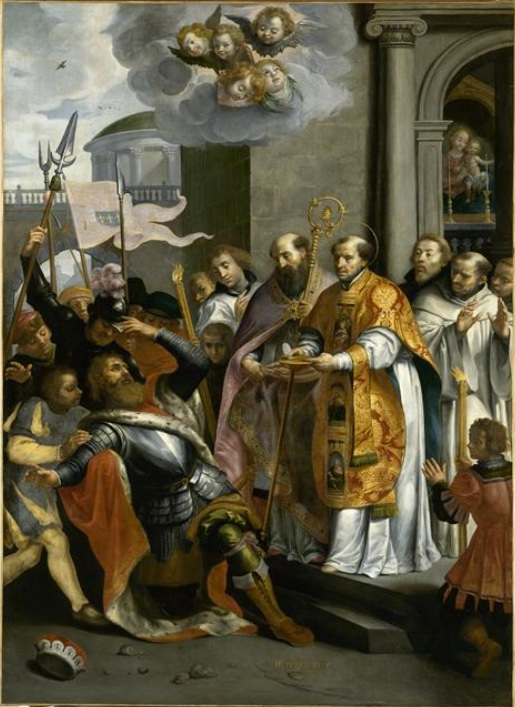
Saint Bernard and the Duke of Aquitaine, by Marten Pepijn

During St. Bernard's time spent with William, he invited him to attend mass at the La Couldre church. During communion, Bernard went to the door with the Eucharist on the sacred paten and pointed the Host toward him and asked him not to look at God as he did his servants.

In 1137, William joined the pilgrimage to Santiago de Compostela, but died during the trip.

== Death ==
On his deathbed, he expressed his wish to see king Louis VI of France as protector of his fifteen-year-old daughter Eleanor, and to find her a suitable husband. Louis VI naturally accepted this guardianship and married the heiress of Aquitaine to his own son, Louis VII.

== In culture ==
William's conversion and death are the subject of the dramma sacro La conversione e morte di San Guglielmo by Giovanni Battista Pergolesi, completed in 1731.

== See also ==
- Dukes of Aquitaine family tree

== Sources ==
- Beech, George T. (1995). "Aquitaine". In Kibler, William W.; Zinn, Grover A. (eds.). Medieval France: An Encyclopedia. Garland Publishing, Inc. pp. 55–57.
- Brown, Elizabeth A.R. (2002). "Eleanor of Aquitaine Reconsidered: The Woman and Her Seasons". In Wheeler, B.; Parsons, John C. (eds.). Eleanor of Aquitaine: Lord and Lady. Palgrave Macmillan. pp. 1–54.
- Gildas, M. (1907). "St. Bernard of Clairvaux". The Catholic Encyclopedia. Robert Appleton Company.
- Hanley, Catherine (2022). Two Houses, Two Kingdoms: A History of France and England, 1100-1300. Yale University Press.50
- Martindale, Jane (2001). "'An unfinished business': Angevin Politics and the Siege of Toulouse, 1153". In Gillingham, John (ed.). Anglo-Norman Studies XXIII: Proceedings of the Battle Conference 2000. The Boydell Press. pp. 115–154.
- Reilly, Bernard F. (1995). The Contest of Christian and Muslim Spain, 1031-1157. Blackwell Publishing.
- Vones-Liebenstein, Ursula (2016). "From Aquitaine to Provence: The struggle for influence during the schism of 1130". In Doran, John; Smith, Damian J. (eds.). Pope Innocent II (1130–43): The World vs the City. Routledge. pp. 152–171.

French nobility
Preceded by William IX	Duke of Aquitaine; Count of Poitiers; 1126–1137	Succeeded by Eleanor
