= Adalbert II, Count of Vermandois =

French noble and agnatic descendant of charlemagne

Herbert III
- Tenure: 1015
- Predecessor: Herbert III
- Successor: Otto
- Born: c. 980
- Died: 1015
- Noble family: Carolingian dynasty, Herbertine Branch
- Father: Herbert III, Count of Vermandois
- Mother: Hermengarde

Adalbert II, Count of Vermandois (c. 980 – 1015), also called Albert II, was the son of Herbert III of Vermandois and Hermengarde. He was a member of the Carolingian dynasty, specifically the Herbertine branch. He was the 6th great-grandson of Charlemagne. Little is known about Adalbert, as he died without children, and only a few months after his accession, passing the county to his brother, Otto of Vermandois.
