= Philip I of Flanders =

Count of Flanders from 1168 to 1191

Philip I
- Count of Flanders
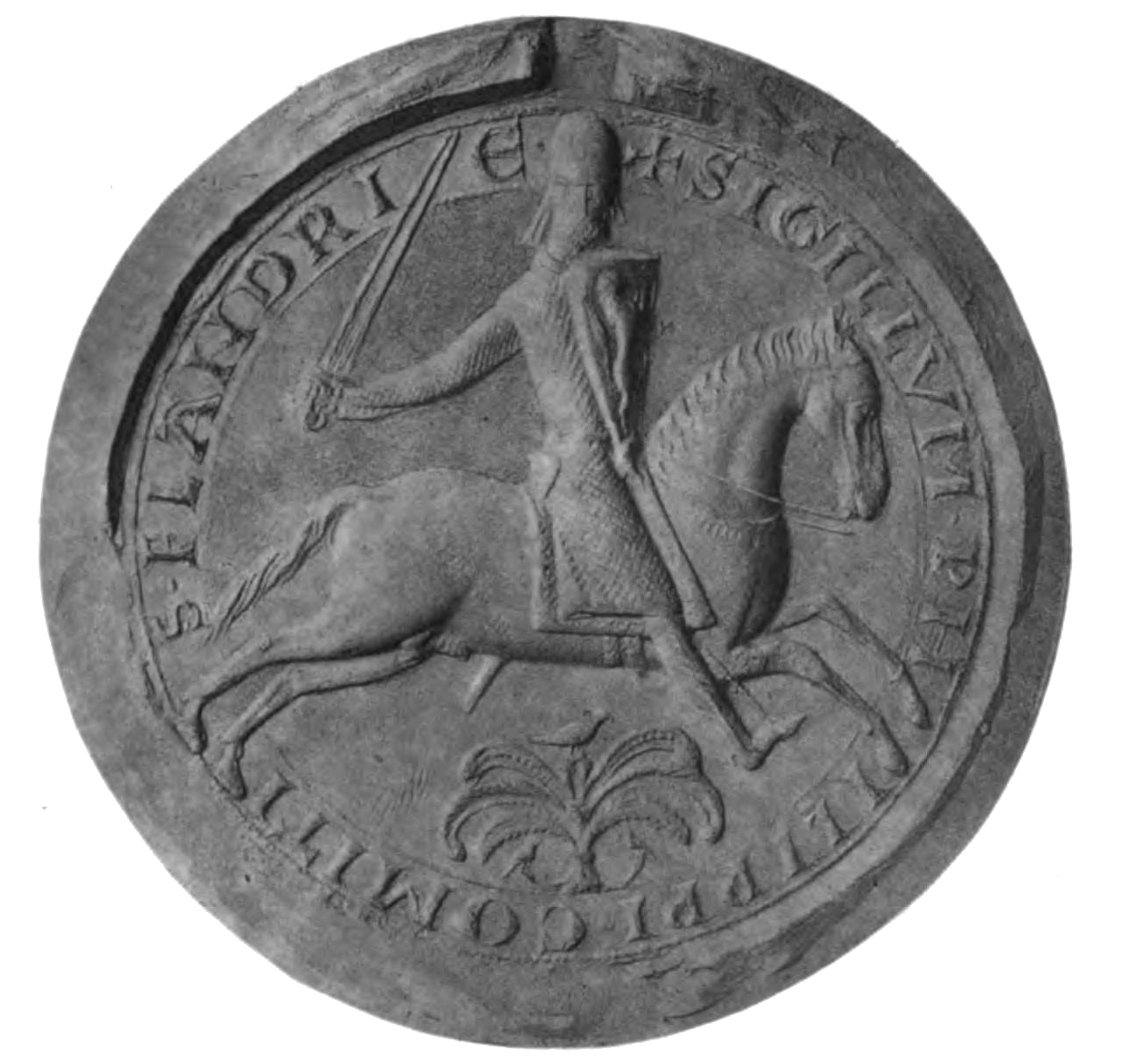
- Seal of Philip
- Born: 1143
- Died: 1 August 1191 (aged 47–48); Acre
- Noble family: House of Alsace
- Spouses: Elisabeth of Vermandois; Theresa of Portugal
- Issue: Thierry of Flanders (ill.)
- Father: Thierry, Count of Flanders
- Mother: Sibylla of Anjou

Philip I (1143 – 1 August 1191), commonly known as Philip of Alsace, was count of Flanders from 1168 to 1191. Philip took the title of Count of Flanders already in 1157, when his parents Thierry of Flanders and Sibylla of Anjou left Flanders on crusade. After the return of his father Thierry, Philip co-ruled with him until his fathers' death in 1168. During his rule Flanders prospered economically. He took part in two crusades and died of disease in the Holy Land during the Third Crusade at the Siege of Acre.

== Count of Flanders ==
Philip was born in 1143 as the second son of Count Thierry of Flanders and Sibylla of Anjou. Philips elder brother Baldwin died in 1150, leaving him as the successor of his father. Already in 1155, at the age of thirteen, his name appears on documents with the title of count ("comes") or appointed count ("comes constitutus"). In 1156, Philip married Elisabeth, elder daughter of count Ralph I of Vermandois and Petronilla of Aquitaine. At Arras on Easter 1157, his father transferred officially his power to Philip before leaving with his wife Sibylla as a crusader to the Holy Land.

In absence of Thierry, Count Floris III of Holland tried to take Zeeland and Waasland, and laid heavy taxes on Flemish merchants travelling by river to the Rhine, but Philip reacted swiftly and his fleet defeated Floris in 1158. Likewise, Philip campaigned in Cambrai when his authority was challenged by the local viscount Simon d'Oisy. After returning from his crusade in 1159, Thiery co-ruled in harmony with Philip. Philip focused on economical and judicial matters, while Thierry limited himself to a more ceremonial role. As the Flemish cloth industry depended heavily on the import of English wool, in 1163 both renewed the secret treaty of Dover of 1101 and promised to side with England in case of conflict between France and England. In 1164 Thierry departed once more for the Holy Land, and after his return in 1166 he was not involved anymore in any governing. Philips travelled to the Imperial Diet in 1165 to advocate better protection for Flemish merchants travelling in the Holy Roman Empire.

When Floris III re-instated the taxes in 1166, and claimed once more suzerainty over Waasland. Philip sailed down the river Scheldt with his fleet and captured Floris. The count of Holland remained in prison in Bruges until 1167, at which point he was being ransomed in exchange for recognition of Flemish suzerainty over Zeeland and Waasland in the treaty of Bruges. The taxes could not be abandoned because these were approved by the Holy Roman Emperor, but they ware halved to 5 percent of the value of the goods. In case of conflict, the Flemish merchants could bring their case before the court in their own town and not in Holland.

Upon the abdication of his brother-in-law Ralph II in 1167, Elisabeth and Philip inherited the County of Vermandois. This pushed Flemish authority further south, to its greatest extent thus far, and threatened to completely alter the balance of power in northern France.

Philip governed wisely with the aid of Robert d'Aire, whose role was almost that of a prime minister. They established an effective administrative system and Philip's foreign relations were excellent. He mediated in disputes between Louis VII of France and Henry II of England, between Henry II and Thomas Becket, and arranged the marriage of his sister Margaret with Count Baldwin V of Hainaut.

Philip and Elisabeth were childless. In 1175, Philip discovered that Elisabeth was committing adultery and had her lover, Walter de Fontaines, beaten to death. Philip then obtained complete control of her lands in Vermandois from King Louis VII of France. Philip's brothers Matthew and Peter of Alsace died in 1173 and 1176 respectively. In 1177, before going on crusade, he designated Margaret and Baldwin as his heirs.

== Philip's first crusade ==
Philip's grandfather Robert I had campaigned in the Holy Land, his uncle Robert II was one of the leaders of the First Crusade and his father Thierry went four times to the Holy Land, participating in the Second Crusade. His father had returned disillusioned from the Holy Land, where on multiple occasions he was forced to hand over his military conquests to local nobility. Hence when Philip took the vow to go on crusade on Good Friday of 1175, he intended to go rather as a pilgrim with limited military ambitions. He embarked on Pentecost 1177 at Wissant with a few Flemish and English knights and arrived in August in Palestine.

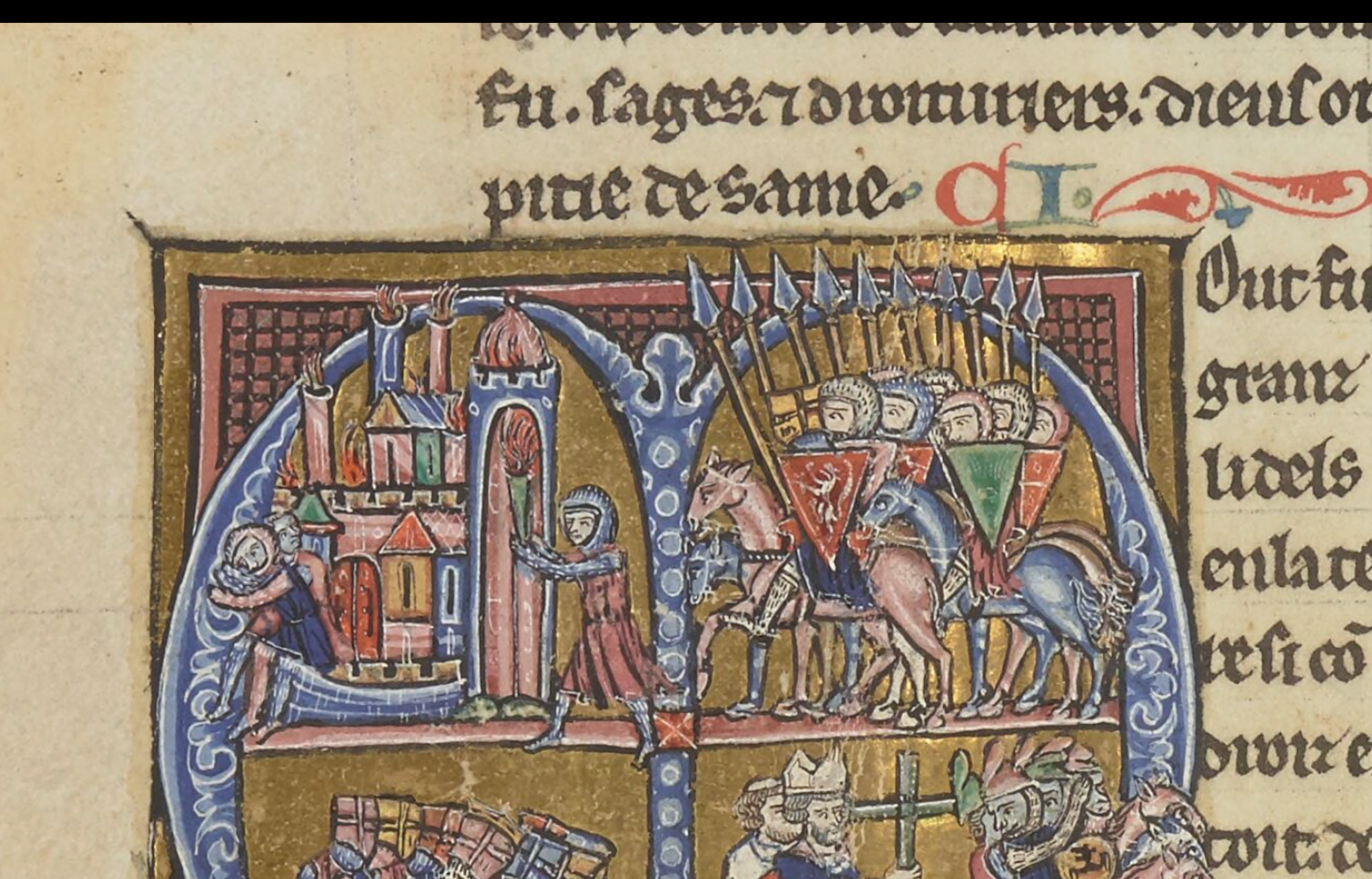
Philip I of Flanders attacks the town of Harim in northern Syria during his crusade of 1177. From an illustrated copy of the Estoire d'Eracles translation of the chronicle of William of Tyre Paris, Bibliothèque nationale de France, MS fr. 9081, f. 280v.

In the Holy Land, King Baldwin IV of Jerusalem hoped that Philip would take the command of a planned invasion of Egypt, for which purpose the crusaders had allied with the Byzantine Empire. A Byzantine fleet of 150 galleys was waiting at Acre when Philip arrived on 2 August 1177. Philip however did not want to take any responsibilities that would jeopardize his timely return to Flanders, and turned down the offer. He also criticized the campaign as ill-timed since at the time of the year the Nile was at it highest level and would impede operations, and he considered it not wise to invade the place where Saladin had amassed his best troops. Philip and King Baldwin IV of Jerusalem were first cousins, sharing a grandfather, King Fulk, whose daughter from his first marriage, Sibylla of Anjou, was Philip's mother. Baldwin IV was a leper and childless, and offered Philip the regency of the Kingdom of Jerusalem as his closest male relative currently present there. Philip refused this as well, saying he was there only as a pilgrim.

Philip left Jerusalem in October to campaign in the north for the Principality of Antioch, participating in the siege of Harim, a city his father Thierry had helped to conquer in 1158, but was now back in the hands of the Malik of Aleppo. The crusaders thought it would be an easy prey as the city had recently revolted against its king, but the city put up a defence and the crusaders had to lay siege. When Saladin sent reinforcements to the region, the crusaders quickly accepted an offer from the city to lift the siege in return for a ransom. On the conclusion of the siege, Philip considered his duty as crusader fulfilled and left the Holy Land. He returned to Flanders through Constantinople and met the Byzantine emperor Manuel I Komnenos, to whom he promised to broker with the French king a marriage for the emperor's son with a French princess, which resulted in 1180 in the marriage of Alexios II Komnenos and Agnes of France.

Meanwhile, the Byzantine alliance against Egypt was abandoned. In his chronicle Historia rerum in partibus transmarinis gestarum ("History of Deeds Done Beyond the Sea"), William of Tyre, chancellor and archbishop of Tyre, blamed Philip for this failure, but historians agree William did not write in good faith as he was deeply involved in the local politics and was rather trying to excuse his own shortcomings in the affair. William could not accept the famous and battle-experienced count did not want to get involved in the affairs of the Holy Land, and suspected that Philips came merely to Jerusalem to get two of his vassals married to Baldwin's sister Sibylla and half-sister Isabella. William also blamed Philips for the botched campaign against Hakim, accusing him of abandoning the siege without a fight, which was contradicted by Arabian sources. But while Philip only participated in a minor campaign, Baldwin IV defeated Saladin in November at the Battle of Montgisard. Philip returned from the holy land to Bruges in October 1178.

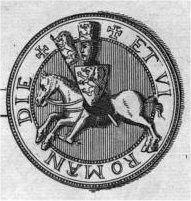
Seal of Philip (1162)

== War with France ==
In 1179 Philip went on pilgrimage to Canterbury together with king Louis Ⅶ, to pray at the grave of the sanctified Thomas Becket for the recovery of Philip II. who was severely ill. Philip II recovered soon, but then Louis fell severely ill himself, at which point he named count Philip guardian of his young son. One year later, Philip of Alsace had his protégé married to his niece, Isabelle of Hainaut, offering the County of Artois and other Flemish territories as dowry, much to the dismay of Baldwin V. When Louis VII died, Philip II began to assert his independence. War broke out in 1180. Picardy and Île-de-France were devastated. King Philip refused to give open battle and gained the upper hand. Baldwin V, at first allied with his brother-in-law, intervened in 1184 on behalf of his son-in-law, King Philip, in support of his daughter's interests. The dispute between Count Philip and Baldwin was encouraged by King Philip, who went so far as to name Baldwin his representative in negotiations with the Count.

Philip's wife, Elisabeth, died in 1183, prompting King Philip II to seize the province of Vermandois on behalf of Elisabeth's sister, Eleonore. Philip then remarried, to Theresa, daughter of Afonso I, the first King of Portugal. Philip gave Theresa a dower that included a number of major Flemish towns, in an apparent slight to Baldwin V. Fearing that he would be surrounded by the royal domain of France and the County of Hainaut, Philip signed a peace treaty with King Philip II and Count Baldwin V on 10 March 1186, recognizing the cession of Vermandois to the king, although he was allowed to retain the title Count of Vermandois for the remainder of his life.

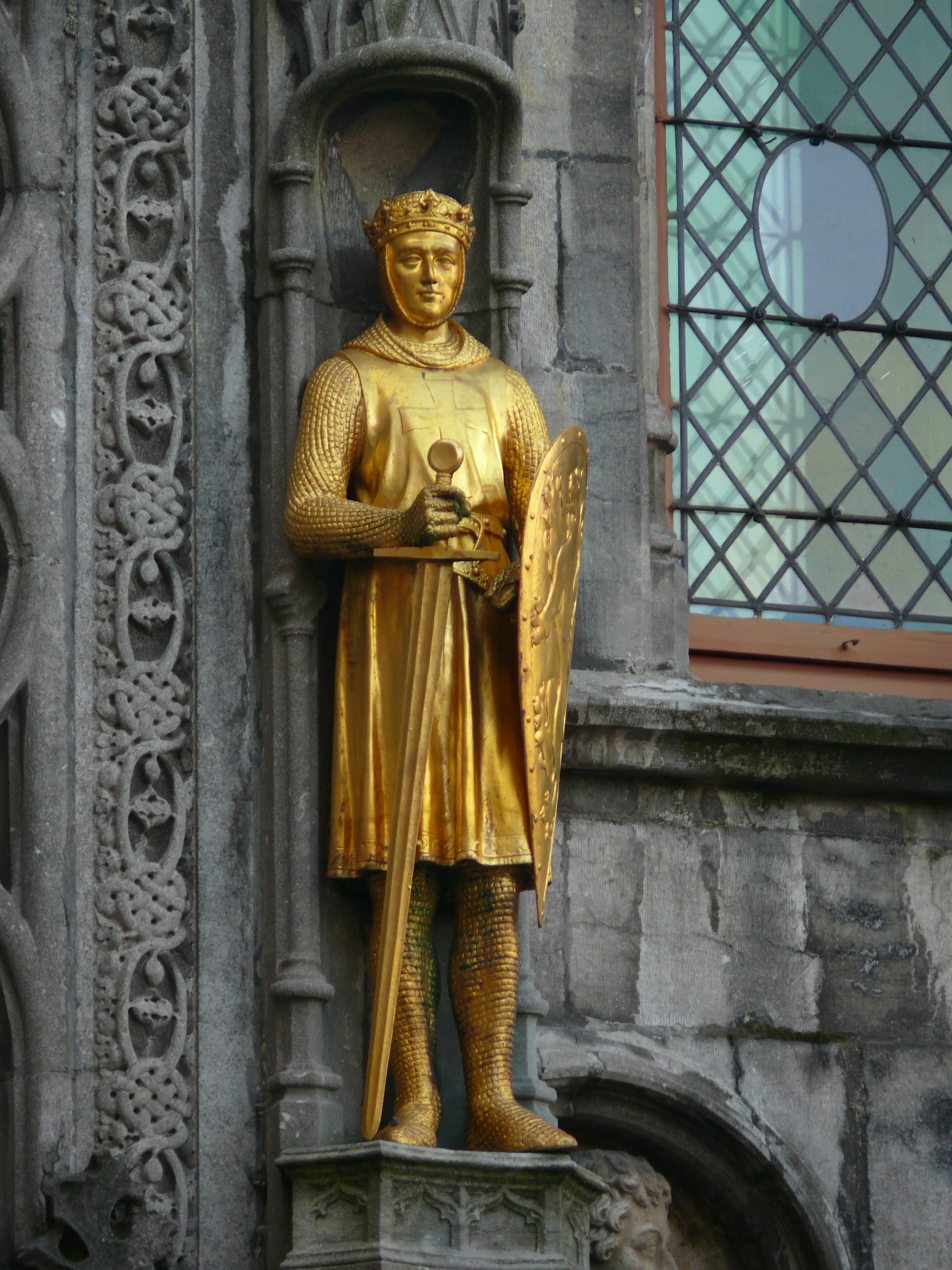
Statue of Philip at the Basilica of the Holy Blood, Bruges

== Philip's second crusade ==
In 1190, Philip took the cross for a second time and joined the Flemish contingents which had already gone to Palestine. After arriving at the Siege of Acre, he was stricken by the epidemic passing through the crusader camp, and died on 1 August 1191. His body was brought back to Flanders by his wife Theresa, who acted as regent during his absence. Philip was buried in Clairvaux Abbey. Since he was unsuccessful in producing an heir with Countess Theresa, he was succeeded by his sister Margaret I and brother-in-law Baldwin VIII.

Philip had an illegitimate son, Thierry, who went on the Fourth Crusade and married the daughter of Isaac Komnenos of Cyprus.

== Legacy ==
19th century portrait of Philip by Albrecht De Vriendt

Philip seems to represent the end of one kind of feudal world and the beginning of a new type of sovereignty, put into practice by King Philip: for the first time, a king of France ruled over a count of Flanders. Despite a costly war, the economic expansion of Flanders did not stop, as witnessed by the number of communal charters signed by Count Philip. By the end of his reign, the county had entered into a period of unprecedented prosperity.

Philip was the patron of Chrétien de Troyes while he was writing the last of his five chivalric romances, Perceval, the Story of the Grail. In the opening lines, Chrétien honors Philip for giving him the order to write the "best tale ever told in a royal court", and for providing him with a book that he could use as a base for his Perceval story. The work remained unfinished but due to its ethical and religious themes it is considered his most important one.

== Sources ==
- Baldwin, John W. (1986). The Government of Philip Augustus: Foundations of French Royal Power in the Middle Ages. University of California Press.
- De Maesschalck, Edward (2012). De graven Van Vlaanderen 861-1384. Leuven: Davidsfonds. ISBN 9789058269010.
- De Maesschalck, Edward (2019). De Graven van Vlaanderen (861-1384) [The Counts of Flanders (861-1384)] (in Dutch) (2nd ed.). DavidsFonds / Standaard uitgeverij. ISBN 9789002268458.
- Gislebertus (of Mons) (2005). Chronicle of Hainaut. Translated by Napran, Laura. The Boydell Press.
- George, Hereford Brooke (1875). Genealogical Tables Illustrative of Modern History. Oxford at the Clarendon Press.
- Hellinga, Gerben Graddesz (2013). Graven Van Vlaanderen [Counts Of Flanders] (in Dutch). Zutphen: Walburg pers. ISBN 9789057309250.
- Lacy, Norris J. (1991). "Chrétien de Troyes". In Lacy, Norris J. (ed.). The New Arthurian Encyclopedia. Garland. ISBN 0-8240-4377-4.
- Longnon, J. (1978). Les compagnons de Villehardouin: Recherches sur les croisés de la quatrième croisade. Librairie Droz.
- Nicholas, David M (1992). Medieval Flanders. Routledge.
- de Troyes, Chretien (2015). The Complete Story of the Grail: Chretien de Troyes Perceval and its continuations. Translated by Bryant, Nigel. D.S. Brewer.
- Van Werveke, Hans (1976). Een Vlaamse graaf van Europees formaat [A Flemish count of European stature] (in Dutch). Bussum: Fibula - Van Dishoeck. ISBN 9022835650.
- Wolff, Robert Lee (July 1952). "Baldwin of Flanders and Hainaut, First Latin Emperor of Constantinople: His Life, Death, and Resurrection, 1172–1225". Speculum. 27 (3): 281–322. doi:10.2307/2853088. JSTOR 2853088. S2CID 163762031.

Preceded by Thierry	Count of Flanders; 1168–1191	Succeeded by Margaret I
Preceded by Ralph II	Count of Vermandois; 1167–1183 with Elisabeth	Succeeded by Eleanor
