= Raoul de Faye =

Aquitanian royal official

- Seneschal of Poitou
- Born: c. 1100
- Died: 1190
- Spouse(s): Elisabeth de Faye
- Father: Aimery I, Viscount of Châtellerault
- Mother: Dangereuse de l'Isle Bouchard

Raoul de Faye (c. 1100–1190) was the seneschal of Poitou during the time of Henry II and Eleanor of Aquitaine. He was the uncle of Eleanor of Aquitaine and was her most trusted adviser during the years she lived in Poitiers, beginning in 1168.

Earlier in his life, he was in the favor of Henry II, frequently serving as a witness to royal charters. He was twice involved in negotiating the marriages of Henry and Eleanor's children, the child Eleanor in 1170 and the future King John in 1173.

Raoul, sometimes also known as Ralph, featured in an anecdote related by Gerald of Wales in his Gemma ecclesiastica. During a hunting expedition with Henry at Woodstock, he defied the injunction against hunting on Holy Days. He fell from his horse into a bush and was blinded in one eye. This tale featured in many lectures and sermons of the era as the clergy disputed the King's hunting excesses.

Over time Raoul's relationship with Henry soured, and he later became heavily involved in the rebellions of Henry's sons against Henry.
