= Parliamentary cretinism =

Pejorative political expression

Parliamentary cretinism (German: parlamentarische Kretinismus) is a pejorative term within Marxist discourse initially referring fixation on parliamentary proeceedings in political conflict to the exclusion of other things, in particular in the context of socialist politics appealing to exclusively parliamentary means, specifically in the 19th century, associated with claims that it means 'confimenent to an imaginary world'. The term has been used by political theorist August Nimtz to critique liberal electoralism in the United States, and it inspired his concept of voting fetishism.

== Concept ==
The term parliamentary cretinism was originally coined by Karl Marx in chapter five of his 1852 political book, the Eighteenth Brumaire of Louis Bonaparte, published in 1852 following Louis Napoleon's coup d'état in France. Marx and Engels considered this a fatal delusion for the socialist movement, believing it would only waste time and allow reactionary forces to grow stronger. Marx, particularly, held the view that parliaments are indirectly representing the interests of classes but resolve problems superficially, with its politics ideologically displaced and abstracted from social conditions. This means, for Marx, that parliamentary cretinism creates an imaginary world without sense, memory, and understanding of the real world. This condition perpetuates parliamentarism by defending it against the proletariat through the destruction of the Parliament itself to reinforce the executive branch.

Friedrich Engels wrote:

'Parliamentary cretinism' is an incurable disease, an ailment whose unfortunate victims are permeated by the lofty conviction that the whole world, its history and its future are directed and determined by a majority of votes of just that very representative institution that has the honour of having them in the capacity of its members.
