= Herbert III of Vermandois =

French noble (953–1015)

Herbert III
- Tenure: 987-1015
- Predecessor: Adalbert I
- Successor: Adalbert II
- Born: 953
- Died: 1015
- Noble family: Carolingian dynasty, Herbertine Branch
- Spouse: Hermengarde
- Issue: Adalbert II; Eudes
- Father: Albert I of Vermandois
- Mother: Gerberge of Lorraine

Herbert III of Vermandois (953–1015), Count of Vermandois, was the son of Adalbert I of Vermandois and Gerberge of Lorraine. During his lifetime he was the eldest male-line descendant of Charlemagne, as his 5th great-grandson, through Bernard of Italy.

== Biography ==
Two charters of the Montier-en-Der Abbey (968 and 980) are attributed to Herbert III of Vermandois, then the count of Chateau-Thierry, Vitry and lay abbot of the Abbey of Saint-Médard of Soissons, the title of "Count of the Franks". This title can be compared to that of Duke of the Franks used by Robertians and that made them second in the Kingdom after the king of the Franks.

In 990, Herbert and his wife, Hermengarde, founded the Chapter of the Collegiate Church of Saint-Florent in Roye, under the title of St. George for 25 canons.

== Family ==
Herbert married Hermengarde (946 – after 1035). They had:

- Adalbert II, Count of Vermandois, who died the year of his accession.
- Otto, Count of Vermandois

== Sources ==
- Bachrach, Bernard S.; Bachrach, David S. (2018). Deeds of the Bishops of Cambrai. Routledge.
- Bouchard, Constance Brittain (2001). Those of My Blood: Creating Noble Families in Medieval Francia. University of Pennsylvania Press.
- Heuduin, Albert (1939). "Rôle prépondérant de Guillaume Bouillé au Procès de Réhabilitation de Jeanne d'Arc". Bulletin trimestriel de la Société des Antiquaires de Picardie. 2e trimestre: 75–794. "Le Chapitre de la collegiale de Roye avait ete fonde en l'an 990 pour 20 chanoines et 15 chapelains, par Herbert III, comte de Vermandois et sa femme Hermengarde, dans l'eglise Saint-Georges de Roye."
- Le Jan, Régine (2003). Famille et pouvoir dans le monde franc (VIIe-Xe siècle) (in French). Publications de la Sorbonne.

Preceded by Adalbert I	Count of Vermandois; 987–1015	Succeeded by Adalbert II, Count of Vermandois
