= Bernard II of Laon =

Frankish Noble

Bernard II, Count of Laon (c. 845 – before 893) was a Frankish noble and a member of the Herbertien dynasty, a branch of the Carolingian dynasty. He was a descendant of Pepin of Italy and Charlemagne.

He was the first son of Pepin, first count of Vermandois, lord of Senlis, Péronne, and Saint Quentin. In 877/878 he was appointed Count of Laon by Charles the Bald. sometime he went to Parma in Italy.

Bernard II's wife is unknown.
