= Otto of Vermandois =

French noble

Otto
- Tenure: 1015-1045
- Predecessor: Adalbert II
- Successor: Herbert IV
- Born: 979
- Died: 1045
- Noble family: Carolingian dynasty, Herbertine Branch
- Spouse: Pavia
- Issue: Herbert IV, Count of Vermandois Odo I of Furneaux Peter (Pierre)
- Father: Herbert III, Count of Vermandois
- Mother: Hermengarde

Otto (or Eudes) of Vermandois (29 August 979 – 25 May 1045), Count of Vermandois, was the son of Herbert III, Count of Vermandois and Hermengarde of Bar-sur-Seine. Otto donated property to Notre-Dame de Homblières by charter. He acceded to the county after the death of his older brother, Adalbert II, Count of Vermandois, in 1015.

== Family and children ==
He married Pavia (or Patia) (b. 990). Their children were:

1. Herbert IV, Count of Vermandois.
2. Eudes
3. Peter (Pierre Karling)

== Sources ==
- Bachrach, Bernard S.; Bachrach, David S. (2018). Deeds of the Bishops of Cambrai. Routledge.
- Le Jan, Régine (2003). Famille et pouvoir dans le monde franc (VIIe-Xe siècle) (in French). Publications de la Sorbonne.
