= Ralph II of Vermandois =

French noble; Capetian count of Vermandois

Ralph II

Count of Vermandois and Valois
- Reign: 1152 - 1167
- Predecessor: Ralph I
- Successor: Elisabeth
- Born: 1145
- Died: 3 June 1167 (aged 21–22)
- Spouse: Margaret of Alsace
- House: Capet
- Father: Ralph I, Count of Vermandois
- Mother: Petronilla of Aquitaine

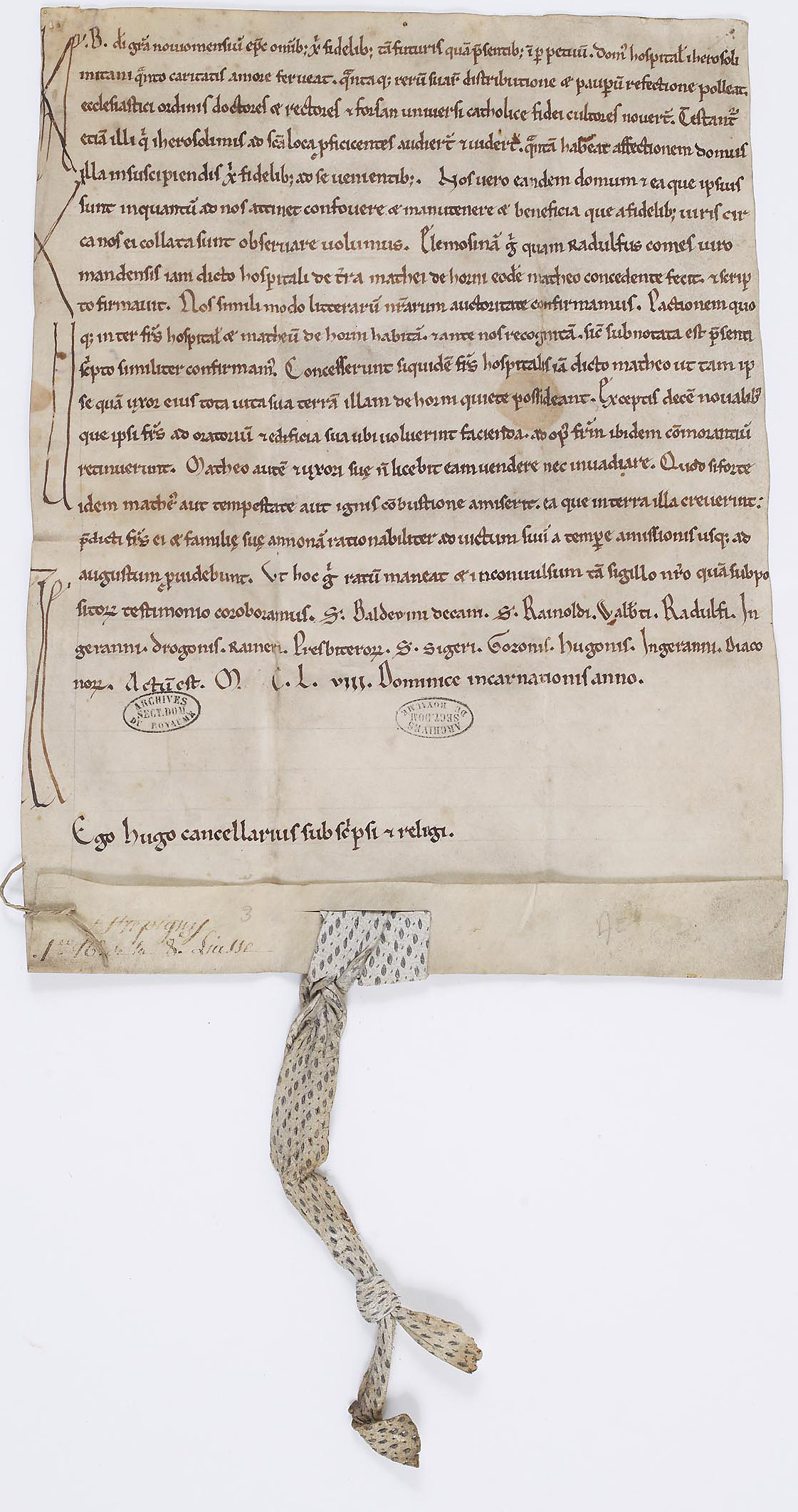
Document, by Baldwin II of Boulogne, Bishop of Noyon, confirming a donation by Ralph to the Knights Hospitallers in Éterpigny.

Ralph II (French: Raoul 1145-3 June 1167), known as the Younger and the Leper, was the count of Vermandois and Valois from 1152 to 1167. Ralph was the son of Ralph I, whom he succeeded, and Petronilla of Aquitaine. Around 1160 he married Margaret of Alsace (c. 1145-1194). He began suffering from leprosy around 1163, his marriage could not be consummated and was broken up. Having no descendants, he abdicated in favor of his sister Elisabeth and her husband Philip in 1167.

Coat of arms of the capetian counts of Vermandois

== Bibliography ==
Louis Duval-Arnould, “The last years of the leper count Raoul de Vermandois (c. 1147-1167…) and the devolution of his provinces to Philippe d’Alsace”, in Bibliothèque de l’école des chartes, no 142-1, 1984, p. 81-92, [read online [archive]].

Preceded by Ralph I	Count of Vermandois; 1152–1167	Succeeded by Elisabeth
Preceded by Ralph I	Count of Valois; 1152-1167	Succeeded by Elisabeth
