= Herbert I of Vermandois =

Count of Soissons (c. 848/850–907)

Herbert I

Count of Soissons
- Reign: 889–907
- Predecessor: position established
- Successor: Herbert II

Count of Vermandois
- Reign: 893–907
- Predecessor: Pepin II
- Successor: Herbert II
- Born: c. 848/850
- Died: 907
- Issue: Beatrice; Herbert II; Cunegonda
- Dynasty: Carolingian
- Father: Pepin of Vermandois

Herbert I (c. 848/850 – 907) or Heribertus I, Count of Vermandois, Count of Soissons, and lay abbot of Saint Quentin, which his grandfather had been Lord of, and Saint-Crépin. He was a Carolingian noble who played a significant role in Francia.

Herbert was the son of Pepin I of Vermandois and a great-grandson of Pepin of Italy, son of Charlemagne. He was possibly a matrilineal descendant of the Nibelungids. His early life was unknown, but he became count of Soissons and count of Vermandois before 890, including the strongholds of Péronne and Meulan, and was probably charged with defending the Oise against Viking intrusions. In 893 he inherited the County of Vermandois from his brother, Pepin II. Pepin II did have a son, Pepin III, though he inherited Senlis.

A contemporary of Baldwin II, Count of Flanders he had the advantage of being a Carolingian, a great-grandson of Pepin of Italy, a son of Charlemagne. Herbert controlled both St. Quentin and Péronne and his activities in the upper Somme river valley, such as the capture and murder (rather than ransom) of his brother Raoul in 896, may have caused Baldwin II to have him assassinated in 907.

Herbert arranged a marriage alliance to Robert of Neustria by giving in marriage his daughter Beatrice as Robert's second wife. As a part of this pact Herbert also agreed to his son Herbert II of Vermandois marrying Adela, Robert's daughter by his first wife. Another daughter, Cunegonda, married Odo of Wetterau.

== Issue ==
By an unknown partner:

1. Beatrice of Vermandois (c. 880- aft. 26 March 931) married Robert of Neustria. Grandmother of Hugh Capet.
2. Herbert II of Vermandois (c. 880- d. 943), married Adela of Neustria.
3. Cunegonda of Vermandois, married Odo of Wetterau (895- 949). (Note: McKitterick simply states a daughter of Herbert married Odo of Wetterau and gives no name.)

== Sources ==
- Dunbabin, Jean (2000). France in the making, 843-1180. Oxford University Press.
- McKitterick, Rosamond (1999). The Frankish Kingdoms under the Carolingians. Pearson Education Limited.
- Riché, Pierre (1993). The Carolingians; A Family who Forged Europe. Translated by Allen, Michael Idomir. University of Pennsylvania Press.
- Settipani, Christian (1993). La Préhistoire des Capétiens. P. van Kerrebrouck.

Preceded by Pepin II	Count of Vermandois; 892-907	Succeeded by Herbert II
Unknown	Count of Soissons; 889–907	Succeeded by Herbert II
