= Count of Vermandois =

List of counts of the Vermandois region by dynasty

- Creation date: 484
- First holder: Leodegar, Count of Vermandois
- Last holder: Louis de Bourbon
- Extinction date: 1214

The count of Vermandois was the ruler of the county of Vermandois.

== Beneficiary counts of Vermandois ==
- Leodegar, Count of Vermandois (c. 484).
- Emerannus (c. 511), son of previous.
- Wagon I (c. 550).
- Wagon II (c. 600), son of previous.
- Garifrede (c. 660).
- Ingomar, Count of Vermandois (c. 680).

== Beneficiary counts of Vermandois and abbots of Saint Quentin de Monte ==
- Bernard, son of Charles Martel, abbot of St Quentin de Monte (now Mont-Saint-Quentin near Péronne).
- Jerome, brother of previous, count of Vermandois and abbot of St Quentin de Monte (714–771).
- Fulrad son of previous, abbot of St Quentin de Monte (after 771).
- Guntard, Count of Vermandois (771–833) and then abbot of St Quentin de Monte (till 833).
- Hugh, son of Charlemagne, abbot of St Quentin de Monte (833–844).
- Adalard, Count of Vermandois, son of Gisla, granddaughter of Charlemagne, count of Vermandois (833–864) and then abbot of St Quentin de Monte (844–864).
- Baldwin Iron Arm abbot of St Quentin de Monte (864–879).
- Teutricius (864–886) and then abbot of St Quentin de Monte (879–886) or Theodoric, Count of Vermandois (c. 876), a descendant of Childebrand, brother of Charles Martel.

== Carolingian counts ==
- Pepin I
- Pepin II
- Herbert I, also count of Senlis
- Herbert II
- Adalbert I, also lord of Péronne and St Quentin
- Herbert III
- Adalbert II
- Otto
- Herbert IV
- Adelaide

== Capetian counts ==
Coat of arms of the Capetian counts of Vermandois

- Hugh, also count of Valois (Note: All of Herbert's lands went to Hugh upon Herbert's death in 1080, giving the Capetians an important foothold.) by marriage
- Ralph I
- Ralph II, son of Ralph I and Petronilla of Aquitaine
- Elisabeth
- Eleanor; died either childless or without any designated heirs, lands passed to French crown

Philip II of France added Vermandois to the royal domain.

Flag of Surrey, registered 2014. It was derived from William de Warenne, 2nd Earl of Surrey, who married Elizabeth, the daughter of Hugh the Great

== Bourbon counts ==
- Louis de Bourbon, comte de Vermandois (1669–1683), illegitimate son of Louis XIV and Louise de la Vallière, title held by appanage.

== See also ==
- Vermandois

== Sources ==
- Anselme, Histoire Genealogique de la Maison royale de France, 1726.
- M. Fouquier-Cholet, Histoire des Comtes héréditaires du Vermandois, Saint-Quentin, 1832.
- Ioh. Mabillon, Annales ord. Sancti Benedicti. Ticinense. Lucae, 1739.
- Louis Moreri, Le Gran Dictionnaire Historique, Paris, 1743–1749.
- Gabriele, Matthew (2018). "The Provenance of the Descriptio Qauliter Karolus Magnus: Remembering the Carolingians in the entourage of King Philip I (1060–1108) before the First Crusade". Viator. 39 (2). University of California Press: 93-117.
