= Pepin II, Count of Vermandois =

Frankish noble

Pepin II

Count of Vermandois
- Reign: 850–893
- Predecessor: Pepin I
- Successor: Herbert I of Vermandois

Count of Valois
- Reign: 877–886 (as a Lordship); 886–893 (as a County)
- Predecessor: position established
- Successor: Herbert I

Count of Senlis
- Predecessor: Pepin I
- Successor: Pepin III
- Born: 845
- Died: 893
- Issue: Pepin III
- Dynasty: Carolingian (Herbertine Branch)
- Father: Pepin I

Pepin II (845–893) was a Frankish count. He was a son of Pepin, Count of Vermandois and Senlis, and a grandson of Bernard of Italy, who was himself a grandson of Charlemagne. He was the Count of Senlis and Count of Vermandois (850–893); Lord of Valois (877–886), and later Count of Valois (886–893). The brothers of Pepin II were Herbert I, Count of Vermandois and Bernard II, Count of Laon.

Pepin II of Vermandois's wife's name and origin are unknown; their son was:

- Pepin III of Senlis (876–922), Count of Senlis.
