= Elisabeth, Countess of Vermandois =

Elisabeth
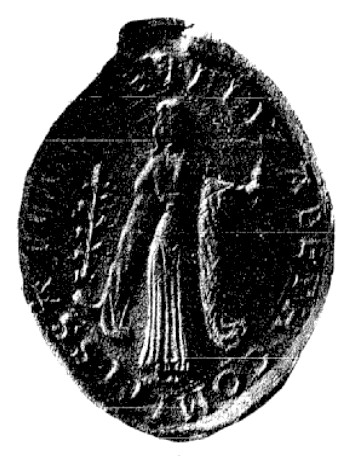

Countess of Vermandois and Valois
- Reign: 1168–1182
- Predecessor: Ralph II
- Successor: Eleanor
- Born: 1143
- Died: 28 March 1183; Arras, France
- Spouse: Philip I, Count of Flanders
- House: Capetian House of Vermandois
- Father: Ralph I
- Mother: Petronilla of Aquitaine

Elisabeth (French: Élisabeth), also known as Isabelle Mabille (1143 – 28 March 1183), was ruling Countess of Vermandois from 1168 to 1183, and also Countess of Flanders by marriage to Philip I, Count of Flanders. She was the eldest daughter of Ralph I, Count of Vermandois and his second spouse, Petronilla of Aquitaine.

== Life ==
Elisabeth was the daughter of Count Ralph I of Vermandois and Petronilla of Aquitaine. Her father was a high-ranking noble closely tied to the French king. Her mother was the younger sister of Eleanor of Aquitaine, the Queen of France (r. 1137–1152) and then of England (r. 1152–1189). This made Elisabeth first cousin to both Richard I of England and John of England. Ralph had divorced his first wife, Eleonore. However, his marriage to Petronilla had been viewed as illegitimate by Pope Innocent II, the marriage was later legitimized by Pope Celestine II thus allowing Isabelle Mabile to possibly inherit.

== Marriage ==
Map of France from 1180, Vermandois is in the North East

On 14 October 1152, Elisabeth's father died, and her brother Ralph was made Count of Vermandois. In 1159, Elisabeth married Philip I, Count of Flanders. Elisabeth’s dowry included land in Amiens, making her marriage politically valuable. Gislebert of Mons describes noble rule in the twelfth century as a territorial authority that depended heavily on dynastic marriage and inheritance claims. This helped explain Elisabeth’s political importance as Countess of Vermandois. As reflected in chronicles such as the Chronicle of Gislebert of Mons, political authority in the twelfth century was closely connected to hereditary claims, marriage alliances, and the consolidation of territories through inheritance. The following year, Elisabeth's brother Ralph married Philip's sister Margaret. In the same year, Hugh abdicated from his position as count to become a monk; therefore, Ralph succeeded as count, Elisabeth was then promoted to first in line, and her sister Eleonore was second. The sisters stayed closely associated to siblings and relatives: they supported each other politically, and their marriages linked multiple powerful regions.

== Rule ==
In 1167, Elisabeth's brother Ralph died of leprosy. As his marriage to Margaret had proved childless, Elisabeth inherited the County of Vermandois, which she ruled over jointly with her husband; this pushed Flemish authority further south, to its greatest extent thus far, and threatened to completely alter the balance of power in northern France.

When Elisabeth first became a countess, she was very young. Her mother-in-law, Countess Sybilla, was still active and powerful. Early on, Elisabeth mostly observed and learned, and appeared in documents as “wife of the count.” At the beginning of her rule, she had a more symbolic role rather than a governing one, but her authority developed gradually. Around age 16, Elisabeth became more active in ruling. She received her own lands, began appearing in official documents, and took part in political negotiations, religious patronage, and local governance. This shifted her role from simply a wife to a countess, an active political figure. Elisabeth’s responsibilities included supporting monasteries and churches, confirming land ownership and rights, enforcing authority over towns and officials, and participating in diplomacy.

During the height of her power, Elisabeth and her sister Eleanor supported a rebellion against Henry II. While their husbands were away fighting, they governed their territories themselves and worked with officials and local leaders to maintain control. According to historian Heather Tanner, as lords, Elisabeth and Eleanor provided justice, collected taxes, endowed religious houses, confirmed gifts, and regulated towns. After the rebellion, when her husband had returned, Elisabeth helped maintain alliances and political stability. She is recorded as participating in helping arrange important marriages to strengthen power networks. She also governed during her husband’s absence during the crusades. Elisabeth ruled alone with administrative support. She settled disputes, managed land, and issued official decisions. When her husband returned, they ruled together as partners.

However, Philip and Elisabeth were childless. In 1175, Philip discovered that Elisabeth was supposedly committing adultery with her lover, Walter de Fontaines. De nugis curialium, a 12th-century collection of written works by Walter Map, discusses adultery and its consequences on men. He writes that even great rulers can be morally destroyed because of women and sexual temptation. Because of this, Phillip had Walter beaten to death. Philip then obtained complete control of her lands in Vermandois from King Louis VII of France. In 1177, when Philip left for the Holy Land, he designated his sister Margaret and her second husband, Baldwin V, Count of Hainaut, as his heirs.

Elisabeth died at Arras on 28 March 1183 aged thirty-nine or forty, prompting King Philip II of France to seize Vermandois on behalf of her sister, Eleonore, who succeeded her. Elisabeth was buried at Amiens Cathedral.

== Sources ==
- Shortell, Ellen M. (2012). "Erasures and Recoveries of Women's Contributions to Gothic Architecture: The Case of Saint-Quentin, Local Nobility, and Eleanor of Vermandois". In Martin, Therese (ed.). Reassessing the Roles of Women as 'Makers' of Medieval Art and Architecture. Brill. pp. 129–174. ISBN 9789004228320.

Preceded by Ralph	Countess of Vermandois with Philip; 1168–1182	Succeeded by Eleanor disputed by Philip
Preceded by Ralph II	Countess of Valois with Philip; 1168-1182	Succeeded by Eleanor disputed by Philip
