= Saint-Crépin =

Saint-Crépin may refer to the following places in France:

- Saint-Crépin, Hautes-Alpes, a commune in the department of Hautes-Alpes
- Saint-Crépin, Charente-Maritime, a commune in the department of Charente-Maritime
- Saint-Crépin-aux-Bois, a commune in the department of Oise
- Saint-Crépin-d'Auberoche, a commune in the department of Dordogne
- Saint-Crépin-de-Richemont, a commune in the department of Dordogne
- Saint-Crépin-et-Carlucet, a commune in the department of Dordogne
- Saint-Crépin-Ibouvillers, a commune in the department of Oise
- Saint-Crespin-sur-Moine, (say "Saint-Crépin" too) a commune in département of Maine-et-Loire
