= Ralph I of Vermandois =

French noble and Count

Ralph I
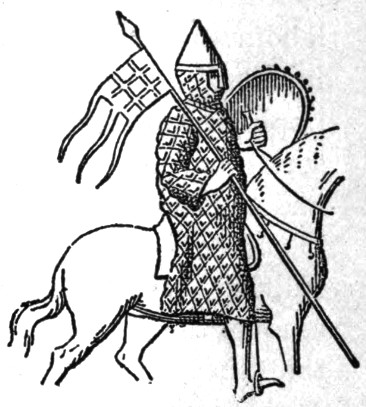
- Image of Ralph taken from his seal

Count of Vermandois and Valois
- Reign: 1102–1152
- Predecessor: Adelaide and Hugh I
- Successor: Ralph II
- Died: 14 October 1152
- Spouses: Eleanor of Champagne; Petronilla of Aquitaine; Laurette of Flanders
- Issue: Elisabeth, Countess of Vermandois Ralph II, Count of Vermandois Eleanor, Countess of Vermandois
- House: Capet
- Father: Hugh I
- Mother: Adelaide

Ralph I (French: Raoul I^{er}) (d. 14 October 1152) was the count of Vermandois from 1102 to 1152. He was a son of Count Hugh and Countess Adelaide. Ralph was a grandson of King Henry I of France on his father's side and of Herbert IV of Vermandois on his mother's.

Ralph served as the seneschal of France during the reign of his cousin King Louis VI. Under pressure from the queen, Eleanor of Aquitaine, Louis allowed Ralph to repudiate his wife, Eleanor, sister of Count Theobald II of Champagne, in favor of the queen's sister, Petronilla. This led to a war with Theobald, which lasted two years (1142–44) and ended with the occupation of Champagne by the royal army.

Ralph and Petronilla were excommunicated by Pope Innocent II for a marriage deemed illegitimate, overriding three bishops who had already annulled Ralph's prior marriage. With Eleanor's death in 1147, the following year Pope Eugene III, legitimized the marriage at the Council of Reims.

== Family and children ==
Ralph was married three times:

1. in 1125 to Eleanor, daughter of Stephen, Count of Blois. Their marriage ended in divorce in 1140 and she died in 1147.

2. in 1140 to Petronilla of Aquitaine; they had three children, each of whom would eventually marry a child of Count Thierry of Flanders:

- Elizabeth (or Isabelle) Mabile, countess of Vermandois and Valois (1143–1183), married Philip I, Count of Flanders; no issue.
- Ralph II, count of Vermandois and Valois (1145–1167), was the first husband of Margaret of Lorraine, who later became suo jure countess of Flanders. He died of leprosy in 1167 without issue.
- Eleanor, countess of Vermandois and Valois (b. 1148? – d. 1213/1214). She married four times as follows, but had no issue:
  - 1. Godfrey of Hainaut, Count of Ostervant (d. 1163).
  - 2. before 1167 William IV, Count of Nevers.
  - 3. ca 1170 Matthew of Alsace.
  - 4. ca 1175 Count Matthew III of Beaumont-sur-Oise.

3. in 1152 with Laurette of Flanders, daughter of Thierry, Count of Flanders and Swanhilde. They had no children.

== Sources ==
- Baldwin, John W. (1986). The Government of Philip Augustus: Foundations of French Royal Power in the Middle Ages. University of California Press.
- Bardot, Michael L.; Marvin, Laurence W., eds. (2018). Louis VII and his World. Brill.
- Bradbury, Jim (2007). The Capetians: Kings of France 987-1328. Hambledon Continuum.
- Duval-Arnould, Louis (1984). "Les dernières années du comte lépreux Raoul de Vermandois (v. 1147–1167...) et la dévolution de ses provinces à Philippe d'Alsace". Bibliothèque de l'École des chartes (in French). 142–1.
- Dyggve, Holger Petersen (1935). "Personnages historiques figurant dans la poésie lyrique française des XII e et XIII e siècles. III: Les dames du »Tournoiement» de Huon d'Oisi". Neuphilologische Mitteilungen (in French). 36 (2): 65–91.
- Gislebertus (of Mons) (2005). Chronicle of Hainaut. The Boydell Press.
- Livingstone, Amy (2018). "Revealing the Extraordinary: The Lives of Unremarkable Men in the Age of Louis VII". In Bardot, Michael L.; Marvin, Laurence W. (eds.). Louis VII and His World. Brill.
- Stewart, Gregory (1979). "The Twelfth Century Psalter Commentary in French for Laurette d'Alsace". In Lourdaux, W.; Verhelst, D. (eds.). The Bible and Medieval Culture. Leuven University Press.

Preceded by Adelaide and Hugh	Count of Vermandois; 1102–1152	Succeeded by Ralph II
Preceded by Hugh I	Count of Valois; 1102-1152	Succeeded by Ralph II
