= Pepin I of Vermandois =

Count of Vermandois (c. 817–850)

Count of Vermandois
- Predecessor: unknown, likely Hugh, son of C.M or perhaps Bernard of Italy
- Successor: Pepin II
- Born: c. 817
- Died: c. 850
- Issue: Richilde, Countess of Orléans; Bernard II; Pepin II; Herbert I, Count of Vermandois; Cunigundis
- House: Carolingian
- Father: Bernard of Italy
- Mother: Cunigunda of Laon

Pepin I (French: Pépin; c. 817 – c. 850) was Count of Vermandois, Lord of Senlis, Péronne and Saint Quentin. He was son of King Bernard of Italy (a grandson of Charlemagne) and his wife, Cunigunda of Laon. He supported King Lothair after the death of Emperor Louis the Pious, despite having sworn allegiance to Charles the Bald.

Pepin’s wife is unknown; their children were:

- Richilde of Vermandois, married William, Count of Orléans (c. 830 - 866).
- Bernard II, Count of Laon (c. 845 - before 893), Count of Laon from 877/878 until his death.
- Pepin II, Count of Vermandois (c. 846 - 893), Count of Vermandois from 850 until his death.
- Herbert I, Count of Vermandois (848/850 - 907), Count of Vermandois from 893 until his assassination.
- Cunigundis
