= Petronilla of Aquitaine =

French noble

- Countess of Vermandois
- Born: c. 1125; Poitiers
- Died: c. 1151; Saint-Quentin
- Burial: Crépy-en-Valois
- Spouse: Ralph I, Count of Vermandois
- Issue: Elisabeth, Countess of Vermandois; Ralph II, Count of Vermandois; Eleanor, Countess of Vermandois
- House: Ramnulfids
- Father: William X, Duke of Aquitaine
- Mother: Aénor de Châtellerault

Petronilla of Aquitaine (c. 1125 – c. 1151) was a French noble. She was the second daughter of William X of Aquitaine and Aénor of Châtellerault. She was the elder sister of William Aigret and the younger sister of Eleanor of Aquitaine, who was Queen consort of France, later England. She is variously called Alix (or Aelith in Occitan) and Petronilla; she typically went by Alix after her marriage, while Petronilla seems to have been her childhood name (she is referred to as such in her father's will).

== Life ==
Petronilla accompanied her sister to the French court, where she met Ralph I, Count of Vermandois, who was a married man and a cousin to her brother-in-law Louis VII of France. He repudiated his wife and married her, and they were excommunicated by Pope Innocent II in 1142. Hostilities broke out, and Louis VII infamously burned Vitry-en-Perthois in 1145. Pope Eugenius III renewed the excommunication in 1145, but eventually lifted it at the Council of Reims in 1148.

The exact date of Petronilla's death is unknown, although she must have died at some point between the Council of Reims in 1148 and 1152 when Raoul was married for a third time to Laure, daughter of Thierry of Alsace, count of Flanders. Petronilla was buried in the Cluniac priory of Saint-Arnoul in Crépy-en-Valois, where Raoul was later interred alongside her.

== Issue ==
Together Petronilla and Ralph had:

- Elisabeth, Countess of Vermandois also known as Isabelle Mabile (1143 – 28 March 1183), married Philip, Count of Flanders
- Ralph II, Count of Vermandois (1145–1167), married Margaret I, Countess of Flanders.
- Eleanor, Countess of Vermandois (1148/49 – 1213)

== Sources ==
- Gislebert of Mons (1904). Vanderkindere, L. (ed.). Chronicle of Hainaut. p. 70.
- Hosler, John D. (2018). "The War Councils and Military Advisers of Louis VII of France". In Bardot, Michael L.; Marvin, Laurence W. (eds.). Louis VII and His World. Brill. pp. 11–28. ISBN 9789004368002.
- John of Salisbury (1956). Chibnall, Marjorie (ed.). Historia Pontificalis. pp. 14–15.
- Shortell, Ellen M. (2012). "Erasures and Recoveries of Women's Contributions to Gothic Architecture: The Case of Saint-Quentin, Local Nobility, and Eleanor of Vermandois". In Martin, Therese (ed.). Reassessing the Roles of Women as 'Makers' of Medieval Art and Architecture. Brill. pp. 129–174. ISBN 9789004228320.
- Swabey, Ffiona (2004). Eleanor of Aquitaine, Courtly Love, and the Troubadours. Greenwood Publishing Group. pp. 34. ISBN 978-0-313-32523-6.
- Van Kerrebrouck, Patrick (2000). Les Capetiens, 987-1328.
