= County of Amiens =

Medieval feudal state centred on Amiens, France

Coordinates: 49.90°N 2.30°E

County of Amiens Comte de Amiens (French)
- 9th Century–1185
- Status: Vassal State of France; (9th Century-1077); Crown Land of France; (1077-1185)
- Capital: Amiens
- Common languages: Old French; Picard
- Religion: Catholicism
- Government: County
- Count of Amiens
- Historical era: Middle Ages
  - Established: 9th Century
  - County reverts to French crown: 1077
  - United with the French crown: 1185
Preceded by	Succeeded by
West Francia	Kingdom of France
- Today part of: Somme Department

The County of Amiens (also: Amiénois) was a feudal state centred on the city of Amiens, northern France, that existed from the 9th century until 1077 when the last count became a monk and the county reverted to the French crown. In 1185 the county was united with the French crown under King Philip II of France.

== List of counts of Amiens ==
- Richard (801-825) ancestor of the House of Buvinids
- Ermenfroi (before 895–919) also count of Vexin and Valois
- Ralph I of Gouy (915-926), also probably Count of Ostervant, from 923 also count of Valois and Vexin, possibly brother-in-law or son-in-law of Ermenfroi (first house of Valois)
- Ralph II of Vexin (Raoul de Cambrai) (926-944), Count of Valois, Amiens and Vexin, son of Ralph I.
- Odo of Vermandois (941-944), son of Count Herbert II of Vermandois, usurped the county in 941, ejected by royal troops in 944.
- Herluin (941-944), Count of Ponthieu (House of Montreuil)
- Walter I of Vexin (945-after 992), from 965 Count of Valois, Amiens and Vexin, probably son of Ralph I.
- Walter II of Vexin Le Blanc (before 998-after 1017), Count of Valois, Amiens and Vexin, from 1017 Count of Mantes, son of Walter I.
- Drogo (after 1017–1035), Count of Amiens, Mantes, Pontoise and Vexin, son of Walter II.
- Walter III (1035-1063), count of Amiens and Vexin, from 1063 titular count of Maine, son of Drogo
- Ralph IV (1063-1074) Count of Valois, Crépy and Vitry, from 1063 Count of Amiens and Vexin, avoué of five abbeys (Saint-Denis, Jumièges, Saint-Wandrille, Saint-Pierre in Chartres and Saint-Arnoul in Crépy), son of Ralph III.
- Simon (1074-1077), died in 1080, Count of Amiens, Valois, Montdidier, Bar-sur-Aube, Vitry and Vexin, son of Ralph IV.

In 1077 Simon became a monk and his possessions were distributed. Valois went to his brother-in-law Herbert IV, Count of Vermandois, Amiens reverted to the French king Philip I while Vexin was divided between William, Duke of Normandy, and the king of France. Bar-sur-Aube and Vitry were occupied by Theobald, Count of Blois.

== House of Boves ==
- Enguerrand I (1085-1118), lord of Boves, Coucy and la Fère
- Thomas (1116-1118), died before 1131, his son, lord of Coucy, Marle, la Fère and Boves

== Capetian House of Vermandois ==
- Ralph I le Vaillant (1102–1152), Count of Valois, Vermandois, Amiens and Crépy, Seneschal of France (1131–1152), Regent of France in 1147

== Bibliography ==
- Baldwin, John W. (1986). The Government of Philip Augustus: Foundations of French Royal Power in the Middle Ages. University of California Press.
