= Ralph IV of Valois =

French nobleman (1025–1074)

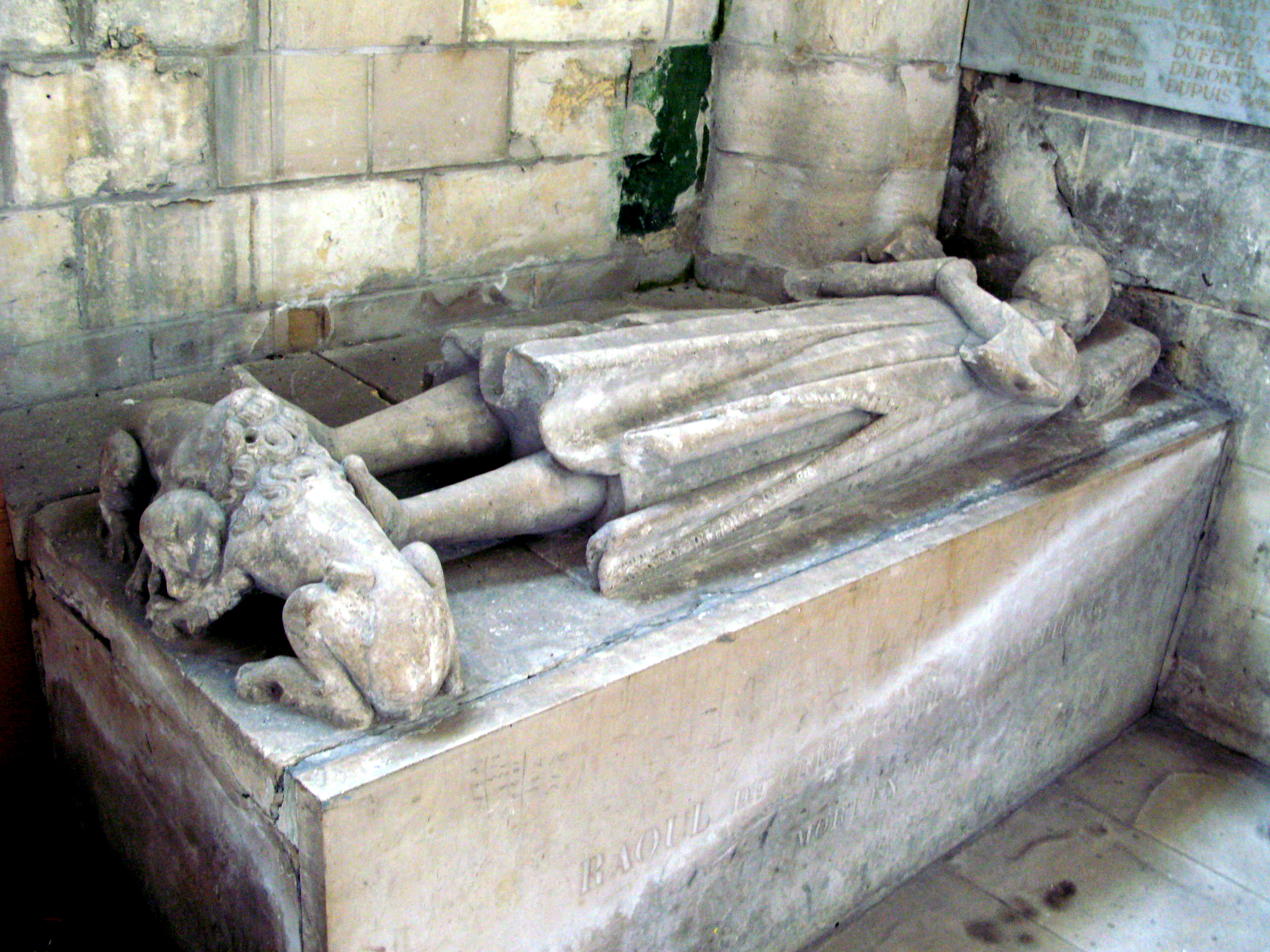
Tomb of Ralph IV in the church of Saint-Pierre in Montdidier. His body was later moved to Crépy.

Ralph IV (French: Raoul; born c. 1025, died 1074) was a northern French nobleman who amassed an extensive array of lordships lying in a crescent around the Île-de-France from the border of the Duchy of Normandy in the northwest to Champagne in the southeast.

Ralph was the count of seven counties: Valois (Crépy) from 1037/8, Bar-sur-Aube and Vitry from the 1040s, Montdidier from 1054, Vexin (Mantes) and Amiens from 1063 and Tardenois from an unknown date. He held suzerainty over a further seven counties: Corbie, Dammartin, Meulan, Montfort, Péronne, Soissons and Vermandois. In addition, he was the advocatus (defender) of five abbeys: Saint-Denis, Jumièges, Saint-Wandrille, Saint-Père-en-Vallée and Saint-Arnoul.

Initially an enemy of the reigning Capetian dynasty, Ralph became a staunch royal ally after 1041. He was one of the royal domain's most powerful neighbours. The historian John Cowdrey likens Ralph's lands to a "clamp ... set upon the northern part of the Capetian demesne". After the death of King Henry I in 1060, Ralph married the king's widow, Queen Anna Yaroslavna. He thus became an important advisor to the young king, Philip I, until his death. Guibert of Nogent, a contemporary of Ralph, wrote, "How great he was can also be gathered from the single fact that he married the mother of King Philip after the death of her husband."

== Name and number ==
Given the multiplicity of titles he held, the popularity of his name within his family and the fact that all contemporary references to him are in Latin, how to refer to Ralph in modern English (or French) can pose a problem. In the seventeenth century, the Sieur du Cange, followed a century later by Claude Carlier and most recently by Louis Carolus-Barré, argued that Raoul de Gouy (died 926) was never Count of Valois and re-numbered the succeeding counts named Ralph. This converted Ralph IV and his father into Ralph III and Ralph II, respectively. In older literature, he is sometimes called "Ralph the Great".

Contemporary chroniclers generally referred to him as Ralph of Crépy, while modern scholars have tended to prefer Ralph of Valois. The English historian Orderic Vitalis, writing in Normandy, called him Ralph of Montdidier (Rodulfo de Monte Desiderii) and Ralph, count of Mantes (Radulfum comitem Medantensium), spelling his first name differently each time. He signed a royal document of 27 May 1067 as "Rodulf, count of Crépy" (Rodulfi comitis Crispiniacensis). The spellings "Radulf" and "Rodulf", although derived from Germanic names with originally different meanings, both have a basis in contemporary sources.

== Early life ==
Map of France, c. 1030 Ralph's counties of Vexin, Valois, Amiens, Bar and Vitry are shown.

Born around 1025, Ralph was the eldest son of Count Ralph III of Valois and Alix of Breteuil. His father died in 1037 or 1038 and Ralph succeeded to the county of Valois, with its seat at Crépy. The castle of Crépy was divided between Ralph and his younger brother Theobald, who inherited their mother's fief of Nanteuil-le-Haudouin. At Crépy, Ralph received the living quarters and the outbuildings, while the donjon went to Theobald. The castle was thus a kind of condominium between the brothers.

Ralph's father had been a supporter of Count Odo II of Blois against King Henry I. After Odo's death in 1037, Ralph continued to support Odo's two sons, counts Theobald III of Blois and Stephen II of Troyes. He took advantage of the fighting in the Beauvaisis, however, to break free from his inherited vassalage to the count of Troyes. In 1041, while fighting on behalf of Odo's sons in an effort to depose the king, Ralph was captured by royal forces. Thereafter, he was the king's man and an opponent of the Blois–Troyes family. He tried to prevent Theobald from annexing the lands of his nephew, Odo III, after the latter moved to England in 1066.

== First marriage and children ==
In the 1040s, while en route to Rome, Ralph met his recently widowed cousin, Adela (Adelaide, Latin Adelhais), countess of Bar-sur-Aube and Vitry-en-Perthois since the death of her father, Nocher III, in 1040. Bar-sur-Aube was a fief of the count of Troyes. Having secured a promise of marriage, Ralph continued his pilgrimage to Rome. Upon his return he found that Adela's vassals, fearing his authority, had attempted to marry her to Renard, count of Joigny. Ralph immediately began pillaging Joigny until Adela was returned to him. Ralph and Adela had four children:

- Walter (died 1065/72), who succeeded in Bar-sur-Aube and Vitry
- Simon (died 1080), who succeeded in Valois, Vexin, Amiens, Montdidier and Tardenois
- Elisabeth, who married Barthélemy, lord of Broyes and Beaufort
- Adela, who married, firstly, Count Herbert IV of Vermandois, and secondly, Count Theobald III of Blois

== Second marriage and excommunication ==
In 1053 or 1054, Adela died. By 1060, Ralph had married a woman nicknamed or surnamed Haquenez, and possibly named Eleanor.

Haquenez has been called the heiress of the county of Montdidier and suzerain over the county of Péronne, but there is no proof of this. Her parentage is unknown. If she brought Ralph a claim to Montdidier, their marriage must have taken place no later than 1054, since he was in control of Montdidier in that year. Ralph did not relinquish his control over the counties of Montdidier and Péronne after repudiating Haquenez in 1060 or 1061. The wording of Guibert of Nogent concerning the succession at Montdidier after Ralph's death has been taken as evidence that Ralph merely seized Montdidier and ruled it by right of conquest: "the castle in which the site of his burial he had prepared", that is, Montdidier, "he had stolen from its possessors and held as his own" and "in that castle, which came to Simon [his son] by use rather than by [rightful] inheritance, the remains of his father came to rest." If this is correct, then he may have seized Montdidier any time between 1033 and 1054. Its rightful ruler was Hilduin IV, who continued to use the title of count—but not Count of Montdidier—until his death in 1063.

Ralph later accused his second wife of adultery and repudiated her. In 1061 or 1062, he married the princess Anna Yaroslavna of Kievan Rus', the widow of King Henry I and mother of the reigning king, Philip I. Haquenez appealed to Gervase, archbishop of Reims, who wrote to Pope Alexander II explaining the situation. According to the archbishop, "the marriage of our queen to Count Ralph (Comiti Radulpho) grieves our king most of all" (rex noster ... maxime dolet). Haquenez then went to Rome to appeal to the pope in person.

The pope's response, addressed to Gervase, his suffragans and to the unnamed archbishop of Sens, was brought back to France by Haquenez. She had apparently reported to the pope that Ralph had stolen everything she owned (by which she perhaps meant the counties), and the pope instructed Gervase and the archbishop of Sens to open an investigation and preside as judges. The purpose of the inquiry was to return Haquenez's property to her and clear her name of the false accusation of adultery. In the end, Ralph was excommunicated from the church. In March 1062, Mainard, archbishop of Sens, died and by April he had been succeeded by Richer. It is possible that Alexander did not name the archbishop because the letter was drafted in the interim, when the name of the new archbishop was not yet known in Rome.

== Third marriage and co-regency ==
The Chronicle of the abbey of Saint-Pierre-le-Vif records the death of Henry and the re-marriage of Anna in the same sentence, fuelling speculation that the queen and Ralph had been involved in a love affair. In fact, Henry's death came in 1060, a year or two before Anna's second marriage. There is no hint in any contemporary source that the queen and Ralph were involved before their marriage. Nor is there any evidence that she was abducted or otherwise forced into marriage.

At the time of her marriage to Ralph, Anna was about thirty years old. Since Philip, the eldest of her four children with Henry, was not yet of age, she has been accused by modern historians of abandoning her children. Contemporaries made no such charge. Ralph, however, was accused of bigamy, since his repudiation of Haquenez had been illegal under both civil and ecclesiastical law, and consanguinity, since he was related to the Capetian house within the prohibited degree. As a result it seems, Ralph and Anna did not attend the French court regularly again until 1065, although she continued to be acknowledged as co-regent with Count Baldwin V of Flanders. The marriage had at least three advantages for Ralph: it brought him a dowry that included an abbey at Laon, it brought him influence at court and it brought him enhanced prestige because of Anna's high rank and even "exoticism".

Ralph was, however, "Baldwin's greatest rival in north-eastern France and a potential threat to his influence over the young king." This may explain why at least one later source, the Annales sancti Benigni Divonensis, the chronicle of the cathedral of Dijon, claims that Philip's younger brother Hugh acted as his "coadjutor". Keeping Hugh close prevented any split in the royal family. After the reconciliation of Philip and his mother, Ralph was the second most important counsellor to the king after Baldwin. He is cited as a witness in thirty royal diplomas, and is explicitly called a counsellor of the royal court in one of 1062. In 1065, Ralph and Anna were with Philip as the royal court visited Soissons, Orléans, Laon and Corbie. In 1067, Philip paid a visit to Amiens, which lay in Ralph's county. In 1069, Ralph was calling himself the king's step-father.

== Private wars ==
Ralph is mentioned in the Vita nobilissimi comitis Girardi de Rossellon, a Latin hagiography of Count Gerard II of Paris, written shortly after 1100 and preserved in one 13th-century manuscript. A 13th-century Old French translation, the Vie de Girart de Rossillon, is also preserved. The Vita records that Ralph plundered the abbey of Saint-Pierre-et-Saint-Paul de Pothières from his county of Bar-sur-Aube:

Comes Rodulfus Barrensis castri super Albam siti, adunata gravi multitudine predonum equestrium ac pedestrium Pulteriense cenobium atrociter aggrediens, depopulari nitebatur. . .

Raoux, qui estoit cuens de Bar le Chastel assis sur Aube, assembla grant multitude de preors a cheval et a pié, et anvaïst cruelment l'abbaïe de Pouteres, et s'esforçoit qu'ele fust destruite. . .

Ralph, who was count of the castle of Bar on the Aube, gathered a great number of robbers, both cavalry and infantry, to cruelly attack the monastery of Pothières and lay it waste. . .

According to the Vita, the nuns then cried out to Gerard, the founder of Pothières and who was buried there. The saint then sent a demon to torment two of Ralph's men and the rest fled in fear. Although much of the material, including the protagonist's byname ("de Roussillon"), is legendary, Ferdinand Lot believes that the episode concerning Ralph is based on an actual event.

In 1065/66, Ralph supported Count Manasses III of Rethel in his war against Bishop Theoderic of Verdun in the Holy Roman Empire. According to late sources, in or before 1071, Ralph attacked his son-in-law, Count Herbert IV of Vermandois, and seized Péronne, to which he had a claim from his second marriage. The historicity of this little war has been called into question.

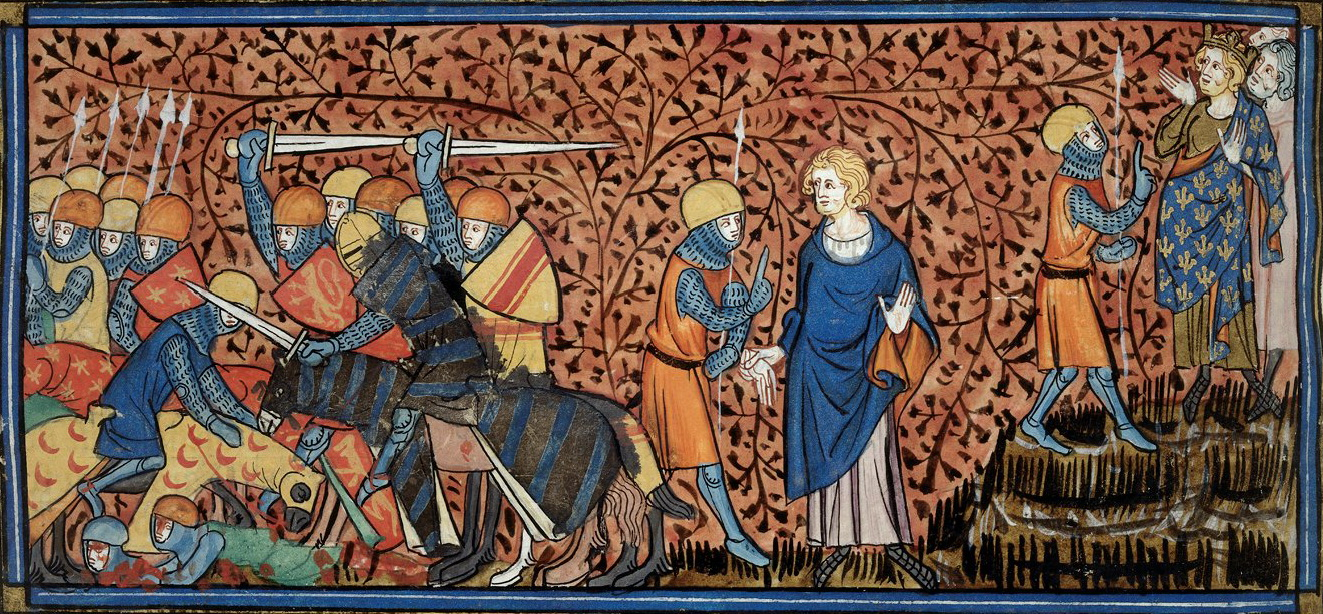
A 14th-century illustration of the battle of Mortemer (1054), where Ralph was present on the French side

== Relations with Normandy ==
In the 1050s, Ralph supported King Henry against Duke William II of Normandy. He was present on the king's side at the battle of Mortemer in February 1054, when the Normans routed the royal army. Ralph himself escaped the slaughter and took shelter in the castle of Mortemer. According to Orderic Vitalis, writing about 75 years later, Ralph was aided in his escape by one of the Norman commanders, Roger, castellan of Mortemer, "on account of the fealty he [Roger] had formerly sworn to him [Ralph]." After entertaining Ralph as his guest for three days, Roger escorted him back to his own lands. For this Roger was banished, but soon reconciled, although the castle of Mortemer was never restored to him.

The reason for the oath of fealty is not explained in any primary source. Roger's wife, Hadewisa, however, had inherited the villa of Mers at the mouth of the Bresle, which lay within the diocese of Amiens and may have been under Ralph's suzerainty. The 19th-century historian J. R. Planché has even suggested that Hadewisa was Ralph's daughter.

In 1058, Ralph was with King Henry's army at the siege of Thimert.

In 1063, Ralph's cousin, Walter III of Vexin, died and Ralph inherited the counties of Vexin, with its seat at Mantes, and Amiens. Sometime between 1061 and 1066, Duke William entrusted Hugh de Grandmesnil with the castle of Neuf-Marché, possibly to defend against Ralph after the latter's acquisition of Vexin. Ralph and Hugh fought several skirmishes, and on one occasion, outnumbered, Hugh's army was routed and forced to flee. Then, between 1063 and 1067, Maurilius, archbishop of Rouen, granted the lordship of Gisors, which he held from the duke in Normandy, to Ralph as a life lease. This may have been approved by the duke to assure Ralph's cooperation or non-interference with the upcoming English expedition. Gisors was not restored to Rouen until 1075.

Later, Ralph's relations with Normandy improved and he sent his son Simon to be brought up at William's court. After the Norman conquest of England in 1066, King William returned to Normandy with captives and booty. He held an Easter court at Fécamp on 8 April 1067 to display his spoils and Ralph was in attendance. Ralph then attended the Whitsun court of King Philip I of France in Paris, witnessing a royal charter on 27 May. In June or July, he was again at the king's court in Melun. On either of these occasions, he would have met Bishop Guy of Amiens, whose diocese lay within Ralph's lordship. Ralph, having been to William's celebratory court at Fécamp and having a son raised in the Norman household, was well-positioned to pass along information about the battle of Hastings to the bishop, who began work on his poem Carmen de Hastingae Proelio shortly after.

== King Philip's wars ==
Sometime between 1065 and 1072, probably towards 1069, Ralph and his eldest son, Walter, joined King Philip in an attack on Vitry. How Vitry had fallen into the hands of an enemy of the king and Ralph is unknown, nor is the identity of the enemy. In the campaign, Walter was killed, but Vitry was besieged and taken. William Busac, count of Soissons and Ralph's vassal, also took part in the war of Vitry. It is probable that Ralph had acquired the suzerainty of the county of Soissons about the same time he acquired that of Dammartin: on the death of his cousin Walter. Certainly in 1061 Count Odo of Dammartin and his son Hugh were vassals of Walter. At that time the count of Soissons was Renaud I, ruling jointly with his son Guy II. No document survives that explicitly identifies Renaud or Guy as vassals of Ralph.

Ralph participated on the king's side in the war of the Flemish succession in 1070–71. In 1067, the regent Count Baldwin died and was succeeded in Flanders by his eldest son, Baldwin VI, who was married to Richilde, the countess of Hainaut in the Holy Roman Empire. Baldwin VI died in 1070 and the succession was disputed. Richilde claimed Flanders for her young son by Baldwin, Arnulf III, while Baldwin's younger brother, Robert the Frisian, also claimed it. The king supported Richilde and Arnulf, and Ralph gave his support to the king. According to the Genealogia comitum Flandrensium, the men of Péronne, which Ralph had probably seized shortly before, were part of the king's army.

== Death and legacy ==
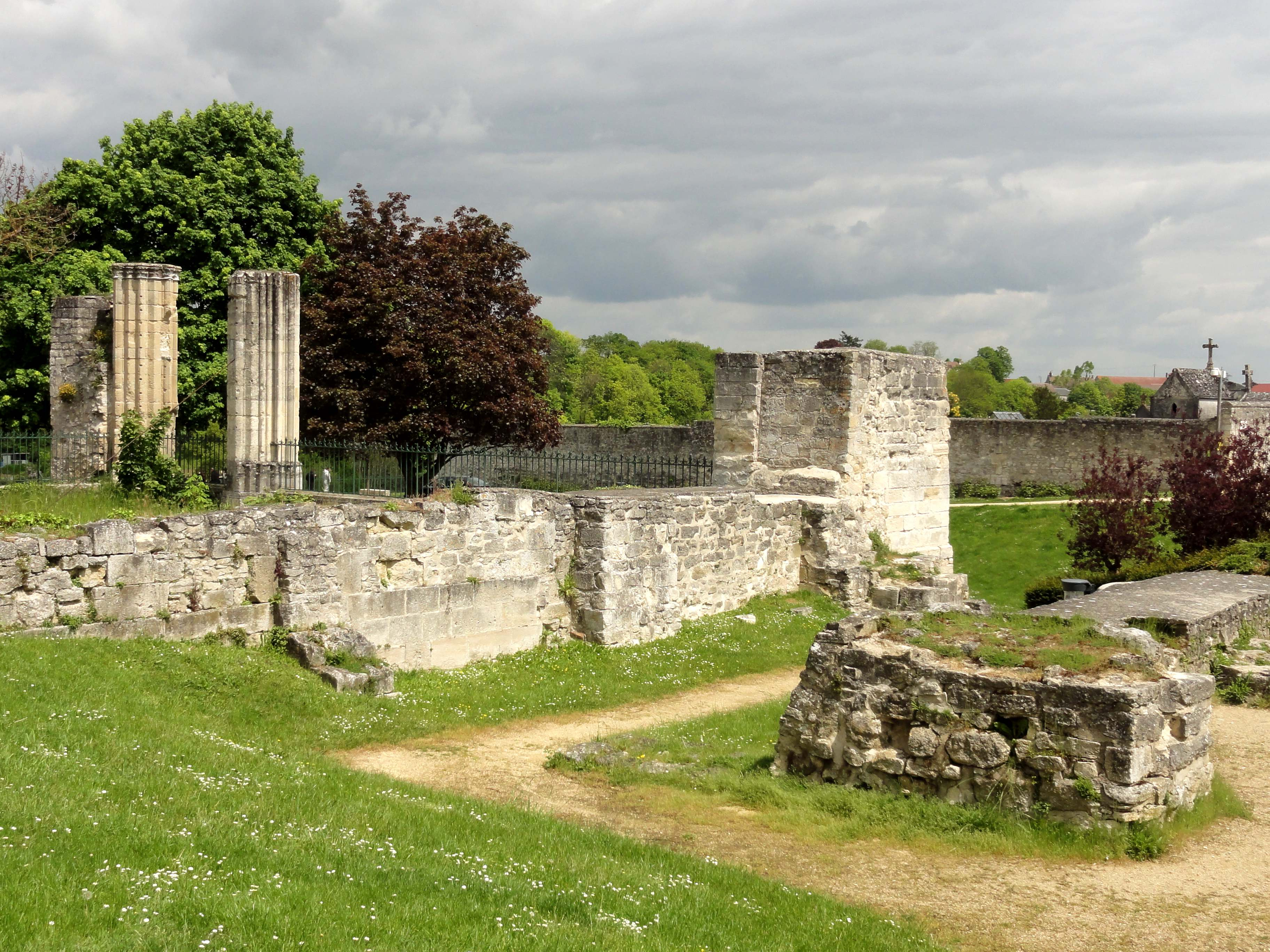
Ruins of Saint-Arnoul in Crépy, Ralph's final resting place

Ralph died, still excommunicated, in 1074 and was buried in the church of Saint-Pierre in Montdidier. Since Montdidier had rightfully belonged to Ralph's abandoned second wife, and the count of Vermandois also had a claim, Pope Gregory VII requested that his body be moved. His son Simon had it removed to the priory of Saint-Arnoul at Crépy. The sight of his father's decaying corpse is said to have motivated Simon to first contemplate the vanity of seeking after worldly glory. In 1077, he retired to become a monk at Saint-Oyend. The Vita beati Simoni comitis Crespeiensis (Life of Blessed Simon, Count of Crépy), a hagiography written by an anonymous monk of Saint-Oyend in the generation after Simon's death, is an important source for Ralph's life. Since Ralph's eldest son, Walter, had died before him, all his lands passed to Simon.

Ralph himself began his career with only one county owing homage to the count of Troyes and ended it with seven counties and a further seven owing homage to him. France was more stable in the eleventh century than the tenth, and in the first century of Capetian rule relatively fewer noblemen than in the previous century were successful at building up principalities by a combination of inheritance, marriage, usurpation and force. Jean Dunbabin argues there were only two such ephemeral principalities formed in the eleventh century: Ralph's northern principality and a southern one forged by the marriage of Robert II of Auvergne and Bertha of Rouergue in 1064/66. After Ralph's death, Robert II tried to arrange a marriage between his daughter Judith and Ralph's son, but the arrangements fell through when Simon became a monk and Judith a nun.

The breakup of Ralph's principality followed quickly on his death. His stepson Hugh claimed a part of his lands, sparking a war with Simon in which the king took part as Hugh's ally. In the end, "Ralph's budding principality", "the nearest approximation to a principality to emerge" in Picardy, was broken up. The crown acquired Vexin and the advocacies of Corbie and Saint-Denis, Amiens returned to the bishop and Simon granted his brother-in-law Herbert of Vermandois both Valois and Montdidier. These then passed on Herbert's death in 1080 to his daughter, Adelaide, who married Simon's step-brother Hugh, brother of the king. Much of the counties of Amiens and Valois had belonged to the county of Vermandois in the tenth century.

The monk Guibert of Nogent, whose father fought at Mortemer, wrote in the first quarter of the twelfth century that he had spoken to many who had known Ralph. According to the monk, "They can say to what degree he increased his power, what authority he acquired and what despotism he used. If he found a castle convenient to him, he besieged it. Site attacked, site taken: so great was his ability in the art of sieges. Of all the places he took, he never returned one. His birth gave him an illustrious rank among the great lords of the kingdom."
