= List of counts of the Vexin =

The county of the Vexin was a medieval French county that was later partitioned between the Vexin Français (French Vexin) and the Vexin Normand (Norman Vexin). The count of the Vexin was the ruler of said county.

== List of counts ==
=== Carolingian counts ===
- 753–764 Romuald, survivor of the Battle of Poitiers (732)
- in 790 Griffon
- 796 Riferus
- (date unknown) Regnauld
- about 851–864 Geilenus, count of Meulan

=== Nibelungs ===
- 864-after 879 Nibelung IV
- Theodoric I, his son
- 886 Adelram III and Theodoric II, defenders of Pontoise, nephews of Theodoric I

=== House of Valois-Vexin-Amiens ===
- c. 895 – 919 Ermenfroi, also count of Amiens and Valois
- 915–926 Ralph I d'Ostrevent, also count of Amiens and Valois, son-in-law of preceding
- 926–943 Ralph II, also count of Amiens and Valois, son of preceding
- 943 – after 992 Walter I, also count of Amiens and Valois, apparently brother of preceding
- c. 998 – after 1017 Walter II the White, also count of Amiens and Valois, son of preceding
- c. 1024 – 1035 Drogo, also count of Amiens, son of preceding
- 1035–1063 Walter III, also count of Amiens, Valois and Maine, son of preceding
- 1063–1074 Ralph IV, also count of Valois and Amiens, son of Ralph III of Valois and grandson of Walter II
- 1074–1077 Simon, also count of Valois and Amiens, he became a monk and his properties were dispersed, Vexin being partitioned between the Duke of Normandy and the King of France
- 1092–1108 Louis of France, son of king Philip I of France, made count of Vexin Français, later crowned king Louis VI of France

=== House of Bourbon ===
- 1673–1683 Louis-César de Bourbon (1673–1683), legitimized infant son of Louis XIV of France and Madame de Montespan
