= Walter III of the Vexin =

French count from 1035 to 1063

Walter III was a French Count of the Vexin, Amiens and Maine. He held Vexin from 1035 to 1063.

Walter was the son of Count Drogo of Vexin and Amiens and Godgifu, daughter of King Æthelred II of England.

He appeared in 1030 as a witness to a donation made by his father to the Abbey of Jumièges, and succeeded him in 1035. Walter continued the policy of his father, good relations with the Capetians and the Duchy of Normandy, but the breakdown of their relationship in 1052 called this policy into question. He first attempted neutrality between the two, but ended up joining the camp of King Henry I in 1057.

Walter married Biota, the daughter of Count Herbert I of Maine, but had no children.

His wife's nephew Count Herbert II of Maine, died in 1062, bequeathing Maine to Duke William of Normandy, but the lords of Maine refused him, revolted and chose Walter as Count, with the support of Count Geoffrey III of Anjou. Duke William began the conquest of Maine by taking the fortresses one by one and finally seizing Le Mans and capturing Walter and Biota. They were imprisoned in Falaise and died there under mysterious circumstances.

His death benefitted Duke William on two accounts, firstly he had removed the Count of Maine, and secondly, Walter was the last living child of Godgifu and thus a possible claimant to the English throne upon King Edward's death.

His cousin, Ralph IV of Valois, inherited the counties of Vexin and Amiens, with the exception of the towns of Pontoise and Chaumont-en-Vexin which the King of France had seized.
