= Nibelungids =

Family

The Nibelungids were a Frankish noble family descended from Childebrand, the younger full brother of Charles Martel.

They formed a cadet branch, alongside the Carolingians, of the Arnulfing−Pippinid house. The dynasty got its name from Childebrand's heir, Nibelung I ("The Historian").

Childebrand's immediate descendants held the County of the Vexin in the 9th century. The relationships between the various Childebrands and Nibelungs of the period are rarely attested in primary sources, leaving it to genealogists, prosopographers, and onomasticists to piece together possible lines of descent. It has been suggested that they were related to the family of William of Gellone and to the Counts of Autun, from which may have descended Ringard, the wife of Pepin II of Aquitaine.

The early Nibelungids were patrons of the continuation of the Chronicle of Fredegar, which is indicated in the Austrasian and Arnulfing emphasis in the continuation, as distinct from the Burgundian outlook of the original chronicle.

== See also ==
- Nibelung IV
