= Theobald III =

Theobald III may refer to:

- Theobald III of Blois (1012–1089)
- Theobald III, Count of Champagne (1179–1201)
