= Adele of Bar-sur-Aube =

French noblewoman

Adele
- Died: 1053; France
- Children: 4
- Parent: Nocher III of Bar-sur-Aube

Adele (French: Adèle; also Adela or Adélaïde/Aelis) (? — 1053) was a French noble lady and the countess suo jure of Bar-sur-Aube.

== Life ==
Lady Adele was a daughter of the count Nocher II of Bar-sur-Aube and his wife, whose name remains unknown. After the death of her father, Adele became a countess, since she was the eldest child of her parents. Her sister was named Isabella.

These are the husbands of lady Adele:

- Renaud of Semur
- Renard of Joigny
- Roger I of Vignory
- Ralph IV of Valois

Adele and her cousin Ralph IV—the son of Ralph III—were the parents of four children:

- Walter of Bar-sur-Aube
- Simon de Crépy
- Élisabeth
- Adele of Valois

De jure uxoris, Ralph was the count of Bar-sur-Aube. Adele was a grandmother of Adelaide, Countess of Vermandois. Simon donated property to the abbey of Molesme for the soul of Adele.

== Sources ==
- Bautier, Robert-Henri (1985). "Anne de Kiev, reine de France, et la politque royale au XI^{e} siècle: Étude critique de la documentation". Revue des études slaves. 57 (4): 539–564. doi:10.3406/slave.1985.5520.
- Locatelli, René (1992). Sur les chemins de la perfection: moines et chanoines dans le diocese Besancon, vers 1060-1220 (in French). Publications de l'Universite de Sainte-Etienne.

=== Primary sources ===
- Acta Sanctorum — a chronicle in which the marriages of Adele are mentioned
- Chronica Albrici Monachi Trium Fontium — by Alberic of Trois-Fontaines
