= Simon de Crépy =

Count of Amiens, of the Vexin and of Valois

- statue of Saint Simon in Mouthe
- Born: c. 1047; Bar-sur-Aube
- Died: c. 1082
- Feast: 30 September

Simon de Crépy (c. 1047 – 1081) was Count of Amiens, of the Vexin and of Valois from 1074 until 1077. He was the son of Count Ralph IV of Valois and Adèle of Bar-sur-Aube and thus the brother of Adele of Valois. He is also known as Simon de Vexin, Simon of Crépy and Saint Simon.

Simon was brought up at the court of William II of Normandy, and inherited his father's sizable lands in 1074. These lay between the royal domain of King Philip I of France and the lands of William of Normandy, by then King of England, and made Simon an important man. It is said that at this time William of Normandy proposed a marriage between Simon and his daughter Adela of Normandy. In the meantime, King Philip attempted to withhold part of Simon’s inheritance and a three-year-long war resulted.

A marriage with Adela was within the prohibited degree of consanguinity and Simon went to Rome to meet with Pope Gregory VII, perhaps to arrange a dispensation. Whether this was his motive, the Pope arranged a truce between Simon and King Philip. Perhaps as part of the papal settlement, Simon married a daughter of the Count of Auvergne (chronologically, this would have been either William V or Robert II) about 1075.

Shortly afterwards Simon and his wife both took religious vows and entered monasteries. His county of Valois passed to his sister's husband, Herbert IV, Count of Vermandois, Amiens to Philip, and the Vexin was partitioned between Philip and William, creating the modern division between the Vexin français and the Vexin normand.

Simon was not content with the relatively luxurious surrounds of the Abbey of Saint-Claude, and decided upon a life as a hermit in the forests of Burgundy on the upper reaches of the river Doubs. There he and a few colleagues constructed cabins and cleared land to farm. This priory remained dependent upon Sainte-Claude until the 12th century, then upon Saint-Oyen de Joux. The village of Mouthe later grew up around the priory.

Simon undertook a pilgrimage to the Holy Land, and then again to Rome where he died. He received the Last Rites from Gregory VII. Simon was later beatified and his relics are still kept at Mouthe where a statue in his honour was erected in 1934.

== Sources ==
- Bury, J. B., The Cambridge Medieval History, Volume III: Germany and the Western Empire, Cambridge University Press, London, 1922, pg. 111
- Cowdrey, H. E. J., Count Simon of Crepy's Monastic Conversion. The Crusades and Latin Monasticism, 11th–12th Centuries, Ashgate Publishing, Brookfield, VT, 1999
