= Counts and dukes of Valois =

Nobles in northern France

Coat of arms of the counts and dukes of Valois.

The Valois (UK: /ˈvælwɑː/ VAL-wah, also US: /vælˈwɑː, vɑːlˈwɑː/ va(h)l-WAH, French: [valwa]; originally Pagus Valensis) was a region in the valley of the Oise river in Picardy in the north of France. It was a fief in West Francia and subsequently the Kingdom of France until its counts furnished a line of kings, the House of Valois, to succeed the House of Capet in 1328. It was, along with the counties of Beauvais, the Vexin, Vermandois, and Laon, part of the "Oise line" of fiefdoms which were held often by one individual or an individual family as a string of defences against Viking assault on Paris.

The medieval county and duchy of Valois was located in northern France. It was included in the northeastern part of the government of Île-de-France, while being part of the province of Picardy. Its capital was Crépy-en-Valois.

== Counts of Valois ==
=== Carolingian counts ===
- Pepin I, Count of Vermandois and Valois, son of Bernard, King of Italy.
- ca. 886–893 Pepin II – son of previous, count of Vermandois and Valois.
- ca. 893–895 Herbert I, Count of Vermandois – brother of previous, count of Vermandois.

=== Counts of disputed origin ===
- about 895–919 Ermenfroi, also count of Amiens and the Vexin
- 915–926 Ralph I of Ostrevent, also count of Amiens and the Vexin, married daughter, Eldegarde, of preceding
- 926–943 Ralph II, also count of Amiens and the Vexin, son of preceding
- 943-after 992 Walter I, also count of Amiens and the Vexin, apparently brother or son of preceding
- about 998-after 1017 Walter II the White, also count of Amiens and the Vexin, son of preceding
- 1017/24–1038 Ralph III of Valois
- 1025–1074 Ralph IV, also count of the Vexin and Amiens after 1063, whose third wife was Anne of Kiev, dowager queen of France (that marriage was childless)
- 1074–1077 Simon de Crépy, also count of the Vexin and Amiens, he became a monk, and his lands were dispersed, Valois going to his sister's husband
- Adele of Valois – the sister of Simon

=== Vermandois Carolingian counts ===
- Herbert IV (−1080), Count of Vermandois, a descendant of Pepin II, became count of Valois by marriage with Adele, daughter of Ralph IV
- Odo I the Insane (1080–1085), Count of Vermandois and of Valois, son of previous, he was disinheredited by the council of Barons of France and then he was lord of Saint-Simon by marriage.
- Adelaide – sister of previous, countess of Vermandois and Valois, wife of Hugh.

=== Capetian counts ===
- Hugh (1085–1101), count of Vermandois and of Valois in the right of his wife, Adelaide; son of King Henry I and Anne of Kiev
- Ralph I the Valiant (1102–1152), also known as Le Borgne, count of Vermandois and of Valois, son of Hugh and Adelaide
- Ralph II (1152–1167), count of Vermandois and of Valois, son of Ralph I and of Petronilla of Aquitaine
- Elisabeth (1167–1183)
  - Philip of Alsace (1167–1185), count of Flanders (1168–1191), count of Vermandois and of Valois by marriage
- Eleanor (1183–1214), sister of Elisabeth, contender with Philip

After Eleanor, the county passed into the royal domain under King Philip II.

- John Tristan (1269–1270)

=== Valois counts ===
In royal domain

- Charles I (1284–1325)
- Philip I (1325–1328)

in royal domain

- Philip II (1344–1375)
- in royal domain
- Louis I (1386?–1406; later created Duke of Orléans and Valois in 1392)

== Dukes of Valois ==
- Louis I (1392–1406)
- Charles d'Orléans (1406–1465)
- Louis (1465–1498)

in royal domain

- François (Duke 1498–1515, King of France as Francis I, 1515–1547)

in royal domain but granted to several ladies of the royal house

- Marguerite de Valois (1582–1615)

in royal domain

- Gaston (1626–1660)
  - Jean Gaston d'Orléans (1650–1652)
- Philippe de France (1660–1701)
  - Philippe Charles d'Orléans (1664–1666)
  - Alexandre Louis d'Orléans (1673–1676)
- Philippe d'Orléans (1701–1723)
- Louis d'Orléans (1723–1752)
- Louis Philippe d'Orléans (1752–1785)
  - 1773–1785 Louis Philippe d'Orléans (1773–1850)
- Philippe d'Orléans (1785–1793)
- Louis Philippe d'Orléans (1773–1850)

Thus the house of Valois is descended from Charles I, and has been divided into several lines, three of which have reigned in France. These are:

1. the direct line, beginning with Philip VI, which reigned from 1328 to 1498
2. the Orléans branch, descended from Louis XII, from 1498 to 1515
3. the Angoulême branch, descendants of John, Count of Angoulême, from 1515 to 1589.

Other Valois branches are: the dukes of Alençon, descendants of Charles, a younger son of Charles I, count of Valois; the Dukes of Anjou, descendants of Louis, the second son of King John II; and the dukes of Burgundy, descendants of Philip, the fourth son of the same king.
