= Ralph the Timid =

Norman nobleman and earl in England (died 1057)

Personal details
- Died: 1057
- Resting place: Peterborough Abbey
- Spouse: Gytha
- Children: Harold

Ralph the Timid, also known as Ralf of Mantes (died 1057), was Earl of Hereford between 1051 and 1055 or 1057. His mother was Godgifu, the daughter of King Æthelred the Unready and his second wife Emma. His father was Drogo of Mantes, Count of Valois and the Vexin, who died on pilgrimage to Jerusalem in 1035.

Ralph came to England with his uncle, the future King Edward the Confessor, in 1041. He attested three charters as earl in 1050, and his earldom was probably located in the East Midlands, where the lands of his wife Gytha were located. He was a benefactor of Peterborough Abbey. When King Edward quarrelled with Earl Godwin in 1051, Ralph raised the levies of his earldom to support the king. Godwin and his sons were forced into exile, but they returned the following year, and Ralph and Earl Odda commanded the fleet raised to resist them, but they were unable to prevent their return in triumph.

Later in 1052 Godwin's son Sweyn died on pilgrimage to Jerusalem, and it was probably at this stage that Ralph was given Sweyn's earldom of Hereford, which included Oxfordshire. In 1055 Ælfgar, the Earl of East Anglia, was exiled and allied himself with the ruler of Wales, Gruffydd ap Llywelyn. Ralph met them in battle on 24 October, but suffered a disastrous defeat, and the invaders sacked Hereford. It was later claimed that Ralph and his Frenchmen started the rout, resulting in his insulting nickname, 'the Timid'. Godwin's son, Harold, the future king, then chased the invaders back into Wales. Ann Williams suggested that Ralph probably lost his earldom of Hereford to Harold after his defeat in 1055, but in the view of Frank Barlow he held it until his death.

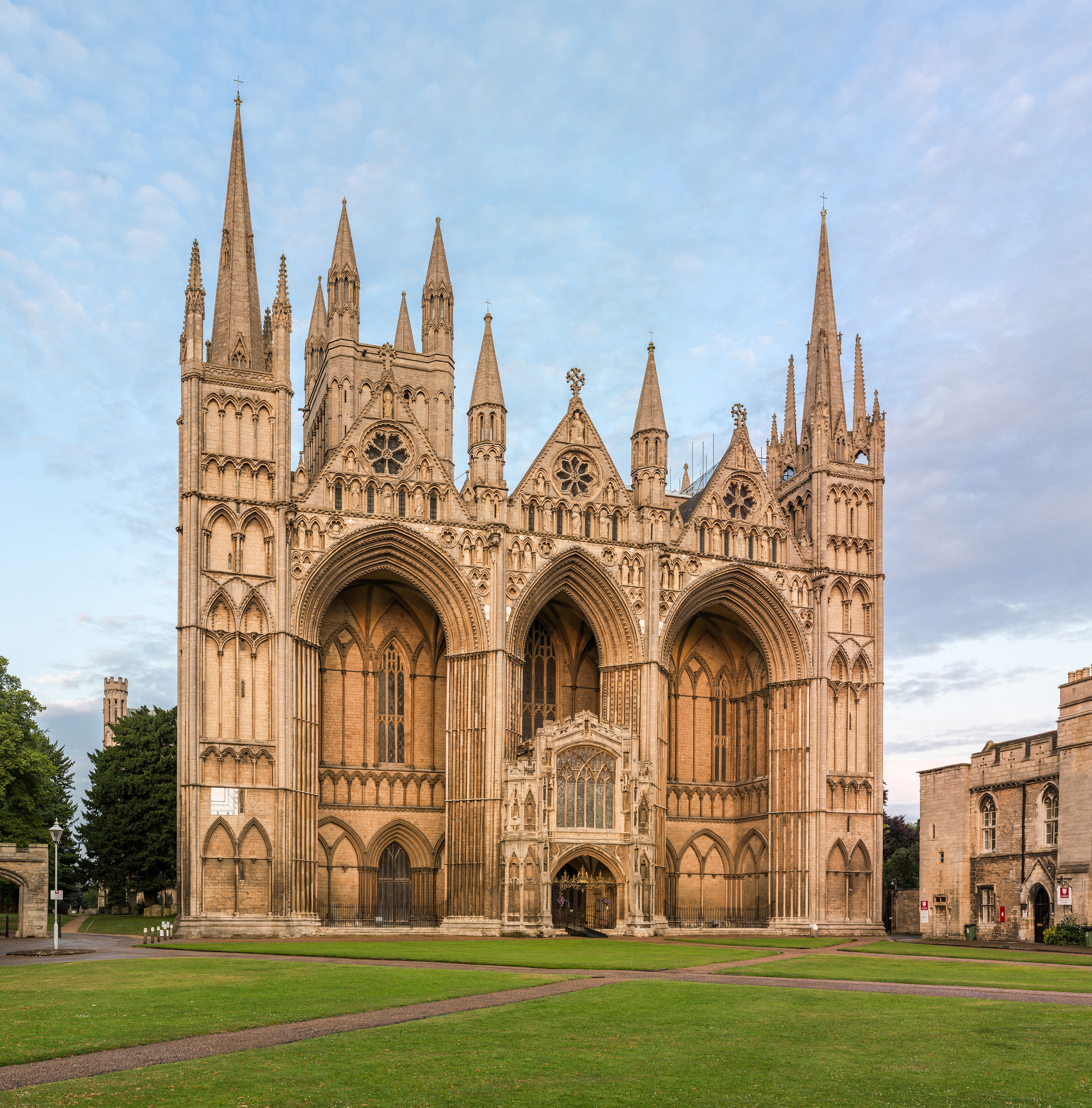
Peterborough Cathedral, the site of Ralph's burial

The Norman poet Gaimar wrote that in 1057, Earl Ralph took the earldom of East Anglia, after the death of Leofric in August 1057. Ralph would have held it only a few months, as he (Earl Ralph) died in his early thirties on 21 December 1057, and was buried at Peterbourgh Abbey.

"Then died earl Leofric. Of his honour was Raulf seized. But little time he held it, and soon ended. He was a right good man, a short time he lived. The earl was buried at Peterborough."

The Earldom of East Anglia then went to Ælfgar, Earl of Mercia

Ralph's son Harold was one of the royal children brought up by King Edward's wife, Edith. Ralph was on good terms with the Godwins, and his son may have been named after the future king and been his godson. Harold Godwinson may have been given the earldom of Hereford to hold until the Ralph's son came of age. The younger Harold survived the Conquest and later received part of his father's lands, as well as Ewyas Harold, which is named after him. His descendants are the Sudeleys of Toddington, Gloucestershire.

== Citations ==
Preceded by Sweyn Godwinson	Earl of Herefordshire; 1052–1057	Succeeded by Merged with Wessex
