= Herbert IV =

Herbert IV may refer to:

- Herbert IV, Count of Meaux (circa 950–995)
- Herbert IV, Count of Vermandois (1028–1080)
