= Drogo of Mantes =

Count of Valois and the Vexin in the early eleventh century

Count of Valois and the Vexin
- Reign: 1027-1035
- Born: 996
- Died: 1035
- Spouse: Goda of England
- Issue: Walter III of the Vexin; Ralph the Timid; Foulques de Vexin
- Father: Walter II, Count of Valois, Vexin and Amiens
- Mother: Adela

Drogo of Mantes (996–1035) (In French: Dreux de Vexin) was the count of Valois and the Vexin in the early eleventh century from 1027 to his death. He was the oldest son of Walter II, count of Valois, Vexin and Amiens, and his wife Adela. His father died between 1017 and 1024, leaving Vexin and Amiens to him and Valois to his younger brother Ralph. His capital was Mantes, thus his byname. He married Goda, daughter of King Ethelred the Unready of England and Queen Emma of Normandy and the sister of King Edward the Confessor. Their sons were Walter (Gautier) III, Count of the Vexin, and Ralph the Timid, earl of Hereford, and Foulques (Fulk) de Vexin. Drogo is reported to have died in 1035 while on pilgrimage to the Holy Land.

== Sources ==
- Douglas, David Charles (1966). William the Conqueror. University of California Press.
