= Godgifu (daughter of Æthelred the Unready) =

Daughter of King Ethelred the Unready

- Born: c.1004
- Died: c.1049/1056
- Spouse: Drogo of Mantes; Eustace II, Count of Boulogne
- Issue: Ralph the Timid; Gautier III; Foulques de Vexin
- House: Wessex
- Father: Æthelred the Unready
- Mother: Emma of Normandy

Goda or Godgifu or Gode (c. 1004 – c. 1049/1056) was the daughter of King Æthelred the Unready of England and Emma of Normandy, and sister of King Edward the Confessor.

She married firstly Drogo of Mantes, count of the Véxin, probably on 7 April 1024, and had sons by him:

- Ralph the Timid, earl of Hereford
- Walter III, count of the Vexin (d.1063), married Biota of Maine (d.1063), daughter of Herbert I of Maine; they both died in suspicious circumstances in the captivity of William II of Normandy
- Fulk (d.1068)

She married secondly Count Eustace II of Boulogne in 1035. This marriage was childless.

Historians disagree about the date of her death. Heather Tanner dates it c.1047 and says that Eustace remarried c.1049, whereas Elisabeth van Houts dates her death c. 1056. According to David Bates, the marriage between Godgifu and Eustace was criticised for unspecified reasons at the Council of Reims in 1049, which was presided over by the pope. This seems to have resulted in an end to the marriage and her return to England, where she was treated generously by her brother.

After the Norman Conquest of England by William the Conqueror, the lands owned by Goda in Buckinghamshire were given to the Flemish-Norman knight Bertram de Verdun, lord of Farnham Royal, and the Breton knight Raoul, count of Fougères.
