= Odo V =

11th century count of Troyes and Meaux

Odo V was Count of Troyes and of Meaux, including Vitry-le-François, from 1089 to his death, in 1093. Son of Theobald III and Adele of Valois, he was succeeded by his younger brother, Hugh, Count of Champagne.
