= Nibelung IV =

French Count of the Vexin in the ninth century

Nibelung IV was a Frankish noble Count of the Vexin in the ninth century from the Nibelungid family.

== Life ==
Nibelung was born around the year 810 to Nibelung III. He is mentioned in 843 as being in Valenciennes among the followers of Charles the Bald. The latter sent him in 853 with Hugh and Gauzbert as missi dominici responsible for inspecting the three counties of Nevers, Avallon and Auxerre. Nibelung is most likely to have taken charge of Avallon.

Charles the Bald entrusted him with the County of the Vexin in 864. He then appears in 868 at a royal court, in 877 as executor of his first cousin Echard and in 879 in a charter of Count Adelram II.

From an unknown wife he had three children: Theodoric, Adhemar and a daughter of an unknown name married to Adelram II and the mother of Adelram III. Another interpretation is that Nivelon IV married the daughter of Adelram I, and his son was Adelram II, who had two sons, Theodoric (Tirel), and Adelram III (Waleran I de Vexin)
