= Hugh, Count of Vermandois =

French noble (1057–1101)

Hugh
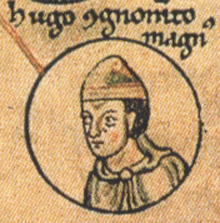

Count of Vermandois and Valois
- Reign: 1085–1101
- Predecessor: Odo I
- Successor: Ralph I
- Born: 1057
- Died: 18 October 1101 (aged 44); Tarsus, Cilicia (modern-day Tarsus, Mersin, Turkey)
- Spouse: Adelaide, Countess of Vermandois
- Issue more...: Elizabeth, Countess of Leicester; Ralph I, Count of Vermandois
- House: Capet
- Father: Henry I, King of France
- Mother: Anne of Kiev

Hugh (1057 – October 18, 1101), called the Great (French: Hugues le Grand, Latin: Hugo Magnus) was the first count of Vermandois from the House of Capet. His wife, Adelaide de Vermandois was the heiress and holder of the title of Countess of Vermandois, holding the lineage rights, but Hugh ruled as Count of Vermandois jure uxoris (by right of his wife) from 1085 to 1101. He is known primarily for being one of the leaders of the First Crusade. His nickname Magnus (greater or elder) is probably a bad translation into medieval Latin of an Old French nickname, le Maisné, meaning "the younger", referring to Hugh as younger brother of King Philip I of France. (Note: Cf. Steven Runciman; Rosalind Hill traces the error to the anonymous Gesta Francorum, and explains it as a confusion with the old French "maisné" (younger brother))

== Early years ==
Hugh was a younger son of King Henry I of France and Anne of Kiev and younger brother of Philip I. He became the first Capetian count of Vermandois after his mentally deficient brother-in-law, Odo, was disinherited. In 1085, Hugh helped William the Conqueror repel a Danish invasion of England.

== First Crusade ==
In early 1096, Hugh and Philip began discussing the First Crusade after news of the Council of Clermont reached them in Paris. Although Philip could not participate, as he had been excommunicated, Hugh was said to have been influenced to join the Crusade after an eclipse of the moon on 11 February 1096. In late August 1096, Hugh and his Crusader army left France and travelled via the Alps and Rome to Bari, where he would cross the Adriatic Sea into territory of the Byzantine Empire, unlike most crusaders who travelled over land.

His armada was possibly commanded by Arnout II, Count of Aarschot. According to Anna Komnene's chronicle the Alexiad, Hugh sent a message (that she called absurd) to her father, Byzantine emperor Alexios I Komnenos, demanding a proper welcome:

Know, Emperor, that I am the King of Kings, the greatest of all beneath the heavens. It is fitting that I should be met on my arrival and received with the pomp and ceremony appropriate to my noble birth.

In response to this message the emperor sent instructions to his nephew John Komnenos, the doux (governor) of Dyrrhachium, and Nicholas Maurokatakalon, commander of the Byzantine fleet, to look out for Hugh and to inform him immediately when he arrived.

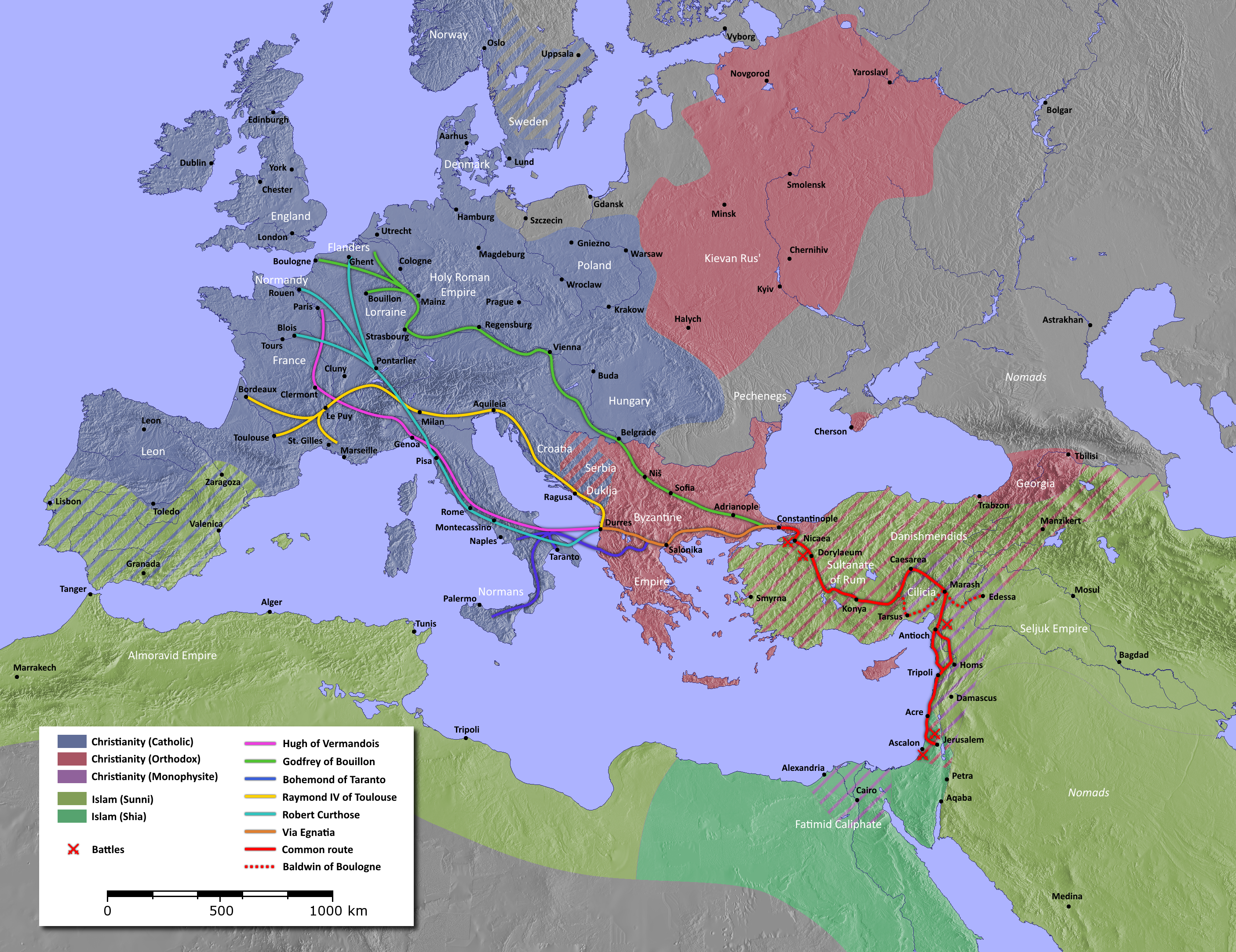
The routes of the crusaders, with Hugh's coloured magenta

Meanwhile Hugh had reached the coast of Longobardi and dispatched twenty-four envoys to the doux of Dyrrhachium with the following message: "Be it known to you, Doux, that our Lord Hugh is almost here. He brings with him from Rome the golden standard of St Peter. Understand, moreover, that he is supreme commander of the Frankish army. See to it then that he is accorded a reception worthy of his rank and yourself prepare to meet him." Whilst sailing the Adriatic Sea from Bari towards Illyricum, Hugh's fleet was overtaken by a heavy storm and most ships were lost. His own ship was thrown upon the shore near Epirus. When Hugh was found and brought to Dyrrhachium, John Komnenos treated him to a banquet and he was allowed to rest. By order of the emperor, Hugh was closely escorted by Manuel Boutoumites. Eventually Hugh was given an audience by the emperor, who persuaded him to become his liegeman.

The German historian Hans Eberhard Mayer argued that Alexios was fortunate that the first contingent of the crusader army to arrive in Constantinople, led by Hugh, was very small and easy to control. Alexios 'discreetly but unmistakably' restricted Hugh's freedom of movement 'until he was ready to swear that all territories which had belonged to Byzantium before the Turkish invasions would be restored. Moreover any conquests made to the east [...] would be held as fiefs.'

Anna Komnene recorded a conversation between Hugh and Godfrey of Bouillon, wherein Hugh tried to persuade Godfrey to pledge allegiance to Alexios. Godfrey, however, refused, saying: "you left your own country as a ruler [...] with all that wealth and a strong army; now from the heights you've brought yourself to the level of a slave. And then, as if you had won some great success, have you come here to tell me to do the same?" Hugh replied: "we ought to have stayed in our own countries and kept our hands off other people's [...] but since we've come thus far and need the emperor's protection, no good will come of it unless we obey his orders."

After the Crusaders had successfully made their way across Seljuk territory and, in 1098, captured the city after siege of Antioch, Hugh was sent back to Constantinople to appeal for reinforcements from Alexios. The emperor was uninterested, (Note: In "Urban's Crusade--Success or Failure" (Key, 1948) it is argued, indeed to the contrary, that the emperor was disturbed by Hugh's report and the disquieting rumors emitting from Antioch (on Bohemond's intent and conduct) and promptly set out to prepare another expedition: "...Alexios immediately began preparations for another expedition, and he furthermore sent envoys to the crusaders to announce its coming.") however, and Hugh, instead of returning to Antioch to help plan the siege of Jerusalem, went back to France. There he was scorned for not having fulfilled his vow as a Crusader to complete a pilgrimage to Jerusalem, and Pope Paschal II threatened to excommunicate him. He joined the subsequent Crusade of 1101, but was wounded in battle with the Turks led by Kilij Arslan at the second battle of Heraclea in September, and died of his wounds in October in Tarsus.

Coat of arms of the capetian counts of Vermandois

== Family ==
Hugh married Adelaide of Vermandois, the daughter of Herbert IV, Count of Vermandois and Adele of Valois. The couple had the following nine children.

- Matilda, who married Ralph I of Beaugency;
- Elizabeth, Countess of Leicester (died 1138), married, firstly, Robert de Beaumont, 1st Earl of Leicester and secondly, William de Warenne, 2nd Earl of Surrey
- Beatrice (fl. 1144), who married Hugh IV of Gournay
- Ralph I, Count of Vermandois (died 1152), married, firstly, Eleanor of Champagne and secondly, Petronille of Aquitaine
- Constance, who married Godfrey de la Ferté-Gaucher
- Agnes (fl. 1125), who married Boniface del Vasto
- Henry, Lord of Chaumont en Vexin (died 1130)
- Simon (died 1148)
- William (died c. 1096).

== Sources ==
- Asbridge, Thomas (2004). The First Crusade, a new history. The roots of conflict between Christianity and Islam. Oxford University Press.
- Bardot, Michael L.; Marvin, Laurence W., eds. (2018). Louis VII and his World. Brill.
- Brown, Reginald Allen (1984). The Normans. The Boydell Press.
- Crouch, David (2008). "The Historian, Lineage and Heraldry 1050-1250". In Coss, Peter R.; Keen, Maurice (eds.). Heraldry, Pageantry and Social Display in Medieval England. Boydell Press.
- Flori, Jean (1999). Pierre L'Ermite et la Première Croisade (in French). Fayard.
- Guibert of Nogent (1996). Huygens, R.B.C. (ed.). Dei gesta per Francos. Vol. 7. Turnhout.
- Hill, R.; Mynors, R. A. B., eds. (1962). Gesta Francorum et aliorum Hierosolimitanorum. London.
- Komnene, Anna (2009). Sewter, E.R.A.; Frankopan, Peter (eds.). The Alexiad. Penguin.
- Mayer, Hans Eberhard (1972). Gillingham, John (ed.). The Crusades. Oxford University Press.
- Peters, Edward (1971). The First Crusade. University of Pennsylvania Press. ISBN 0812210174.
- de Pontfarcy, Yolande (1995). "Si Marie de France était Marie de Meulan". Cahiers de Civilisation Médiévale Année (in French). 38–152: 353-361.
- Previte Orton, C. W. (1912). The Early History of the House of Savoy: 1000-1233. Cambridge at the University Press.
- Suger (1992). The Deeds of Louis the Fat. Translated by Cusimano, Richard C.; Moorhead, John. Catholic University of America Press.
- Tanner, Heather (2004). Families, Friends and Allies: Boulogne and Politics in Northern France and England, c. 879-1160. Brill.
- Tyerman, Christopher (2015). How to Plan a Crusade. Reason and Religious War in the High Middle Ages. Pegasus.

Hugh, Count of Vermandois House of Capet Born: 1057 Died: 18 October 1101
French nobility
| Preceded by Odo | Count of Vermandois with Adelaide; 1085–1101 | Succeeded by Ralph I |
| Preceded by Odo I | Count of Valois with Adelaide; 1085-1101 | Succeeded by Ralph I |
