= Ralph II of the Vexin =

French count from 926 to 943

Ralph II (died 943) was a French Count of the Vexin, Amiens and Valois from 926 to 943.

He was the son of Ralph I de Gouy, Count of Ostrevent, Vexin, Amiens and Valois. He married a woman named Liutgarde but died without issue.

He built the fortress of Crépy-en-Valois. In 941, Eudes de Vermandois, Count of Vienne, captured Amiens. Ralph attacked him to retake the city, but he was killed during a battle. According to other sources, he tried to take advantage of the death of Count Herbert II of Vermandois to seize Saint-Quentin, but was killed by Herbert's son Adalbert, Castellan of Ribemont.

His widow remarried to Galéran I of Meulan, Viscount of Meulan. In 944, Eudes was chased from Amiens by royal troops. A few years later, Walter, Ralph's brother, reunited the three counties.

Ralph inspired the Chanson de Geste hero Raoul de Cambrai.
