= Walter II of the Vexin =

French count from 992 to 1024

Walter II, the White (c. 955-c.1024), was a French Count of the Vexin, Amiens and Valois from 992 to around 1024.

He was the son of Count Walter I of the Vexin and Adèle, daughter of Count Fulk II the Good of Anjou.

Around 1006, he exempted the abbeys of Jumièges and Saint-Wandrille from taxes, indicating good relations with the Duchy of Normandy and the Archbishopric of Rouen. He also negotiated the marriage of his son Drogo to Godgifu, sister of King Edmund Ironside of England, who had taken refuge at the court of Normandy in 1013.

He died between 1017 and 1024 during a feud between King Robert II and Count Eudes II of Blois, which influenced the division of his counties between his sons: Amiens and Vexin went to Drogo, a Capetian loyalist, and Valois went to Ralph III, a supporter of the House of Blois.

He married around 980 a certain Adèle, of whom nothing is known. Together they had:

- Drogo, Count of Vexin and Amiens (d.1035)
- Fulk, Bishop of Amiens (d.1035)
- Ralph III, Count of Valois (d.1038)
