= Claude Carlier =

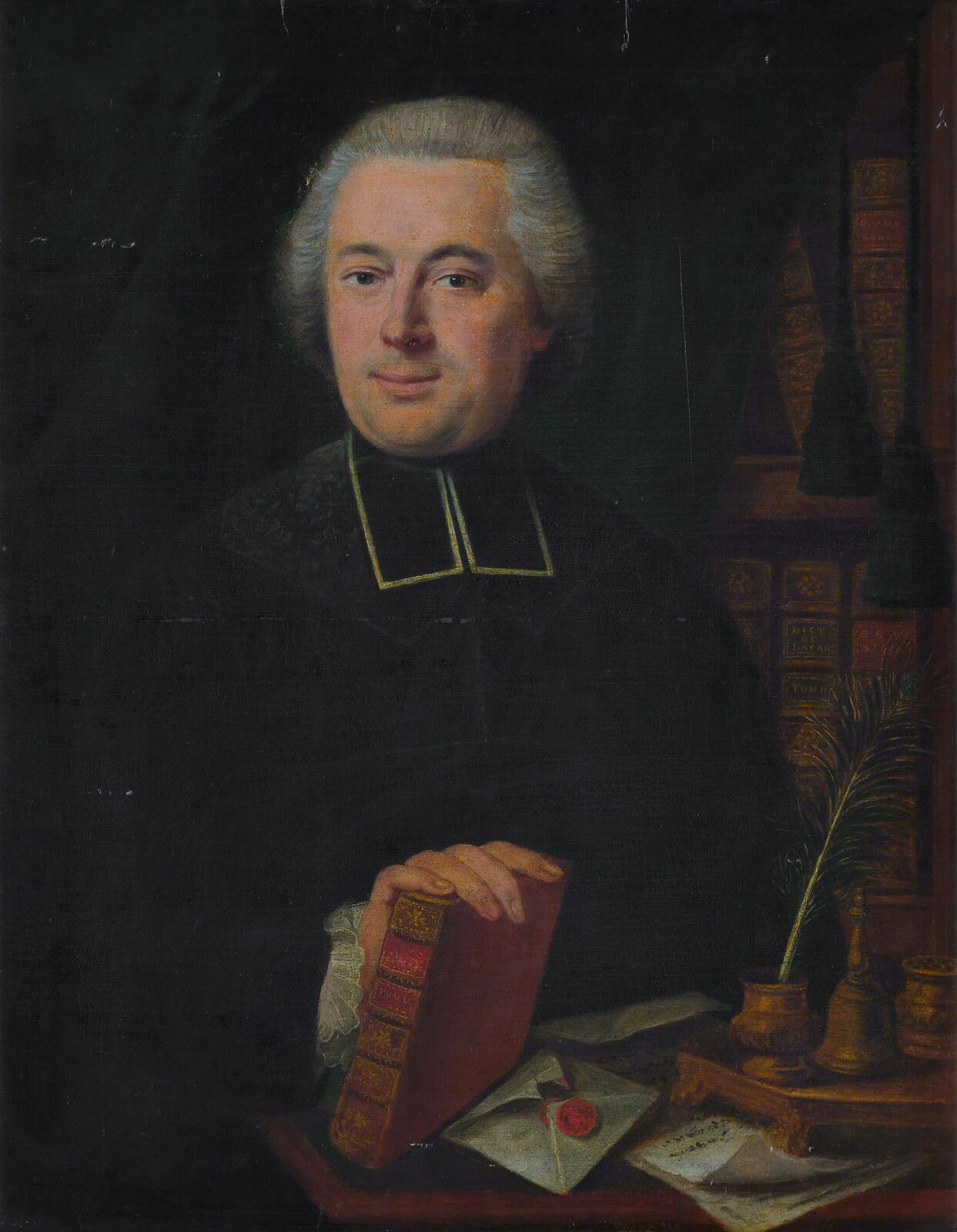
Portrait of Carlier, now in the Museum Boijmans Van Beuningen

Claude Carlier (7 September 1725 – 25 April 1787), called the Abbé Carlier, was a French religious, historian and agronomist. He was the prior of Andrésy and prévôt royal (royal provost) of the châtellenie (castellany) of Verberie, where he was born and died.

Carlier came to public notice when he participated in a contest held by the Academy of Amiens and sponsored by the intendant of finances Daniel-Charles Trudaine between 1752 and 1754. The contest asked whether France could do without foreign wool, and how French wool production could be improved in both quality and quantity. Carlier had a deep knowledge of sheep breeding, the fleece trade and the different kinds of wool produced by different sheep breeds. He won the contest with an essay arguing that Spanish and English breeds produced better wool. A few years later, the controller-general of finances, Henri Bertin, hired Carlier as a consultant-propagandist tasked with promoting new breeds of sheep and new shepherding practices.

In 1762, Carlier published Considerations on the Means of Re-establishing in France Good Species of Wool Sheep and Bertin distributed copies to agricultural societies throughout France. In 1763, when Bertin turned his attention to Flemish sheep, Carlier produced a book on the subject, Instruction in the Manner of Raising and Perfecting the Good Species of Wool Sheep in Flanders. This book was highly influential in the subsequent adoption of Flemish breeds throughout France. Carlier was then tasked with producing a questionnaire to be sent to all the regions of France on breeding practices. This elicited over 300 responses. Carlier himself synthesised the data in a two-volume publication in 1770, Treaty on Wool Sheep, or a Method of Raising and Perfecting the Herds in the Fields and the Sheepfold, a Practical Work.

Carlier wrote an important history of the County and Duchy of Valois.

== Bibliography ==
- Dissertation sur l'état du commerce en France, sous les rois de la première et de la seconde race, qui a remporté le prix au jugement de l'Académie d'Amiens en 1752 (Amiens: Veuve Godart, 1753)
- Dissertation sur l'étendue du Belgium et sur l'ancienne Picardie, qui a remporté le prix au jugement de l'Académie d'Amiens (Amiens: Veuve Godart, 1753)
- Mémoire sur les laines, qui a remporté le prix au jugement de l'Académie d'Amiens en 1754, en l'année 1754 par Monsieur de Blancheville (Amiens: Veuve Godart, 1755)
- Considérations sur les moyens de rétablir en France les bonnes espèces de bêtes à laine (Paris: Guillyn, 1762)
- Journal historique du voyage fait au cap de Bonne-Espérance, par feu M. l'abbé de La Caille, précédé d'un Discours sur la vie de l'auteur, suivi de remarques sur les coutumes des Hottentots et des habitans du Cap (Paris: Guillyn, 1763)
- Instruction sur la manière d'élever et de perfectionner la bonne espèce des bêtes à laine en Flandre (Paris: Guillyn, 1763)
- Histoire du duché de Valois : ornée de cartes et de gravures : contenant ce qui est arrivé dans ce pays depuis le temps des gaulois, et depuis l'origine de la monarchie françoise, jusqu'en l'année 1703, 3 vols. (Paris: Guillyn, 1764)
- Traité des bêtes à laine, ou Méthode d'élever et de perfectionner les troupeaux aux champs et à la bergerie, ouvrage pratique, 2 vols. (Paris: Vallat la Chapelle, 1770)
- Examen du sentiment de M. Roland de la Platière sur les troupeaux, sur les laines et sur les manufactures (Paris: Buisson, 1787)
