= Priory of Saint-Arnoul =

Priory and abbey in France

Coordinates: 49.2383°N 2.8831°E

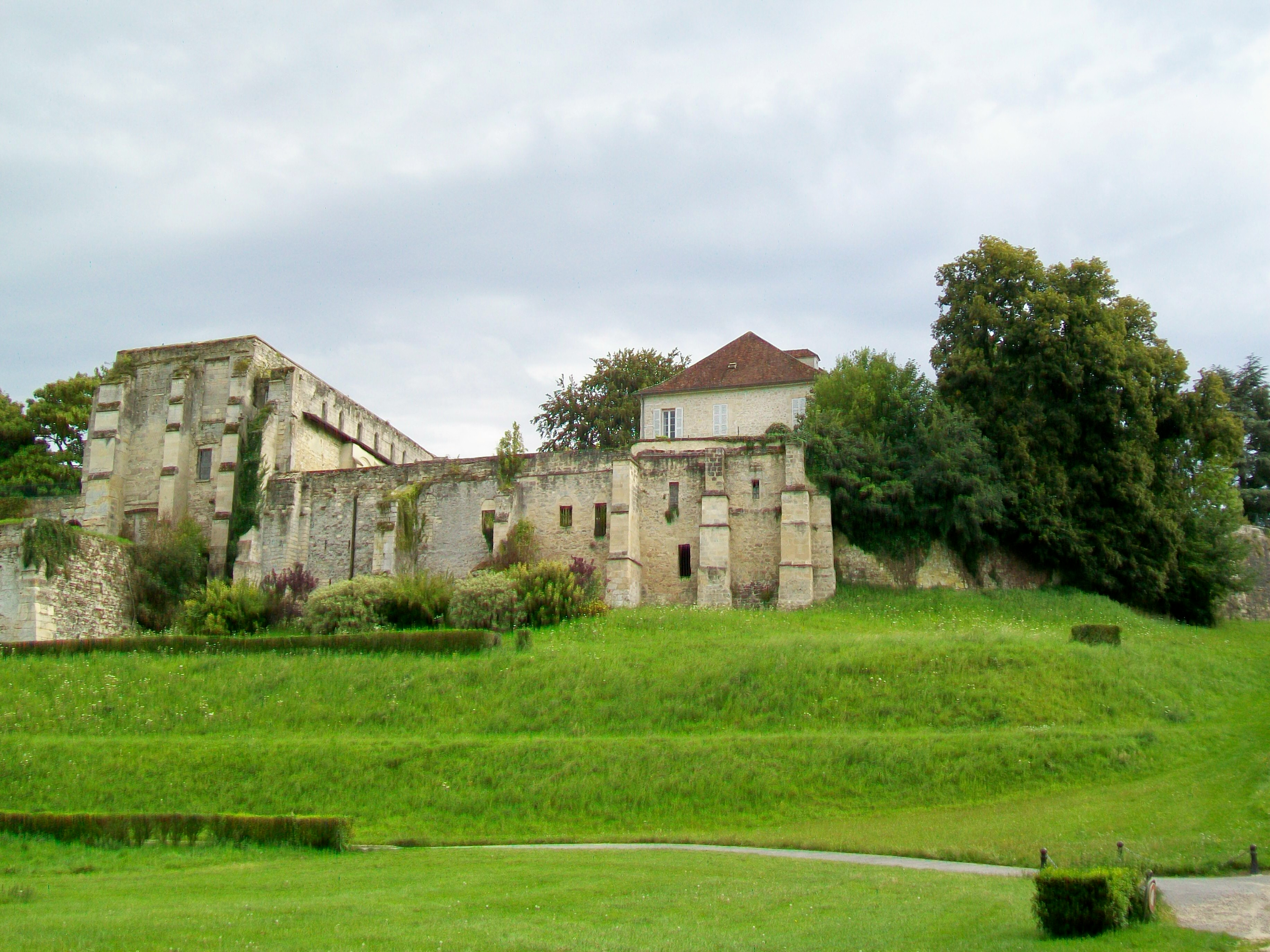
The convent, adjoining the wall.

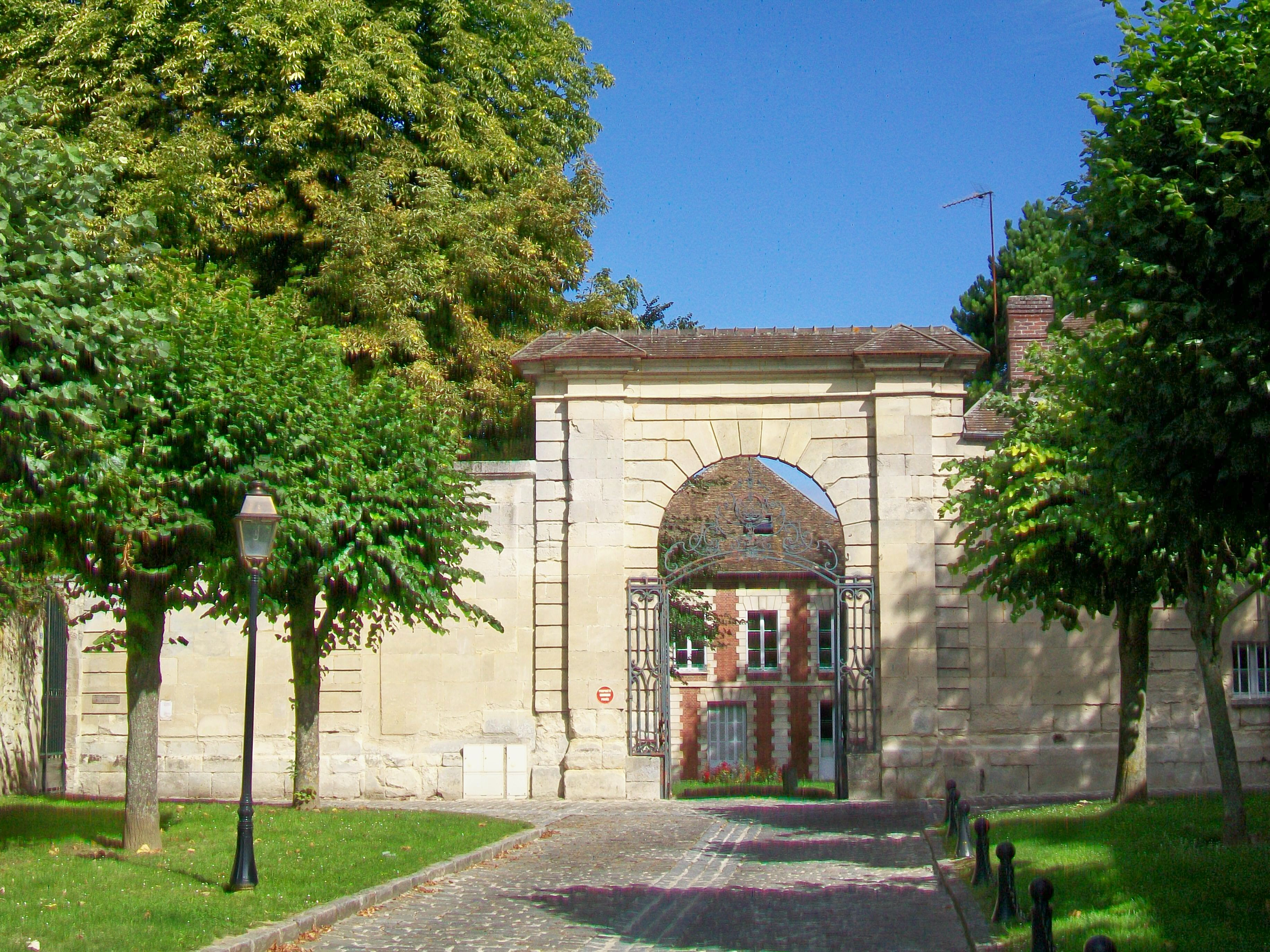
Gateway to the prior's courtyard.

The Priory of Saint-Arnoul, named after a legendary fifth-century bishop of Tours, is located in Crépy-en-Valois in France. It was founded between 935 and 943 by Count Ralph II of Valois as a chapter of canons regular, then re-founded as a Benedictine abbey by Count Walter II in 1008. In 1076, Count Simon, on a pilgrimage to Rome, offered it to Abbot Hugh of Cluny as a daughter house. Their meeting was itself the work of Pope Gregory VII. Hugh returned to France with Simon and personally stayed at Saint-Arnoul to reform it along Cluniac lines, against the resistance of the monks. In the twelfth and thirteenth centuries, the priory prospered through numerous gifts. The west wall and the Romanesque crypt, both preserved today, were built in the final decades of the eleventh century. The main buildings, in use until the dissolution of the priory, were constructed in the Gothic style in four separate campaigns between 1170 and 1260.

Saint-Arnoul was subject to the direct authority of Cluny, and was one of the highest ranking Cluniac priories. Its charter specified that it had twenty-eight members, but in the early fourteenth century this number was exceeded. The priory suffered heavily during the Hundred Years' War (1337–1453). Its choir was burnt by the English in 1431 and never rebuilt. In the sixteenth century the commendatory priors replaced the furnishings, and in the eighteenth the conventual buildings were renovated.

In 1790, the French Revolution formally abolished all religious orders and Saint-Arnoul was suppressed. The prior's house became a private residence, which it remains today. The east wing of the priory became a boarding school, which it remained until 1940. The building still stands. All the other buildings fell into ruin or were destroyed. The medieval ruins are preserved as a monument historique (historic monument) according to a decree of 24 February 1943. Nonetheless, some medieval walls were destroyed in 1964, when the municipal government proceeded with work without the approval of the Service des Monuments Historiques. The gateway to the courtyard of the prior's house, erected in 1759, was also inscribed as a historic monument on 9 March 1979. The Association pour la restauration et l'animation de Saint-Arnoul (Association for the Restoration and Animation of Saint-Arnoul) currently oversees the surviving east wing. Restored areas are open to the public. Of most interest to researchers is the crypt, which is of unusually large size and of a style rare for the region. It was designed after the crypt of the abbey of Saint-Benoît-sur-Loire.
