= Walter I of the Vexin =

10th century French count

Walter I (died 992) was a Count of the Vexin, Amiens and Valois from 943 to 992. For most of his life he lived in West Francia.

He was the son of Count Ralph I of the Vexin and Hildegard. He succeeded his childless brother Ralph II of the Vexin in 943.

He became Count of Amiens quite young, upon the death of his brother, killed in a battle. A loyal vassal to Hugh Capet, he was able to reconstitute the union of the three counties of Amiens, Vexin and Valois in 965. He maintained good relations with the Archbishop of Rouen, Hugh, Vexin being dependent on this diocese. In 991, his sister-in-law Liutgarde, whom held the viscounties of Mantes and Meulan in dower, died. Walter recovered Mantes, while Meulan returned to Liutgarde's son Galéran II.

Walter's first marriage was to a woman named Eva, the daughter of the Count of Dreux. Secondly, he married around 950, Adèle, daughter of Fulk II, Count of Anjou and Gerberga of the Rorgonids.

From this second marriage he had:

- Walter II the White
- Guy, Bishop of Soissons
- Ralph, cited in 975
- Geoffroy cited in 987
