= Odo I of Saint-Simon =

11th century Frankish noble

Odo I (Eudes I), called “the Foolish” (fatuus), was the ruler of Saint-Simon. The last Carolingian male from the Herbertine branch, he was the first son of Herbert IV, Count of Vermandois and Adele of Valois.

Following the marriage of his sister, Adelaide, Countess of Vermandois, to Hugh, Odo was disinherited and Hugh inherited Vermandois. (Note: "All of Herbert's lands would go to Hugh upon Herbert's death in 1080, giving the Capetians an important foothold.")

== Sources ==
- Gabriele, Matthew (2008). "The Provenance of the Descriptio Qauliter Karolus Magnus: Remembering the Carolingians in the entourage of King Philip I (1060–1108) before the First Crusade". Viator. 39 (2). University of California Press: 93–117.
