= Ralph III of Valois =

Ralph III (French: Raoul; died 1038) was the count of Valois from his father's death until his own. He was the second son of Walter II, count of Valois, Vexin and Amiens, and his wife Adela. His father died between 1017 and 1024, leaving Vexin and Amiens to Ralph's older brother Drogo of Mantes.

Ralph married Alix of Breteuil, heiress of the lordship of Nanteuil-le-Haudouin. They had two sons, Ralph (Raoul) IV and Theobald (Thibaud). Ralph IV succeeded to the county of Valois, while Theobald received Nanteuil, founding the house of Crépy-Nanteuil. Ralph III also divided the castle of Crépy itself between his sons. The house and the outbuildings went to Ralph, while the keep went to Theobald.
