= Theobald III of Blois =

Count of Blois

Theobald III, Count of Blois
- Born: 1012
- Died: 1089 (aged 76–77)
- Noble family: House of Blois
- Spouses: Gersende of Maine; Adele of Valois
- Issue: Philip; Stephen, Count of Blois; Odo V, Count of Troyes; Hughes of Champagne; Hawise
- Father: Odo II, Count of Blois
- Mother: Ermengarde of Auvergne

Theobald III of Blois (French: Thibaut; 1012–1089) was count of Blois, Meaux and Troyes. He was captured in 1044 by Geoffrey II, Count of Anjou, and exchanged the County of Touraine for his freedom. Theobald used his nephew's involvement with the Norman invasion of England to gain authority over the County of Champagne. He died in 1089.

== Inherits Blois ==
Theobald was son of Odo II, Count of Blois and Ermengarde of Auvergne. Upon his father's death in 1037, Theobald inherited amongst others the counties of Blois, Tours, Chartres, Châteaudun, and Sancerre, as well as Château-Thierry, Provins, and St. Florentin in Champagne. His brother Stephen inherited the counties of Meaux, Troyes and Vitry-le-François. By 1044, Geoffrey Martel, the Count of Anjou, was besieging Tours and Theobald responded by attempting to relieve the city. They met in battle at Nouy and Theobald was captured and had to give up the county of Touraine in order to regain his freedom. From then on the centre of power for the House of Blois moved to Champagne.

In 1054, Theobald recognized the Holy Roman Emperor, Henry III as his liege which precipitated a meeting at Ivois between Henry I and the emperor. Theobald found ways to become close to the royal court again and gained political influence and began calling himself, Count Palatine.

== Gains Champagne ==
Theobald's nephew, Odo, Count of Champagne joined the army of William the Conqueror and participated in the Norman conquest of England. Theobald used his nephew's absence and his own influence at court to gain control over Odo's possessions in Champagne. He had gained a position of considerable power, which increased when he married the daughter of Ralph IV of Valois. From 1074 onward, he left his son Henry in control of Blois, Châteaudun and Chartres.

== Death ==
Following Theobald's death in 1089, Philip I, King of France, was able to arrange for Blois and Champagne to be divided between Theobald's sons.

== Family and children ==
Theobald's first wife Gersent of Le Mans, daughter of Herbert I, Count of Maine. They had:

1. Stephen, Count of Blois

His second wife Alix de Crepy (Adela) or Adele of Valois, daughter of Ralph IV of Valois and Adélaide of Bar-sur-Aube. They had:

1. Philip, who became bishop of Châlons-sur-Marne
2. Odo, who inherited possessions in Champagne (Troyes). He died in 1093, leaving the possessions to his brother Hugh.
3. Hugh, who became the first to be called count of Champagne.
4. Hawise of Guingamp, wife of Stephen, Count of Tréguier

== Sources ==
- Bouchard, Constance Brittain (2004). "The Kingdom of the Franks to 1108". In Luscombe, David; Riley-Smith, Jonathan (eds.). The New Cambridge Medieval History. Vol. 4, Part 2. Cambridge University Press.
- Bradbury, Jim (1992). The Medieval Siege. The Boydell Press.
- Evergates, Theodore, ed. (1999). Aristocratic Women in Medieval France. University of Pennsylvania Press.
- Evergates, Theodore (2007). The Aristocracy in the County of Champagne, 1100–1300. University of Pennsylvania Press.
- Morin, Stéphane (2010). Trégor, Goëlo, Penthièvre. Le pouvoir des Comtes de Bretagne du XIIe au XIIIe siècle (in French). Presses Universitaires de Rennes.
- Weinfurter, Stefan (1999). The Salian Century: Main Currents in an Age of Transition. University of Pennsylvania Press.

Theobald III of Blois House of Blois Born: 1012 Died: 1089
| Preceded by Odo III | Count of Troyes; 1066–1089 | Succeeded by Odo V |
| Preceded by Odo III | Count of Meaux; 1066–1089 | Succeeded by Stephen Henry |
| Preceded by Odo II | Count of Blois; 1037–1089 | Succeeded by Stephen Henry |
