= Adelaide, Countess of Vermandois =

Countess of Vermandois and Valois from 1080 to 1102

Adelaide
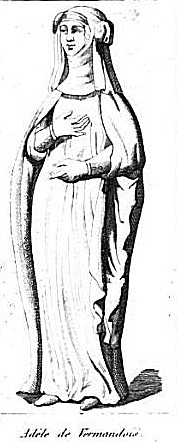
- Depiction of Adelaide of Vermandois in the 19th century book Histoire générale de France depuis les temps les plus reculés jusqu'a nos jours
- Died: 1120 or 1124
- Noble family: Carolingian dynasty, Herbertine Branch
- Spouses: Hugh I, Count of Vermandois; Renaud II, Count of Clermont
- Issue Detail: Matilda; Beatrice; Elizabeth of Vermandois, Countess of Leicester; Ralph I, Count of Vermandois
- Father: Herbert IV, Count of Vermandois
- Mother: Adele of Valois

Adelaide (Adélaïde in French; died 23 September 1120) was suo jure countess of Vermandois and Valois from 1080 to 1102.

Adelaide was the daughter of Herbert IV of Vermandois and Adele of Valois.

By 1080, Adelaide married Hugh, son of the Capetian King Henry I of France and younger brother of Philip I of France. Hugh became Count of Vermandois, following Adelaide's father's death. (Note: All of Herbert’s lands would go to Hugh upon Herbert's death in 1080, giving the Capetians an important foothold.)

In 1104, Adelaide married Renaud II, Count of Clermont-en-Beauvaisis. By this marriage, Adelaide had a daughter, Margaret of Clermont.

In 1102, Adelaide was succeeded by her son, Ralph I. Adelaide died in 1120, being the last Carolingian to hold the County of Vermandois.

== Issue ==
Adelaide and Hugh had:

- Matilda (fl. 1110), married Ralph I of Beaugency
- Beatrice (fl. 1144), married Hugh IV of Gournay
- Elizabeth of Vermandois, Countess of Leicester, (died 1131) married, firstly, Robert de Beaumont, 1st Earl of Leicester and secondly, William de Warenne, 2nd Earl of Surrey
- Ralph I, Count of Vermandois
- Constance, married Godfrey de la Ferté-Gaucher
- Agnes (fl. 1125), married Boniface of Savone
- Henry (died 1130), Lord of Chaumont en Vexin
- Simon (died 1148), bishop of Noyon and Tournai
- William

Adelaide and Renaud had:

- Margaret of Clermont

== Sources ==
- Bardot, Michael L.; Marvin, Laurence W., eds. (2018). Louis VII and his World. Brill.
- Galbert de Bruges (2013). The Murder, Betrayal, and Slaughter of the Glorious Charles, Count of Flanders. Translated by Rider, John Jeffrey. Yale University Press. ISBN 978-0-300-15230-2.
- Crouch, David (2008). "The Historian, Lineage and Heraldry 1050-1250". In Coss, Peter R.; Keen, Maurice (eds.). Heraldry, Pageantry and Social Display in Medieval England. Boydell Press.
- LoPrete, Kimberly A. (2007). Adela of Blois, Countess and Lord (c.1067-1137). Four Courts Press.
- Louda, Jirí; MacLagan, Michael (1999). Lines of Succession: Heraldry of the Royal Families of Europe (2nd ed.). Little, Brown and Company.
- Gabriele, Matthew (2008). "The Provenance of the Descriptio Qauliter Karolus Magnus: Remembering the Carolingians in the entourage of King Philip I (1060–1108) before the First Crusade". Viator. 39 (2). University of California Press: 93–117. doi:10.1484/J.VIATOR.1.100207.
- Suger (1992). The Deeds of Louis the Fat. Translated by Cusimano, Richard C.; Moorhead, John. Catholic University of America Press.
- Tanner, Heather (2004). Families, Friends and Allies: Boulogne and Politics in Northern France and England, c. 879-1160. Brill.

Adelaide, Countess of Vermandois Carolingian dynasty
French nobility
Preceded by Odo	Countess of Vermandois; Countess of Valois with Hugh I 1085–1102	Succeeded by Ralph I
