= Ralph I of the Vexin =

French count

Ralph I (French: Raoul I^{er}; German: Rudolf I.; died 926) was a French Count of the Vexin, Amiens and Valois. He was the son of Heilwise, daughter of Eberhard, Margrave of Friuli and Hucbald de Gouy, Count of Ostrevent.

== Biography ==
Rudolf is first mentioned in 915 in a royal diploma to the Saint-Clément monastery in Champagne. The following year, he became part of King Charles the Simple's entourage in Herstal. The chronicler Flodoard records him as being a follower of Duke Hugh the Great in 925, when he sealed a treaty with the Normans. He died in 926.

== Family ==
In 924 he married Hildegard, daughter and heiress of Count Ermenfroi of Vexin, Amiens and Valois. Ralph administered the counties on behalf of his wife.

From Hildegard he had:

- Ralph II, killed in 943, Count of Vexin, Amiens and Valois
- Walter I, who became Count of Vexin, Amiens and Valois after his brother's death

== Paternity ==
There has been much debate among scholars about the paternity of Raoul I, Count of Laon. The proposal of Hucobald of Gouy is the least controversial and least supported. The most supported and most controversial proposal is Gautier of Laon, the son of Adalram III, who was a Nibelung. Roger I of Laon is also mentioned as a potential father, but the claims of Ralf II to his inheritance were recognized, but awarded to Roger's son to appease political concerns. Laon was perpetually under siege, as it was one of the strongest fortifications in Europe at the time. The story of Ralf II and Walter I, are romanticized in the Chanson, Raoul de Cambrai The possessions of the Nibelungs were widespread, and the descendants of Walter I inherited much of it.
