= Adele of Valois =

French noblewoman

Map of France in 1030

Adele of Valois (Adèle/Adélaïde) was a daughter of Ralph IV of Valois and Adele of Bar-sur-Aube.

She married firstly Herbert IV, Count of Vermandois and they had:

1. Adelaide, Countess of Vermandois
2. Odo I, Count of Vermandois

She was also the second wife of Theobald III, Count of Blois and they had:

1. Philip, who became bishop of Châlons-sur-Marne
2. Odo, who inherited possessions in Champagne (Troyes). He died in 1093, leaving the possessions to his brother Hugh.
3. Hugh, who became the first to be called count of Champagne.
4. Hawise, also known as Hawise of Guingamp, wife of Stephen, Count of Tréguier.
