= Herbert IV of Vermandois =

French noble (1028–1080)

Herbert IV
- Tenure: 1045-1080
- Predecessor: Otto
- Successor: Adelaide
- Born: 1028
- Died: 1080 (aged 51–52)
- Noble family: Carolingian dynasty, Herbertine Branch
- Spouse: Adele of Valois
- Issue: Adelaide, Countess of Vermandois Odo I of Saint-Simon Gerard (born 1066)
- Father: Otto of Vermandois
- Mother: Pavia

Herbert IV of Vermandois (1028–1080) was Count of Vermandois. He was the son of Otto of Vermandois and Parvie (also known as Pavia or Patia).

== Family and children ==
Herbert married Adele of Valois, daughter of Ralph IV of Valois and Adele of Bar-sur-Aube. They had the following children:

- Adelaide, Countess of Vermandois (c. 1062 – 23 September 1120), who married first Hugh Magnus, son of Henry I of France and younger brother of Philip I of France, and secondly Renaud II of Clermont-Beauvaisis
- Odo I of Saint-Simon (c. 1064 – after 1085)
- Gerard (born 1066)

After his death in 1080, his son-in-law Hugh Magnus inherited the countships of Vermandois and Valois, ending the direct Carolingian (Herbertine) rule in the region that had continued since 818.

== Sources ==
- Crouch, David (1986). The Beaumont Twins: The Roots and Branches of Power in the Twelfth Century. Cambridge University Press.
- Gabriele, Matthew (2008). "The Provenance of the Descriptio Qualiter Karolus Magnus: Remembering the Carolingians in the entourage of King Philip I (1060–1108) before the First Crusade". Viator. 39 (2). University of California Press: 93–117.
- Le Jan, Régine (2003). Famille et pouvoir dans le monde franc (VIIe–Xe siècle). Publications de la Sorbonne.
- Suger (1992). The Deeds of Louis the Fat. Translated by Cusimano, Richard C.; Moorhead, John. Catholic University of America Press.

| Preceded by Otto | Count of Vermandois; 1045–1080 | Succeeded by Odo I |
