= Crépy-en-Valois =

- Commune
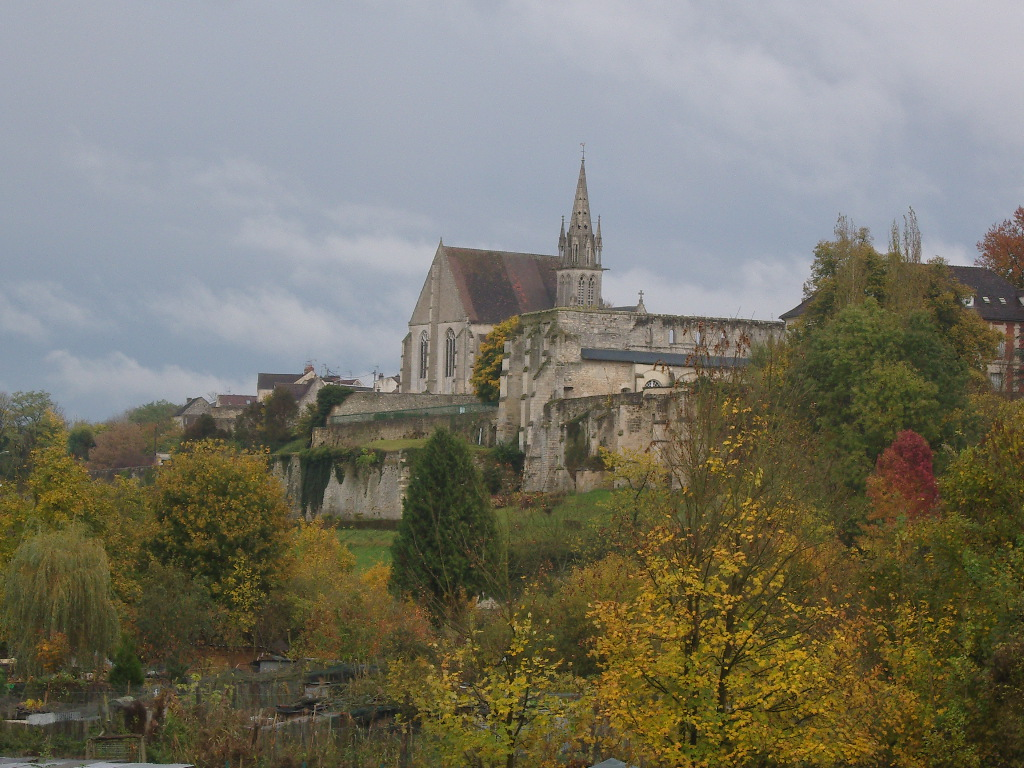
- Church of Saint Denis

- Coat of arms
- Location of Crépy-en-Valois
- Location within France Location within Hauts-de-France
- Coordinates: 49°14′09″N 2°53′24″E
- Country: France
- Region: Hauts-de-France
- Department: Oise
- Arrondissement: Senlis
- Canton: Crépy-en-Valois
- Intercommunality: Pays de Valois

Government
  - Mayor (2021–2026): Virginie Douat
- Area^{1}: 16.28 km^{2} (6.29 sq mi)
- Highest elevation: 150 m (490 ft)
- Lowest elevation: 62 m (203 ft)
- Population (2023): 14,351
  - Density: 881.5/km^{2} (2,283/sq mi)
- Time zone: UTC+01:00 (CET)
  - Summer (DST): UTC+02:00 (CEST)
- INSEE/Postal code: 60176 /
- ^{1} French Land Register data, which excludes lakes, ponds, glaciers > 1 km^{2} (0.386 sq mi or 247 acres) and river estuaries.

Crépy-en-Valois (French pronunciation: [kʁepi ɑ̃ valwa], lit. 'Crépy in Valois') is a commune located in the Oise department in northern France. It is located in the Paris Metropolitan Area, 58 km (36 mi) northeast of the center of Paris.

== History ==
Crépy-en-Valois was founded in the tenth century by the count of Valois and served as the capital of the Valois county and duchy. During the Middle Ages, the city profited from the Champagne fairs, markets for leather, cloth, spices, and other goods. Then, the Valois and the town of Crépy-en-Valois were annexed by the monarchy, and administration was given to a member of the royal family. During the war against the English in fourteenth century, the town was destroyed.

In 1828, Crépy-en-Valois annexed the commune of Bouillant. In 1861, a railway station was built, and the town experienced economic growth.

On 1 September 1914, the 13th Infantry Brigade of 5th Division, part of the British Expeditionary Force, fought a rearguard action here against the advancing German Army, during the Retreat from Mons. The population of the town increased after World War II, because Crépy is located near Paris (64 km or 40 mi).

Crépy-en-Valois was deeply affected by the 1982 Beaune coach crash, in which 44 local children died. Every year since the tragedy, the town hall has held a commemoration on the anniversary date.

== Population ==
Historical population
Year	Pop.	±% p.a.
1968	8,660	—
1975	10,920	+3.37%
1982	12,228	+1.63%
1990	13,222	+0.98%
1999	14,436	+0.98%
2007	14,180	−0.22%
2012	14,514	+0.47%
2017	15,090	+0.78%
2023	14,351	−0.83%
Source: INSEE

== Transport ==
Crépy-en-Valois is served by Crépy-en-Valois station on the Transilien Paris-Nord suburban rail line and on the regional rail line to Laon. Travel by train will take about forty five minutes from Gare du Nord.

== Historic monuments ==
Crépy-en-Valois has a total of thirteen monuments historiques, two classed and eleven inscribed. It had a fourteenth that was destroyed during World War II.

- Priory of Saint-Arnoul, a medieval Cluniac monastery founded by the old counts of Valois, inscribed in 1943 and 1979.
- A collegiate church of Saint Thomas of Canterbury from the 12th century, classed in 1875.
- Château Saint-Aubin, 10th–13th centuries, inscribed 3 April 1926.
- Église Saint-Denis, a 12th-century parish church, inscribed 29 November 1977.
- Église Saint-Martin de Bouillant, a 15th-century parish church, inscribed 23 February 1951.
- Hôtel de la Rose, built in 1537, inscribed 8 February 2001.
- Maison Le Corandon, 16th century, inscribed 7 November 1979.
- A 16th-century house at 18 rue de la Cloche, inscribed 4 August 1978.
- Hôtel Saint-Joseph, from 1649, inscribed 8 May 1933.
- Fond-Marin, a 17th-century hydraulic nymphaeum and laundry, inscribed 14 May 2003.
- Maison Quatre Saisons, façade 1758, inscribed 8 May 1933.
- Hôtel d'Orléans, also called Maison Jeanne d'Arc, a 14th-century house, inscribed 30 March 1978.
- The ruins of the Paris gate, built in 1788–92, classed on 26 May 1951.
- A 13th-century house, 9 rue Nationale, inscribed 8 May, was destroyed in World War II.

== See also ==
- Communes of the Oise department
- Monument aux morts (Oise)
