= List of Aquitanian consorts =

The consorts of Aquitaine were the spouses of the Aquitanian monarchs. They were mostly Duchess but other held the titles Lady or Queen.

== Early Frankish Duchesses ==
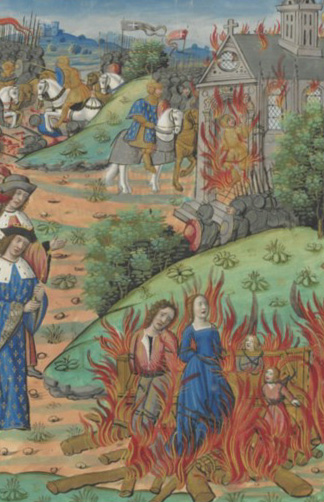
Death of Chramn and his family

- Chalde of Orléans, daughter of Duke/Count Wilichaire, wife of Chram, killed by Chlothar, King of the Franks
- Tetradia, daughter of a noblewoman and a peasant, wife of Desiderius,
- Wife of Eudes, mother of Hunald I, name unknown
- Wife of Hunald I, mother of Waifer, name unknown

== Frankish queen of Aquitaine ==
=== Merovingian dynasty, 629–632 ===
Picture	Name	Father	Birth	Marriage	Became Queen	Ceased to be Queen	Death	Spouse
	Gisela of Gascony?	Amand of Gascony	c. 610	before 629	18 October 629 husband's accession	8 April 632 husband's death	ca. 632	Charibert II
	Fulberte?	?	?	?	?	?	?	Charibert II
Kingdom passed to Neustria and Burgundy in 632; dukes were appointed to Aquitaine

=== Carolingian dynasty, 778–877 ===
Picture	Name	Father	Birth	Marriage	Became Queen	Ceased to be Queen	Death	Spouse
	Ingeltrude of Madrie	Theodobert, Count of Madrie	ca. 803	c. 822		?	c. 838	Pepin I

== Duchess of Aquitaine ==
=== Ramnulfid House of Poitiers (1st time), 852–893 ===
Picture	Name	Father	Birth	Marriage	Became Duchess	Ceased to be Duchess	Death	Spouse
	Bilichild of Maine	Rorgon II, Count of Maine	ca. 812	c. 845	c. 852 husband's accession	c. 866 husband's death	after 866	Ranulf I
Interregnum 866–887
	Ermengard or Ada?	?	c. 882	?	?	?	c. 935	Ranulf II
	Aremburga	?	ca. 879	10 October 891		c. 893 husband's desposition	c. 935	Ebalus

=== House of Auvergne, 893–927 ===
Picture	Name	Father	Birth	Marriage	Became Duchess	Ceased to be Duchess	Death	Spouse
	Engelberga of Provence	Boso of Provence (Bosonids)	?	before 898	c. 893 husband's accession	c. 917		William I
	Gerletta Rolfsdottir		891	?	?	?	14 October 962	William II

=== Ramnulfid House of Poitiers (2nd time), 927–932 ===
Picture	Name	Father	Birth	Marriage	Became Duchess	Ceased to be Duchess	Death	Spouse
	Emilienne	?	?	February 911	c. 927 husband's accession	c. 932 titles transferred		Ebles Manzur

=== House of Rouergue, 932–955 ===
Picture	Name	Father	Birth	Marriage	Became Duchess	Ceased to be Duchess	Death	Spouse
	Garsinda	perhaps García II of Gascony (Gascony)	c. 900		c. 932 husband's accession	c. 936 husband's desposition	c. 972	Raymond I
	Bertha of Arles	Boso, Margrave of Tuscany (Bosonids)	c. 912	c. 936	c. 936 husband's accession	c. 955 husband's desposition	18. August 965	Raymond II

=== Ramnulfid House of Poitiers (3rd time), 962–1189 ===
Picture	Name	Father	Birth	Marriage	Became Duchess	Ceased to be Duchess	Death	Spouse
	Gerloc/Adèle of Normandy	Rollo of Normandy (Normandy)	?	c. 935	935 as claimant duchess 962 husband's accession	14 October 962		William III
	Emma of Blois	Theobald I of Blois (Blois)	c. 955	c. 968		995 husband retired to monastery	1 August 1004	William IV
	Adalemode of Limoges	?	?	c. 997		c. 1006		William V
	Prisca of Gascony	William II, Duke of Gascony (Gascony)	?	c. 1011		c. 1016/1018		William V
	Agnes of Burgundy	Otto-William, Count of Burgundy (Ivrea)	c. 995	c. 1019		31 January 1030 husband's death	10 November 1068	William V
	Eustachie of Montreuil-Bellay	?Berlay III?	?	c. 1031		c. 1038	March 1038	William VI
	Ermesinde	?	?	c. 1041		?	?	William VII
	Garsende of Périgord	Aldabert II, Count of Périgord	?	c. 1044	Autumn 1058 husband's accession	November 1058 divorce	?	William VIII
	Mathilde	perhaps Audebert of La Marche	?	c. 1058/9		May 1068 divorce	?	William VIII
	Hildegarde of Burgundy	Robert I, Duke of Burgundy (Burgundy)	c. 1056	c. 1068/9		25 September 1086 husband's death	1104	William VIII
	Ermengarde of Anjou	Fulk IV, Count of Anjou (Anjou)	c. 1068	c. 1089		c. 1091 marriage dissolved	1 June 1146	William IX
	Philippa of Toulouse	William IV, Count of Toulouse (Rouergue)	c. 1073	c. 1094		c. 1116 retired to the Abbey of Fontevrault	28 November 1118	William IX
	Aénor of Châtellerault	Aimery I, Viscount of Châtellerault (Châtellerault)	c. 1103	c. 1121	10 February 1126 husband's accession	March 1130		William X

=== House of Plantagenet, 1189–1449 ===
Picture	Name	Father	Birth	Marriage	Became Duchess	Ceased to be Duchess	Death	Spouse
	Berengaria of Navarre	Sancho VI of Navarre (Jiménez)	between 1165 and 1170	12 May 1191		6 April 1199 husband's death	23 December 1230	Richard I
	Isabella of Angoulême	Aymer, Count of Angoulême (Taillefer)	c. 1187	24 August 1200		18 or 19 October 1216 husband's death	31 May 1246	John I
	Eleanor of Provence	Ramon Berenguer IV, Count of Provence (Barcelona)	c. 1223	14 January 1236		16 November 1272 husband's death	24 June 1291	Henry II
	Eleanor of Castile	Ferdinand III of Castile (Burgundy-Spain)	c. 1241	1 November 1254	16 November 1272 husband's accession	28 November 1290		Edward I
	Marguerite of France	Philip III of France (Capet)	c. 1282	8 or 10 September 1299		7 July 1307 husband's death	14 February 1317	Edward I
	Isabella of France	Philip IV of France (Capet)	between 1288 and 1296	25 January 1308		31 May 1325 son became duke or 20 January 1327 husband's deposition	22 August 1358	Edward II
	Philippa of Hainault	William I, Count of Hainault (Avesnes)	24 June 1311	24 January 1328		c. 1337 became claimant French queen	15 August 1369	Edward III

== English Occupation ==
The Ducal title of Aquitaine was merged with the English claimed Crown of France, 1337–1360; so Philippa of Hainault, the Queen of Edward III was also the Duchess of Aquitaine

=== Lady of Aquitaine, 1360–1369 ===
Picture	Name	Father	Birth	Marriage	Became Consort	Ceased to be Consort	Death	Spouse
	Philippa of Hainault	William I, Count of Hainault (Avesnes)	24 June 1311	24 January 1328	8 May 1360; Treaty of Brétigny	c. 1369; Treaty broken, war resumed	15 August 1369	Edward III

=== Princess of Aquitaine (royal title), 1362–1372 ===
Picture	Name	Father	Birth	Marriage	Became Princess	Ceased to be Princess	Death	Spouse
	Joan of Kent	Edmund of Woodstock, 1st Earl of Kent (Plantagenet)	29 September 1328	10 October 1361		c. 1372 title merged into crown	7 August 1385	Prince Edward

The Ducal title of Aquitaine was merged again with the English claimed Crown of France, 1369–1390; so Anne of Bohemia, first queen of Richard II was also the Duchess of Aquitaine.

=== Duchess of Aquitaine (under England), 1390–1422 ===
Picture	Name	Father	Birth	Marriage	Became Duchess	Ceased to be Duchess	Death	Spouse
	Constance of Castile	Peter of Castile (Burgundy-Spain)	c. 1354	21 September 1371	c. 1390 created Duchess	24 March 1394		John II
	Katherine de Roet	Payne de Roet	25 November 1350	13 January 1396		3 February 1399 husband's death	10 May 1403	John II

The Ducal title of Aquitaine was merged again with the English claimed Crown of France, 1413–1449; so the English queens: Joanna of Navarre, Catherine of Valois and Margaret of Anjou were also Duchesses of Aquitaine. After the loss of most of Aquitaine to the Valois, the French kings gain completed rights to title that they had taken back from Edward III in 1337.

The Duchy of Aquitaine was reclaimed by the Crown of France in 1337; but it wasn't until 1449 that the Valois kings were able to conquer it from the Plantaganets. The Kings of France granted the title of Duke of Guyenne to their heirs, the Dauphins. The title was used after the fall of the French monarchy by the member of the Bourbon family.

== Duchess of Guyenne ==
=== House of Valois and Bourbon, since 1337 ===
Picture	Name	Father	Birth	Marriage	Became Duchess	Ceased to be Duchess	Death	Spouse
	Bonne of Bohemia	John of Bohemia (Luxembourg)	20 May 1315	6 August 1332	c. 1349 title created	11 September 1349		John II
	Jeanne I of Auvergne	William XII, Count of Auvergne and Boulogne (Auvergne)	8 May 1326	13 February 1349		22 August 1350 became Queen of France	29 September 1360	John II
	Margaret of Burgundy	John the Fearless (Valois-Burgundy)	c. 1393	c. 1403		February 1442 her death	February 1442	Louis, Dauphin of France
Vacant
