= Ramnulfids =

French dynasty

House of Poitiers Ramnulfids
- Arms of the Ramnulfid Count of Poitiers
- Country: France
- Founded: 854; 1170 years ago
- Founder: Ranulf I of Aquitaine
- Final ruler: Aquitaine: Eleanor of Aquitaine Antioch: Bohemond VI of Antioch Tripoli: Lucia, Countess of Tripoli Cyprus: Charlotte, Queen of Cyprus
- Titles: See list: Count of Poitiers; Duke of Aquitaine; Count of Toulouse (Jure uxoris); Prince of Antioch; Count of Tripoli; King of Cilicia (Jure uxoris); King of Cyprus
- Estates: Poitiers, Aquitaine, Antioch, Tripoli, Cyprus
- Dissolution: 1204 (ducal line)
- Cadet branches: House of Poitiers-Antioch; House of Poitiers-Lusignan

The Ramnulfids, or the House of Poitiers, were a French dynasty of Frankish origin ruling the County of Poitou and Duchy of Aquitaine in the 9th through 12th centuries. Their power base shifted from Toulouse to Poitou. In the early 10th century, they contested the dominance of northern Aquitaine and the ducal title to the whole with the House of Auvergne. In 1032, they inherited the Duchy of Gascony, thus uniting it with Aquitaine. By the end of the 11th century, they were the dominant power in the southwestern third of France. The founder of the family was Ramnulf I, who became count in 835.

Ramnulf's son, Ramnulf II, claimed the title of King of Aquitaine in 888, but it did not survive him. Through his illegitimate son Ebalus he fathered the line of dukes of Aquitaine that would rule continuously from 927 to 1204, from the succession of William III to the death of Eleanor, who brought the Ramnulfid inheritance first to Louis VII of France and then to Henry II of England.

Several daughters of this house achieved high status. Adelaide married Hugh Capet and was thus the first Queen of France in the era of the Direct Capetians. Agnes married Henry III, Holy Roman Emperor, and ruled as regent for her son, the young Henry IV. The most illustrious woman was certainly Aquitaine's ruler Eleanor, whose marriage to Henry II of England crafted the Angevin Empire which was to cause so much discord between France and England.

The Ramnulfid house did much to encourage art, literature, and piety. Under William V, William IX, and William X, Aquitaine became the centre for the art of poetry and song in the vernacular; the troubadour tradition was born and raised there. The Peace and Truce of God were fostered and the ideal of courtly love invented.

== Counts of Poitiers and dukes of Aquitaine ==
The House of Poitiers produced many dukes of Aquitaine, who were officially titled counts of Poitiers. This line became extinct in the male-line in 1137, and completely in 1204 with the death of Duchess Eleanor of Aquitaine, who was by her first marriage queen of France and by her second marriage queen of England.

Dates	Dukes	Notes
854–866	Ranulf I of Aquitaine († 866)	Count of Poitiers, son of Gerard, Count of Auvergne.
888–890	Ranulf II of Aquitaine († 890)	Count of Poitiers, son of Ranulf I. He styled himself Duke of Aquitaine after the death of Charles the Fat and rejected the suzerainty of King Odo of France.
893/909–918	William I the Pious († 918)	Kinsman of Ranulf II, Marquis of Gothia, Count of Auvergne, Berry, Macon, Limousin and Lyon. Described as dux in 893, and dux Aquitanorum in 909.
918–926	William II the Young († 926)	Nephew of preceding.
926–927	Acfred († 927)	Brother of preceding. Designated Ebalus as his successor.
927–932	Ebalus the Bastard († 934)	Count of Poitiers, son of Ranulf II. In 932, Rudolph of Burgundy, King of France, took Aquitaine from him to give it to Raymond Pons.
959–963	William III Towhead († 963)	Son of Ebalus. Count of Poitiers, Limousin and Auvergne, called "Count of the Duchy of Aquitaine" or "Count Palatine of Aquitaine", but not "Duke of Aquitaine".
963–995	William IV Iron Arm († 995)	Count of Poitiers, son of preceding.
995–1030	William V the Great († 1030)	Count of Poitiers, son of preceding.
1030–1038	William VI the Fat († 1038)	Count of Poitiers, son of preceding.
1038–1039	Odo of Gascony († 1039)	Count of Gascony from 1032 to 1039, Count of Poitiers, son of William V and half-brother of preceding.
1039–1058	William VII, Duke of Aquitaine († 1058)	Count of Poitiers, son of William V and half-brother of preceding.
1058–1086	William VIII, Duke of Aquitaine († 1086)	Count of Gascony from 1052 to 1086, Count of Poitiers, brother of preceding.
1086–1126	William IX, Duke of Aquitaine († 1126)	Count of Poitiers and Gascony, son of preceding.
1126–1137	William X, Duke of Aquitaine († 1137)	Count of Poitiers and Gascony, son of preceding.
1137–1204	Eleanor of Aquitaine (1122 † 1204)	Countess of Poitiers and Gascony, eldest daughter of preceding, married firstly Louis VII the Young, King of France; the marriage was annulled in 1152, after then she married Henry of Anjou, future King of England.

== Princes of Antioch and counts of Tripoli ==
A branch of the House of Poitiers settled in the Holy Land, founded by Raymond of Poitiers (1115–1149), a younger son of William IX of Aquitaine, from whom descended the last princes of Antioch and counts of Tripoli.

- 1163–1201: Bohemond III († 1201), prince of Antioch, son of Raymond of Poitiers and Constance of Antioch
- 1201–1216: Bohemond IV (1172 † 1233), prince of Antioch and count of Tripoli, second son of Bohemond III and Orgueilleuse of Harenc
- 1216–1219: Raymond-Roupen (1199 † 1221), son of Raymond IV, Count of Tripoli, (eldest son of Bohemond III and Orgueilleuse of Harenc) and Alice of Armenia
- 1219–1233: Bohemond IV, restored
- 1233–1252: Bohemond V († 1252), prince of Antioch and count of Tripoli, son of Bohemond IV and Plaisance of Gibelet
- 1252–1268: Bohemond VI the Fair (1237 † 1275), prince of Antioch and count of Tripoli, son of Bohemond V and Luciana de Caccamo-Segni. The city of Antioch was definitively lost in 1268, but Bohemond VI retained the title of Prince of Antioch until his death and passed it on to his descendants in the House of Poitiers.
- 1275–1287: Bohemond VII († 1287), prince of Antioch and count of Tripoli, son of preceding
- 1287–1299: Lucia († 1299), princess of Antioch and countess of Tripoli, sister of preceding, married Narjot de Toucy, a Sicilian admiral.
Arms of Poitiers-Antioch

Before 1252

After 1252

== Kings of Cyprus ==
Henry of Antioch (d. 1276), son of Bohemond IV of Antioch, married Isabella of Lusignan (d. 1264), heiress of the kingdom of Cyprus, and thus founded the second House of Lusignan. The lineage of the House of Poitiers became extinct in 1487 with the death of Queen Charlotte of Cyprus.

- 1267–1284: Hugh III (1235 † 1284), King of Cyprus and Jerusalem, son of Henry of Antioch and Isabella of Lusignan.
- 1284–1285: John II (1267 † 1285), King of Cyprus and Jerusalem, son of Hugues III and of Isabella of Ibelin.
- 1285–1306: Henry II (1271 † 1324), King of Cyprus, son of Hugues III and of Isabelle of Ibelin.
- 1306–1310: Amalric, Lord of Tyre (1272 † 1310), governor of Cyprus, son of Hugh III and of Isabella of Ibelin.
- 1310–1324: Henry II of Jerusalem.
- 1324–1359: Hugh IV (1295 † 1359), King of Cyprus, son of Guy of Cyprus (son of Hugh III and Isabella of Ibelin) and of Echive of Ibelin.
- 1359–1369: Peter I (1328 † 1369), King of Cyprus, son of Hugh IV and of Alix of Ibelin.
- 1369–1382: Peter II (1357 † 1382), King of Cyprus, son of Peter I and of Eleanor of Aragon.
- 1382–1398: James I (1334 † 1398), King of Cyprus, son of Hugh IV and of Alix of Ibelin.
- 1398–1432: Janus (1375 † 1432), King of Cyprus, son of James I and of Helvis of Brunswick-Grubenhagen.
- 1432–1458: John II (1418 † 1458), King of Cyprus, son of Janus and Charlotte de Bourbon.
- 1458–1464: Charlotte (1442 † 1487), Queen of Cyprus, daughter of John II and of Helena Palaiologina.
- 1464–1473: James II, the Bastard (1418 † 1473), King of Cyprus, illegitimate son of John II and Marietta de Patras.
- 1473–1474: James III, the Posthumous (1473 † 1474), son of James II and Catherine Cornaro.
Arms of Poitiers-Lusignan

Kings of Jerusalem and Cyprus

Poitiers as Kings of Jerusalem, Cyprus and Armenia

Kings of Armenia, Jerusalem, Cyprus

== Genealogy ==
=== House of Poitiers ===
- Ranulf I of Aquitaine
  - Ranulf II of Aquitaine
    - Ranulf III of Aquitaine
    - Ebalus, Duke of Aquitaine (illegitimate)
      - William III, Duke of Aquitaine
        - William IV, Duke of Aquitaine
          - William V, Duke of Aquitaine
            - William VI, Duke of Aquitaine
            - Odo of Gascony
            - Theobald
            - Peter William, later William VII, Duke of Aquitaine
            - Guy Geoffrey, later William VIII, Duke of Aquitaine
              - William IX, Duke of Aquitaine
                - William X, Duke of Aquitaine
                  - Eleanor of Aquitaine
                  - William Aigret
                - Raymond of Poitiers, Prince of Antioch
                  - House of Poitiers-Antioch
              - Hugh
          - Ebles
      - Ebalus, Bishop of Limoges and Treasurer of St. Hilary of Poitiers
  - Gauzbert
  - Ebalus, Chancellor of France

=== House of Poitiers-Antioch ===
- Raymond of Poitiers, Prince of Antioch
  - Bohemond III of Antioch
    - Raymond IV, Count of Tripoli
      - Raymond-Roupen
    - Bohemond IV of Antioch
      - Raimond de Poitiers, Bailiff of Antioch
      - Bohemond V of Antioch
        - Bohemond VI of Antioch
          - Bohemond VII, Count of Tripoli
      - Henry of Antioch
        - House of Poitiers-Lusignan
    - Manuel de Poitiers
    - Guillaume de Poitiers
    - Bohemond de Poitiers, Lord Consort of Boutron
      - Jean de Boutron
      - Guillaume de Boutron, Lord of Boutron, Constable of Jerusalem
        - Jean de Boutron, Lord of Boutron
      - Jacques de Boutron
        - Rostain de Boutron, Lord of Boutron
        - Guillaume de Boutron
  - Baldwin
  - Raymond

=== House of Poitiers-Lusignan ===
- Henry of Antioch
  - Hugh III of Cyprus
    - John I of Cyprus
    - Bohemond of Lusignan
    - Henry II of Jerusalem
    - Amalric, Lord of Tyre
      - Hugh of Lusignan, Lord of Crusoche
      - Henry of Lusignan
      - Guy of Lusignan, later Constantine II, King of Armenia
      - John of Lusignan, Constable and Regent of Cilicia
        - Bohemond of Lusignan
        - Leo V, King of Armenia (illegitimate)
      - Bohemond of Lusignan
        - Barthelemy of Lusignan, Co-Regent of Armenia (illegitimate)
    - Aimery of Lusignan, Constable of Cyprus
    - Guy of Lusignan
      - Hugh IV of Cyprus
        - Guy of Lusignan, Constable of Cyprus and Titular Prince of Galilee
          - Hugh of Lusignan, Titular Prince of Galilee, Senator of Rome
        - Peter I of Cyprus
          - Peter II of Cyprus
        - John of Lusignan
          - James of Lusignan, Titular Count of Tripoli
            - John of Lusignan, Titular Count of Tripoli
            - Peter of Lusignan, Titular Count of Tripoli
              - Phoebus of Lusignan, Titular Marshal of Armenia and Titular Lord of Sidon (illegitimate)
          - John of Lusignan, Titular Lord of Beirut (illegitimate)
            - John of Lusignan, Titular Lord of Beirut (illegitimate)
        - James I of Cyprus
          - Janus of Cyprus
            - James of Lusignan
            - John II of Cyprus
              - Charlotte, Queen of Cyprus
              - James II of Cyprus (illegitimate)
                - James III of Cyprus
          - Philip of Lusignan, Constable of Cyprus
            - Lancelot of Lusignan, Cardinal, Latin Patriarch of Jerusalem (illegitimate)
          - Henry of Lusignan, Titular Prince of Galilee
            - Illegitimate line (extinct 1660)
          - Odo of Lusignan, Titular Seneschal of Jerusalem
          - Hugues Lancelot de Lusignan, Cardinal Archbishop of Nicosia
          - Guy of Lusignan, Constable of Cyprus
        - Thomas of Cyprus

== See also ==
- Dukes of Aquitaine family tree
