= Austrovald =

Austrovald, Astrobald, and Austrevald (died 607) was the Duke of Aquitaine from 587.

Austrovald was probably a count of Toulouse until that year, when he was appointed to succeed the dux Desiderius in Aquitaine, by King Guntram.

Under Chilperic I and then the usurper Gundoald, a dux named Bladast was acting as duke over the region of Aquitaine. The dux Austrovald was sent in 587 to pacify the Basques of Vasconia, a difficult enterprise in which he was none too successful, for he lost many men to captivity and the Basques are found as far as the Garonne by 602. Bordeaux probably formed the chief fortified frontier city of Austrovald's watch. It is probable that the Basques were forced to pay tribute, but left under their own laws. It is out of this that a separate Gascon duchy was created in 602, probably within Aquitaine.

In 589, Austrovald held command of the forces of Périgueux, Agen, Saintes, and Bordeaux, when he invaded Septimania. Twice he marched on Visigothic Carcassonne but failed to take it.

Austrovald was succeeded by Sereus after a short reign.

== Sources ==
- Higounet, Charles. Bordeaux pendant le haut moyen age. Bordeaux, 1963.
- Gregory of Tours. Historia Francorum. translated Earnest Brehaut, 1916.
- Wallace-Hadrill, J. M., translator. The Fourth Book of the Chronicle of Fredegar with its Continuations. Greenwood Press: Connecticut, 1960.
- Collins, Roger. The Basques. Blackwell Publishing: London, 1990.
- Sedycias, João. História da Língua Espanhola.
- Lewis, Archibald R. "The Dukes in the Regnum Francorum, A.D. 550-751." Speculum, Vol. 51, No 3 (July 1976), pp 381–410
- Monlezun, Jean Justin. Histoire de la Gascogne. 1864.

.
