= Acfred, Duke of Aquitaine =

Duke of Aquitaine

Acfred (died 927) was briefly Count of Auvergne and Duke of Aquitaine between 926 and his death, succeeding his brother William II. Acfred was the youngest son of the count Acfred I of Carcassonne and Adelinda, sister of William I of Aquitaine. He was the last direct heir of his house. His title of "duke" only appears in a posthumous charter of 928.

Acfred possessed very little land in Auvergne, most of it having been transformed into allods of the leading men long before. Based on surviving charters, he did not control the Lyonnais or the Velay, though he held some property in the latter. His other property was scattered throughout the Auvergne and Gévaudan. He did, however, possess a few comital castles. When Acfred drew up a will in 927, he granted away all that remained of the comital fisc to his retainers.

Though Adhemar of Chabannes called Ebalus Manzer his successor, no contemporary documents evidence Ebalus in Auvergne, though he certainly had a claim to it. Ebalus, however, was not the only claimant. Between 940 and 941, Raymond Pons of Toulouse controlled the region, and, in 955, William III of Aquitaine invaded and held it.

== See also ==
- Dukes of Aquitaine family tree

== Notes ==
Preceded by William II	Duke of Aquitaine; 926–927	Succeeded by Ebalus
Preceded by William II	Count of Auvergne; 926–927	Succeeded by Ebalus
