= Ebles Manzer =

Duke of Aquitaine

Ebalus, Duke of Aquitaine
- Born: c. 870
- Died: 935
- Noble family: House of Poitiers
- Spouses: Aremburga; Emilienne; Adele
- Issue: William III of Aquitaine
- Father: Ranulf II of Aquitaine
- Mother: ?

Ebalus, or Ebles Manzer, or Manser (c. 870 – 935), was Count of Poitou and Duke of Aquitaine on two occasions: from 890 to 892; and then from 902 until his death in 935 (Poitou) and from 928 until 932 (Aquitaine).

== Early life ==
Ebles was an illegitimate son of Ranulf II of Aquitaine. "Manzer", or "Mamzer", is a Hebrew word that means bastard, son of a forbidden relationship.

== Count of Poitou ==
Upon the death of his father (who was poisoned), Ebles assumed his father's mantle and acquired the role of Count of Poitou. But Ebles could not hold on to the title for long. Aymar, a descendant of one of Ranulf II's predecessors, challenged Ebles' right to rule, as Ebles was merely a bastard son. In 892, Aymar, who was supported by Eudes of France, overthrew Ebles, and Ebles fled to the safety of his father's allies, Count Gerald of Aurillac and William the Pious, count of Auvergne and Duke of Aquitaine. William the Pious had taken Ebles under his care and assured the boy's education after the death of Ebles' father.

In 902, Ebles, with the assistance of William the Pious, a distant relative, conquered Poitiers while Aymar was away, and reestablished himself in his former position. Charles III, who knew Ebles as a childhood companion, then formally invested Ebles with the title, Count of Poitou. Ebles would hold this title until his death.

The comital title was the only one to which he ever had legitimate investiture. Ebles allotted the abbey of Saint-Maixent to Savary, Viscount of Thouars, who had been his constant supporter. He restructured Poitou by creating new viscounties in Aulnay and Melle and dissolved the title and position of Viscount of Poitou upon the death of its holder, Maingaud, in 925.

In 904, he conquered the Limousin.

== French commanders ==
In 911 he, with two other French commanders were aligned in opposition to Rollo (future founder of Normandy), who had plundered the Northern French countryside. Ebles and the other two commanders intended to lead their armies in defense of the city of Chartres. Part of Rollo's army camped on a hill (Mount-Levis) north of the city, while the rest were stationed on the plains outside Chartres.

== Battle ==
On 20 July 911, the battle between the French and Danish armies commenced. "Rollo and his forces were shamefully routed, smitten, as the legend tells, with corporeal blindness. A panic assuredly fell upon the heroic commander, a species of mental infirmity discernible in his descendants: the contagious terror unnerved the host. Unpursued, they dispersed and fled without resistance." At the end of the day, 6,800 Danes lay dead on the field of battle.

Ebles was somewhat slow in arriving at Chartres, so he was unable to "take his due share in the conflict." His victorious partners proudly boasted of their success, and mocked Ebles and his tardy army. To redeem his honor and quiet the ridicule, Ebles accepted a challenge to confront the remnant of the Danish army that remained camped on the Mont-Levis. But instead of driving the Danes away, Ebles' army was defeated soundly. "In the dark of the night, the Northmen, sounding their horns and making a terrible clamour, rushed down the mount and stormed" Ebles camp. Ebles fled and hid in a drum in a fuller's workshop. His cowardice and dishonor was derided in a popular French ballad of the Plantagenet age.

== Duke of Aquitaine ==
When Ebles' benefactor, William the Pious, died, William was succeeded as Duke of Aquitaine by William the Younger. In 927, William the Younger died, and he left his title to his brother Acfred; but Acfred did not live even a year. Acfred made Ebles his heir, and in 928 Ebles assumed the titles Duke of Aquitaine, Count of Berry, Count of Auvergne, and Velay.

In 929, King Rudolph started trying to reduce the power of Ebles. He withdrew from him access to Berry, then in 932 he transferred the titles of Duke of Aquitaine and Count of Auvergne to the Count of Toulouse, Raymond Pons. Moreover, the territory of La Marche, which was under the control of the lord of Charroux, vassal of Ebles, was transformed into an independent county.

== Marriage and issue ==
Ebles' first wife was Aremburga, whom he married before 10 October 892. His second wife was Emilienne, whom he married in 911. Following Emilienne's death in 913/915, Ebles remarried to an Adele. Some 19th-century English historians identified Adele with Ælfgifu, daughter of Edward the Elder, known to have married "a prince near the Alps", but there is nothing to support this identification. She has also been called Adela, Alaine, or Aliana.

Ebalus had one child by Emilienne, and another one by Adele:

- William III of Aquitaine married Gerloc, daughter of Rollo of Normandy
- Ebalus, Bishop of Limoges and Treasurer of St. Hilary of Poitiers.

== See also ==
- Dukes of Aquitaine

Ebles Manzer House of Poitou Born: 870 Died: 935
French nobility
Preceded by Acfred	Duke of Aquitaine; 928–932	Succeeded by William III
Preceded by Robert I	Count of Poitiers; 902–935	Succeeded by William III
