= Duchy of Aquitaine =

Medieval duchy in southern France

Duchy of Aquitaine Ducat d'Aquitània (Occitan) Duché d'Aquitaine (French)
- 507–1453
- Flag Angevin coat of arms (12th century)

- Map of France in 1154. The pink area in lower France under Eleanor of Aquitaine and her husband Henry II of England.
- Status: Part of Francia (507–602); Fief of Francia, later France (602 – late 7th century; 769–1453); Independent duchy (late 7th century – 769)
- Common languages: Medieval Latin; Old Gallo-Romance; Old Occitan; Old French; Occitan; Middle French; Poitevin–Saintongeais; Basque
- Religion: Christianity
- Government: Feudal monarchy
- Duke of Aquitaine
  - 507–511: Clovis I
  - 860–866: Ranulf I of Aquitaine
  - 1058–1086: William VIII of Aquitaine
  - 1126–1137: William X of Aquitaine
  - 1137–1204: Eleanor of Aquitaine
  - 1422–1453: Henry VI of England
- Historical era: Middle Ages
  - Battle of Vouillé: 507
  - Annexed by the Kingdom of France: 1453
Preceded by	Succeeded by
Visigothic Kingdom	Duchy of Guyenne; Kingdom of France
- Today part of: France

The Duchy of Aquitaine (Occitan: Ducat d'Aquitània, IPA: [dyˈkad dakiˈtanjɔ]; French: Duché d'Aquitaine, IPA: [dyʃe dakitɛn]) was a historical fiefdom located in the western, central, and southern areas of present-day France, south of the river Loire. The full extent of the duchy, as well as its name, fluctuated greatly over the centuries and at times comprised much of what is now southwestern (including Gascony) and central France.

The territory originated in 507 as a constituent kingdom of Francia after the Salian Franks conquered Aquitaine following the Battle of Vouillé; its boundaries were ultimately a combination of the Roman provinces of Aquitania Prima and Secunda. As a duchy, it broke up after the conquest of the independent Aquitanian duchy of Waiofar, going on to become a sub-kingdom within the Carolingian Empire. It was then absorbed by West Francia after the partition of Verdun in 843 and soon reappeared as a duchy under West Francia. In 1153, an enlarged Aquitaine pledged loyalty to the Angevin kings of England. As a result, a rivalry emerged between the French monarchs and the Angevins over control of the latter's territorial possessions in France. By the mid-13th century, only an enlarged Guyenne and Gascony remained in Angevin hands. The Hundred Years' War finally saw the Kingdom of France gain full control over Aquitaine in 1453 with much of its territory directly incorporated into the French royal domain itself.

== History ==
=== Early history ===
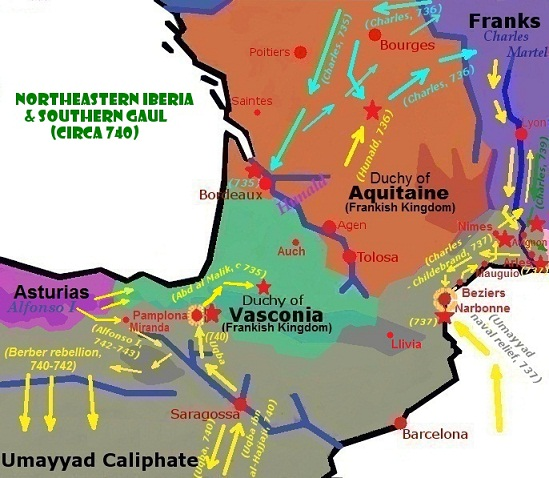
Aquitaine after the Battle of Poitiers (734–743)

Gallia Aquitania fell under Visigothic rule in the 5th century. It was conquered by the Franks under Clovis I in 507, as a result of the Battle of Vouillé. During the 6th and early 7th century, it was under direct rule of Frankish kings, divided between the realms of Childebert II and Guntram in the Treaty of Andelot of 587. Under Chlothar II, Aquitaine was again an integral part of Francia, but after Chlothar's death in 629, his heir Dagobert I granted a subkingdom in southern Aquitaine to his younger brother Charibert II. This subkingdom, consisting of Gascony and the southern fringe of Aquitaine proper, is conventionally known as "Aquitaine" and forms the historical basis for the later duchy. Charibert campaigned successfully against the Basques, but after his death in 632, they revolted again, in 635 subdued by an army sent by Dagobert (who was at the same time forced to deal with a rebellion in Brittany).

The duchy of Aquitaine established itself as a quasi-independent realm within the Frankish empire during the second half of the 7th century, certainly by 700 under Odo the Great. The first duke is on record under the name of Felix, and as having ruled from about 660. As his successor, Lupus held loose ties with the Frankish kings, ruling autonomously (princeps). Odo succeeded Lupus in 700 and signed a peace treaty with Charles Martel. He inflicted on the Moors a crushing defeat at the Battle of Toulouse in 721.

However, Charles Martel coveted the southern realm, crossed the Loire in 731 and looted much of Aquitaine. Odo engaged the Franks in battle, but lost and came out weakened. Soon after this battle, in 732, the Moors raided Vasconia and Aquitaine as far north as Poitiers and defeated Odo twice near Bordeaux. Odo saw no option but to invoke the aid of Charles Martel and pledge allegiance to the Frankish prince.

Odo was succeeded by his son Hunald, who reverted to former independence, so defying the Frankish Mayor of the Palace Charles Martel's authority. In 735 and 736 Martel attacked Hunald and his allies, the counts of key Aquitanian towns such as Bourges and Limoges. Eventually Hunald retired to a monastery, leaving both the kingdom and the continuing conflict to Waifer, or Guaifer. Following the full occupation of Septimania in 759, Pepin turned now his attention to Aquitaine, initiating a cyclical military campaign that lasted for eight years, i.e. the War of Aquitaine. Waifer strenuously carried on an unequal struggle with the Carolingian Franks, but his assassination in 768 marked the demise of Aquitaine's relative independence. During these years Aquitaine underwent intensive destruction of urban, economic, military, and intellectual centres. Pepin's forces destroyed up to 36 monasteries.

As a successor state to the Roman province of Gallia Aquitania and the Visigothic Kingdom (418–721), Aquitania (Aquitaine) and Languedoc (Toulouse) inherited the Visigothic law and Roman law which had combined to allow women more rights than their contemporaries in other parts of Europe. Particularly with the Liber Judiciorum, which was codified in 642 and 643 and expanded in the Code of Recceswinth in 653, women could inherit land and title and manage it independently from their husbands or male relations, dispose of their property in legal wills if they had no heirs, and women could represent themselves and bear witness in court by age 14 and arrange for their own marriages by age 20. As a consequence, male-preference primogeniture was the practiced succession law for the nobility.

=== Carolingian kingdom of Aquitaine ===
The autonomous and troublesome duchy of Aquitaine was conquered by the Franks in 769, after a series of revolts against their suzerainty. In order to avoid a new demonstration of Aquitain particularism, Charlemagne decided to organize the land within his kingdom.

After the Carolingian conquest, the duchy ceased to exist as such, whose powers were taken over by the counts (dukes) of Toulouse, main seat of the Carolingian government in the Midi, represented by Chorso and, after being deposed, by Charlemagne's trustee William (of Gellone), a close relative of Charlemagne. In 781, Charlemagne made his third son Louis, then three years of age, king of Aquitaine. The Carolingian kingdom of Aquitaine subordinated to the Carolingian king or (later) emperor based in Francia (Austrasia, Neustria). It included not only Aquitaine proper, but also Gothia, Vasconia (Gascony) and the Carolingian possessions in Spain as well. In 806, Charlemagne planned to divide his empire between his sons. Louis received Provence and Burgundy as additions to his kingdom.

When Louis succeeded Charlemagne as emperor in 814, he granted Aquitaine to his son Pepin I, after whose death in 838 the nobility of Aquitaine chose his son Pepin II of Aquitaine (d. 865) as their king. The emperor Louis I, however, opposed this arrangement and gave the kingdom to his youngest son Charles, afterwards the emperor Charles the Bald. Confusion and conflict resulted, eventually falling in favor of Charles; although from 845 to 852 Pepin II was in possession of the kingdom, at Eastertide 848 in Limoges, the magnates and prelates of Aquitaine formally elected Charles as their king. Later, at Orléans, he was anointed and crowned by Wenilo, archbishop of Sens. In 852, Pepin II was imprisoned by Charles the Bald, who soon afterwards pronounced his own son Charles as the ruler of Aquitaine. On the death of the younger Charles in 866, his brother Louis the Stammerer succeeded to the kingdom, and when, in 877, Louis became king of the Franks, Aquitaine was fully absorbed into the Frankish crown.

By a treaty made in 845 between Charles the Bald and Pepin II, the kingdom had been diminished by the loss of Poitou, Saintonge, and Angoumois in the northwest of the region, which had been given to Rainulf I, count of Poitiers. The title of Duke of Aquitaine, already revived, was now borne by Rainulf, although it was also claimed by the counts of Toulouse. The new Duchy of Aquitaine, including the three districts already mentioned, remained in the hands of Rainulf's successors, despite disagreement with their Frankish overlords, until 893 when Count Rainulf II was poisoned by order of King Charles III, or Charles the Simple. Charles then bestowed the duchy upon William the Pious, count of Auvergne, the founder of the abbey of Cluny, who was succeeded in 918 by his nephew, Count William II, who died in 926.

A succession of dukes followed, one of whom, William IV, fought against Hugh Capet, king of France, and another of whom, William V, called the Great, was able to strengthen and extend his authority considerably, although he yielded the proffered Lombard crown rather than fight Conrad II for it. William's duchy almost reached the limits of the old Roman Gallia Aquitania but did not stretch south of the Garonne, a district which was in the possession of the Gascons. William died in 1030. Odo or Eudes (d. 1039) joined Gascony to Aquitaine.

=== Personal union with England ===
==== Angevin Empire ====
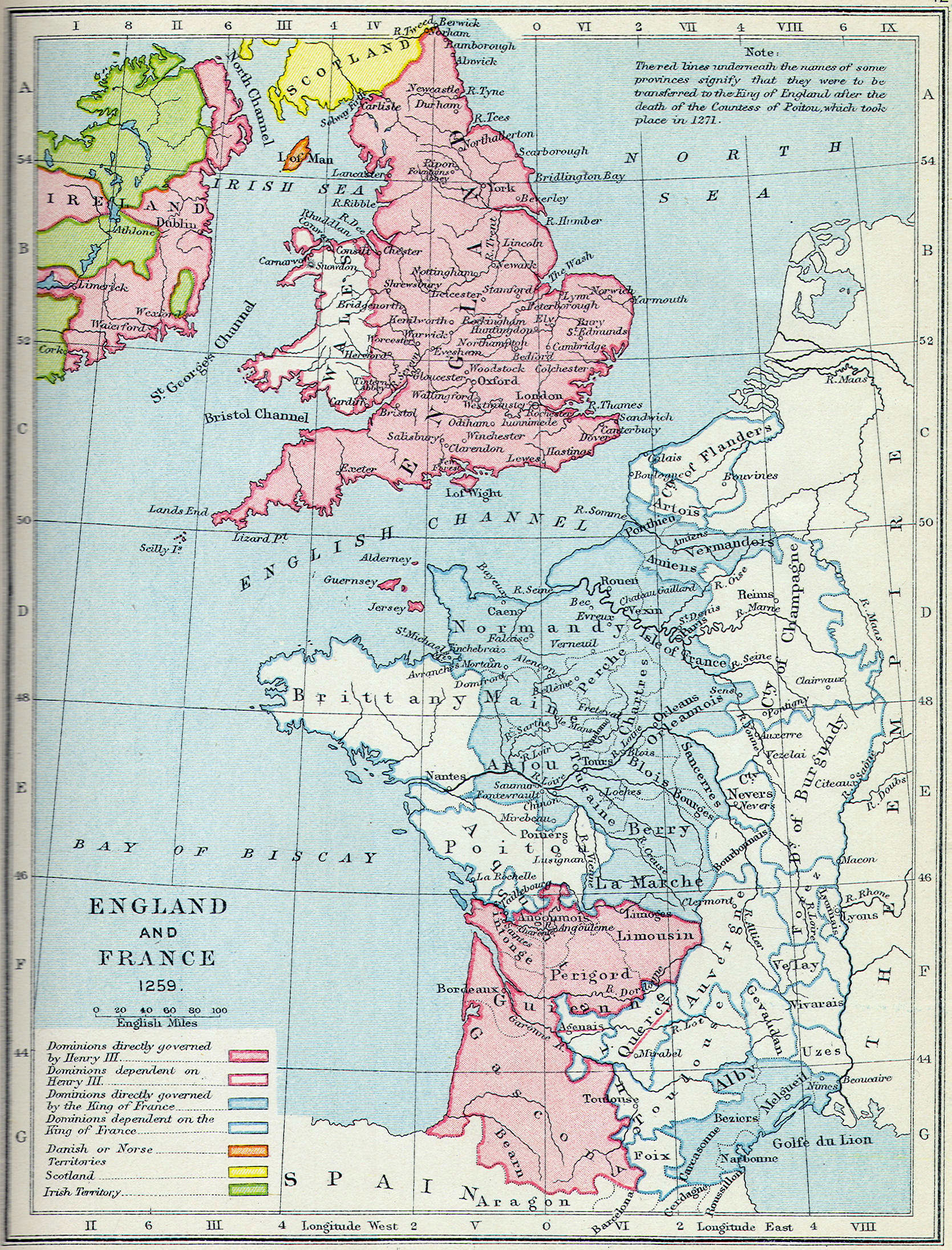
England and France in 1259 and after 1271

The Ramnulfids had become the dominant power in southwestern France by the end of the 11th century. By marriage rather than conquest, their possessions passed into the "Angevin Empire" under the Plantagenet dynasty by 1153.

William IX, Duke of Aquitaine (d. 1127), who succeeded to the dukedom in 1087, gained fame as a crusader and a troubadour. His granddaughter, Eleanor of Aquitaine, succeeded to the duchy at the age of 15 as the eldest daughter and heir of William X (d. 1137), as his son did not live past childhood. She married Louis, heir to the French throne, three months after her father's death due to the quick thinking of Louis's father, Louis VI of France, who did not want to leave a territory such as Aquitaine governed by a child of fifteen. When Louis VI died, and Eleanor's new husband became King Louis VII, the duchy of Aquitaine officially came under the rule of the French Crown, and for fifteen years, Louis VII had territory that rivaled that of the English crown and the counts of Toulouse. The marriage was later annulled on the grounds of consanguinity by a bishop on 21 March 1152, and she kept her lands and title as Duchess of Aquitaine in her own right. On 18 May 1152, she married Henry, Duke of Normandy, the son of Empress Matilda, daughter of Henry I of England, and a claimant to the English throne. When he defeated his mother's cousin, King Stephen, in 1153 and became King of England as Henry II, Aquitaine became part of his "Angevin Empire".

Having suppressed a revolt in his new possession, Henry gave it to his son Richard. When Richard died in 1199, it reverted to Eleanor, and on her death in 1204, it was inherited by her son John. The duchy was henceforward in personal union with England and followed the fortunes of the other English possessions in France, such as Normandy and Anjou, ultimately leading to the Hundred Years' War between England and France.

Aquitaine as it came to the English kings stretched from the Loire to the Pyrenees, but its range was limited to the southeast by the extensive lands of the counts of Toulouse. The name Guienne, a corruption of Aquitaine, seems to have come into use about the 10th century, and the subsequent history of Aquitaine is merged in that of Gascony and Guienne.

==== Hundred Years' War ====
Hundred Years' War evolution. French territory English Burgundian

In 1337, King Philip VI of France reclaimed the fief of Aquitaine (essentially corresponding to Gascony) from Eleanor's descendant, Edward III of England. Edward in turn claimed the entire Kingdom of France as the only grandson of King Philip IV of France. This triggered the Hundred Years' War, in which both the Plantagenets and the House of Valois claimed supremacy over Aquitaine. In 1360, both sides signed the Treaty of Brétigny, in which Edward renounced his claim to the French crown but remained sovereign lord of Aquitaine (rather than merely duke). However, when the treaty was broken in 1369, both these English claims and the war resumed. In 1362, Edward III, as Lord of Aquitaine, made his eldest son Edward the Black Prince, Prince of Aquitaine. In 1390, King Richard II, son of Edward the Black Prince, appointed his uncle John of Gaunt as Duke of Aquitaine. That title passed on to John's descendants although they belonged to the crown because John of Gaunt's son, Henry IV, managed to successfully usurp the crown from Richard II, therefore 'inheriting' the title Lord of Aquitaine from his father, which was passed down to his descendants as they became Kings. His son, Henry V of England, ruled over Aquitaine as King of England and Lord of Aquitaine from 1413 to 1422. He invaded France and emerged victorious at the Siege of Harfleur and the Battle of Agincourt in 1415. He succeeded in obtaining the French crown for his family by the Treaty of Troyes in 1420. Henry V died in 1422, and his son Henry VI inherited the French throne at the age of less than a year; his reign saw the gradual loss of English control of France.

The Valois kings of France, claiming supremacy over Aquitaine, granted the title of duke to their heirs, the Dauphins, during 1345 and 1415: John II (1345–50), Charles VII (1392?–1401), and Louis (1401–1415). French victory was complete with the Battle of Castillon of 1453. England and France nominally remained at war for another 20 years, but England was in no position to continue its campaign, due to its escalating internal conflicts. The Hundred Years' War was formally concluded with the Treaty of Picquigny of 1475. With the end of the Hundred Years' War, Aquitaine returned under direct rule of the king of France and remained in the possession of the king. Only occasionally was the title of "Duke of Aquitaine" granted to another member of the dynasty, and then as a purely nominal distinction.

== Geography and subdivisions ==
Map of France in 1030

Over the course of its existence, the duchy incorporated the Duchy of Gascony and, until 1271, the County of Toulouse, which now falls in the region of Occitanie. Most of the rest of the post-1271 duchy now forms the region of Nouvelle-Aquitaine, though parts fall into the three neighbouring regions of Pays de la Loire, Centre-Val de Loire, and Auvergne-Rhône-Alpes.

The county of Aquitaine as it stood in the High Middle Ages, then, was bordering the Pyrenees to the south (Navarre, Aragon and Barcelona, formerly the Marcha Hispanica) and the county of Toulouse and the Kingdom of Burgundy (Arelat to the east. To the north, it bordered on Bretagne, Anjou, Blois and Bourbonnais, all of which had passed to the Kingdom of France by the 13th century.

- Aquitaine proper
  - County of Poitou
  - County of La Marche
  - County of Angoulême
  - County of Périgord
  - County of Auvergne (passed to the royal domain in 1271)
    - County of Velay
  - County of Saintonge
  - Lordship of Déols
  - Lordship of Issoudun
  - Viscounty of Limousin
- Duchy of Gascony, personal union with Aquitaine from the 7th to the 9th century (Felix of Aquitaine) and again from 1053.
  - County of Agenais
- County of Toulouse (quasi-independent from 778, reverted to the royal domain in 1271)
  - County of Quercy
  - County of Rouergue
    - County of Rodez
  - County of Gevaudan
  - Viscounty of Albi
  - Marquisat of Gothia

== See also ==
- Duke of Aquitaine
- History of Aquitaine

== Bibliography ==
- Lewis, Archibald R. "The Dukes in the Regnum Francorum, A.D. 550-751." Speculum, Vol. 51, No. 3. (July 1976), pp. 381–410.
- Emile Mabille, (1870) Le Royaume D'Aquitaine Et Ses Marches Sous Les Carlovingiens
- Jean Penant, (2009) Occitanie, l'épopée des origines
