= Aymar I of Angoulême =

Count of Poitiers and Angoulême

Aymar or Adémar (died 2 April 926) was Count of Poitiers from 890 to 902 and Count of Angoulême from 916 to 926.

== Biography ==
He was the son of Emenon, Count of Poitiers, and a Robertian mother, probably the daughter of Count Odo I of Troyes.

His father was killed in 866 during a fight against his relative Landri, Count of Saintes, and his two sons Aymar and Adalelm were too young to ensure the defense and management of Angoulême and Périgueux, which were the strongholds of Emenon. King Charles the Bald then entrusted the counties and guardianship of the two children to Count Wulgrin in 869.

The cousin of King Odo, Aymar appeared at court in 889 at the head of a detachment to join the King's host and fight a new Viking incursion. In 890, Ramnulf II, Duke of Aquitaine and Count of Poitiers, died in Paris, leaving his county to his son Ebles Manzer, still a child, under the care of Géraud d'Aurillac. Ramnulf had been one of the Aquitainian lords not to recognize the election of Odo as King and only accepted it a year later; thus Odo sought to take advantage of the death of Ramnulf to install his brother Robert, Margrave of Neustria, there. Not wanting to intervene directly, he encouraged his relative Aymar to attack Géraud and Ebles whilst entrusting him with the royal army. At the head of this army, Aymar took Poitiers in September 892 and forced Géraud and Ebles to take refuge in Auvergne. Ebles' two uncles, Gauzbert, Count of Saintonge, and Ebles, Abbot of Saint-Denis and of the abbey of Saint-Hilaire de Poitiers, were killed in the ensuing fighting.

Once Aymar controlled the county of Poitiers, Odo took away the county and gave it to Robert. Taking advantage of Robert's absence, Aymar surprised the garrison left by Robert and retook the city and county. The Robertians could not fight him, however, because they had learned of the coronation of the Carolingian Prince Charles the Simple as sole king.

Odo died in 898 and Aymar was one of the first lords to recognize Charles the Simple as king. The latter recognized Aymar as Count of Poitiers and made him Count of Limousin and yet was a childhood friend of Ebles Manzer. With the support of Duke William I of Aquitaine and the neutrality of the king, and taking advantage of Aymar's absence, Ebles seized Poitiers in 902 and became its Count with Aymar fleeing to Count William I of Perigord, his brother-in-law.

In 916, Alduin, Count of Angoulême, the brother of William I of Perigord, died, and the guardianship of his son William was entrusted to Aymar, who thus became Count of Angoulême. He died ten years later in 926.

== Family ==
He married Sancia, sister of William I of Perigord. No known children were born from this marriage. Sancia was the victim of an assassination attempt in 918 by the Viscount of Marcillac Lambert, and his brother Arnaud, for which they were executed.
