= William IV of Aquitaine =

Duke of Aquitaine from 963 to 990

William IV

Duke of Aquitaine and Count of Poitou
- Reign: 963–990
- Predecessor: William III, Duke of Aquitaine
- Successor: William V, Duke of Aquitaine
- Born: c. 937; Poitiers
- Died: 3 February 994
- Burial: Maillezais Cathedral
- Spouse: Emma of Blois
- Issue: William V, Duke of Aquitaine; Ebles
- House: Ramnulfids
- Father: William III, Duke of Aquitaine
- Mother: Gerloc of Normandy

William IV (c. 937 – 3 February 994), called Fierebras (meaning "Proud Arm", from the French Fier-à-bras (which means Proud-to-Arm), in turn from the Latin Ferox brachium) (which means A Fierce Arm), was the Duke of Aquitaine and Count of Poitou from 963 to his retirement in 990.

== Succession and conflicts with the counts of Anjou ==
William's father, William III, abdicated to the abbey of Saint-Cyprien in Poitiers and left the government to Fierebras. His mother was Gerloc, the daughter of Duke Rollo of Normandy. His sister was Adelaide, wife of Hugh Capet, the king against whom William later battled for his duchy. His early reign was characterised by many wars. He fought frequently against the counts of Anjou, the first time against Geoffrey Greymantle, who had taken Loudun.

== Conflict with Hugh Capet over the control of Aquitaine and support for a Carolingian heir ==
In 988, he went to war with the newly elected king of France, Hugh Capet, whom he refused to recognise. Capet had been granted Aquitaine by King Lothair before the latter had been reconciled to William's father. Capet renewed his claim on the great duchy and invaded it that year. A royal army was defeated on the plain of the Loire Valley. William sheltered the young Louis, the son of Charles, Duke of Lower Lorraine, the last legitimate Carolingian heir. He opened the palace of Poitiers to him and treated him as royalty, regarding him as the true heir to the French throne.

== Marital disputes with his wife Emma of Blois and abdication ==
In 968, he married Emma, daughter of Theobald I of Blois and Luitgarde of Vermandois. Their marriage was stormy, in part because of William's indulgence in the pursuit of women and, as a hunting aficionado, wild animals. She banished his paramours, they separated twice for long periods, and finally he retired to a monastery, as his father had done, leaving Emma to rule Aquitaine in the name of their son William until 1004. Their second son, Ebles, died sometime after 997.

== Sources ==
- Bachrach, Bernard S. (1993). Fulk Nerra, the Neo-Roman Consul, 987-1040. University of California Press.
- Owen, D. D. R. Eleanor of Aquitaine, Queen and Legend. 1993.
- Nouvelle Biographie Générale. Paris, 1859.

== See also ==
- Dukes of Aquitaine family tree

William IV of Aquitaine House of Poitiers Born: 937 Died: 3 February 994
| Preceded by William III | Duke of Aquitaine; 963–990 | Succeeded by William V |
| Preceded by William III | Count of Poitiers; 963–990 | Succeeded by William V |
