= Bernard II of Poitiers =

Bernard II (died February 844) was the count of Poitou from 840 until his death. His ancestry is uncertain. He was most likely the son of Bernard I, on the basis of onomastics. He was probably a member of the Guilhemid family. His brothers were Turpio (died 863) and Emenon (died 866), counts of Angoulême and Périgord, respectively.

According to Ademar of Chabannes, writing 150 years after the events, Emenon was count of Poitou in 838, when King Pippin I of Aquitaine died. He supported the succession of Pippin's son, Pippin II, but the Emperor Louis the Pious instead bestowed the kingdom of Aquitaine on his own youngest son, Charles. Bernard was resident in Poitiers in 839, when the emperor led an army against it, forcing Emenon to flee to their brother Turpio at Angoulême and Bernard to flee to Renaud, count of Herbauges. Ademar of Chabannes refers to Bernard as a "Poitevin count", comes pictavinus, but it is not clear if he means to imply that Bernard was count of Poitou at this time or just that he held the rank of count and was from the Poitou. Louis named Ranulf I as count of Poitou in Emenon's place.

Although Bernard fled to Renaud of Herbauges, this does not indicate that Bernard was in revolt, since Renaud was a loyal supporter of Emperor Louis and King Charles. In 840, Emenon submitted to the emperor and it is possible that Bernard did the same. Louis died on 20 June 840, and during the ensuing civil war between his sons, Pippin II seized control of Aquitaine. He besieged Poitiers, which resisted under its bishop, Ebroin, until he was forced to retreat by Charles's army. It is not clear if Bernard was appointed count by Pippin II in opposition to Ranulf, or if he was appointed by Charles to oppose Pippin. In any case, there is no evidence that during this time the city of Poitiers was administered by anyone other than the bishop, who was present on the scene, unlike Bernard or Ranulf.

During the civil war, Bernard joined Renaud of Herbauges in putting down the rebellion of Lambert, son of Count Lambert I of Nantes. Renaud died in 843 and his son Hervé continued the fight against Lambert. Bernard was killed in combat in February 844.

Bernard's wife was Bilichildis, known only from a bull of Pope John VIII excommunicating her son, Marquis Bernard of Gothia. The Historia inventionis et translationis reliquiarium Sancti Baudelli martyris (Note: A record of the discovery and transfer of the relics of Saint Baudilus.) records that her son had an uncle named Gauzlin who was an abbot before he was a bishop. This most likely refers to Gauzlin, abbot of Saint-Denis and then bishop of Paris. He was a son of Count Rorgon I of Maine and Bilichildis, who were thus most likely the parents of Bernard's wife as well. Besides Bernard of Gothia, Bernard and Bilichildis had another son named Emenon.

== Sources ==
- Dillange, Michel (1995). Les comtes de Poitou, ducs d'Aquitaine: 778–1204. Geste. ISBN 2-910919-09-9.
- Saint-Phalle, Édouard de (2000). "Comtes de Troyes et de Poitiers au ixe siècle: histoire d'un double échec". Onomastique et Parenté dans l'Occident médiéval. Oxford: Unit for Prosopographical Research. pp. 154–70. ISBN 1-900934-01-9.
- Settipani, Christian (2004). La Noblesse du Midi Carolingien. Oxford: Unit for Prosopographical Research. ISBN 1-900934-04-3.
