= Gerloc =

Wife of William III of Aquitaine (912–962)

Adela of Normandy
- Born: Gerloc; 912
- Died: 14 October 962
- Noble family: House of Normandy
- Spouse: William Towhead
- Issue: William IV, Duke of Aquitaine; Adelaide of Aquitaine
- Father: Rollo of Normandy
- Mother: Poppa of Bayeux

Gerloc (or Geirlaug), baptised in Rouen as Adela (or Adèle) in 912, was the daughter of Rollo, of Normandy, Count of Rouen, and his wife, Poppa of Bayeux. She was the sister of William I Longsword of Normandy.

In 935, she married William Towhead, the future Count of Poitou and Duke of Aquitaine. They had two children together before she died on 14 October 962:

- William IV of Aquitaine
- Adelaide of Aquitaine, wife of Hugh Capet.

Following the marriage, Willian Longsword requested monks from Aquitaine to help rebuild Jumièges Abbey. Twelve Monks came from the Abbey of Saint-Cyprien in Poitiers, led by their abbot Martin of Jumièges.

== Sources ==
- Commire, Anne; Klezmer, Deborah, eds. (2000). Gerloc (d. 963). Gale Group – via Encyclopedia.com. From Women in World History: A Biographical Encyclopedia volume 6, page 174
- Douglas, David C. (May 1964). William the Conqueror: The Norman Impact Upon England.
- Neveux, François (2008). A Brief History of the Normans. Constable & Robinson. ISBN 9780762433711.
