= Lupus I of Aquitaine =

Basque-Aquitanian duke active in the late 8th century

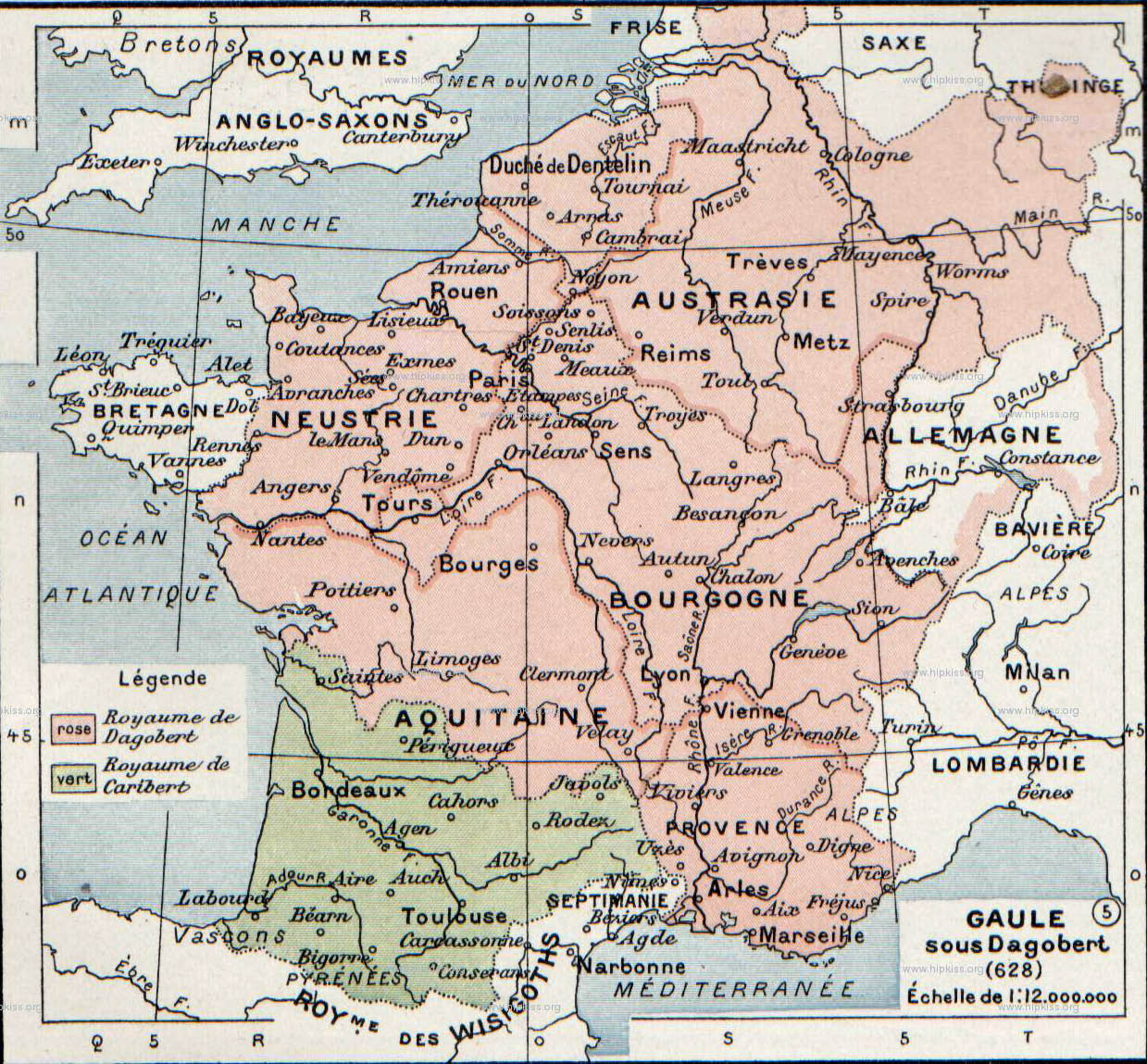
Map of Frankish Kingdoms in 628 CE

Lupus I (or Lupo I (Note: French Loup, Spanish Lobo, Basque Otsoa or Otxoa, Gascon Lop.)) was the duke of Gascony and part of Aquitaine in the Merovingian kingdom during the 670s. He may have started a dynasty, since the next-known duke of Gascony was Lupus II (fl. 769). Lupus was probably the successor of Felix, whose duchy seemed to encompass almost an identical territory to the kingdom of Charibert II. Sometime after 658, Lupus rebelled against Felix and later succeeded him. According to the Miracles of Saint Martial, the rebellion occurred during the mayorship of Ebroin.

In 673, Lupus held Toulouse and Bordeaux at which time he allied with Flavius Paulus against Wamba, the king of the Visigoths, and attacked Béziers. Julian of Toledo, in his Story of Wamba, calls Lupus a "prince" (princeps), a title suggestive of royal rank.

Sometime between 673 and 675, Lupus convoked a church synod in Bordeaux. For this he was styled vir inluster and duke, which suggests that at that time he was still a faithful subject of King Childeric II. In 675, however, he attempted to expand his Aquitanian dukedom by seizing Limoges. He was assassinated in the process. According to the Miracles of Saint Martial, he had tried to set himself up as king (in sedem regam se adstare).

== Bibliography ==
Primary

- Julian of Toledo. Historia Wambæ regis. MGH SS rer Merov V.
- Miracula Sancti Martialis Lemovicensis. MGH SS XV.

Secondary

- Estornés Lasa, Bernardo. Auñamendi Encyclopedia: Ducado de Vasconia.
- Lewis, Archibald R. "The Dukes in the Regnum Francorum, A.D. 550-751." Speculum, Vol. 51, No. 3. (July 1976), pp. 381–410.
- Higounet, Charles. Bordeaux pendant le haut moyen age. Bordeaux, 1963.
