= Palace of Poitiers =

Merogvingian palace and seat of the Duchy of Aquitaine

Coordinates: 46°34′58″N 0°20′33″E

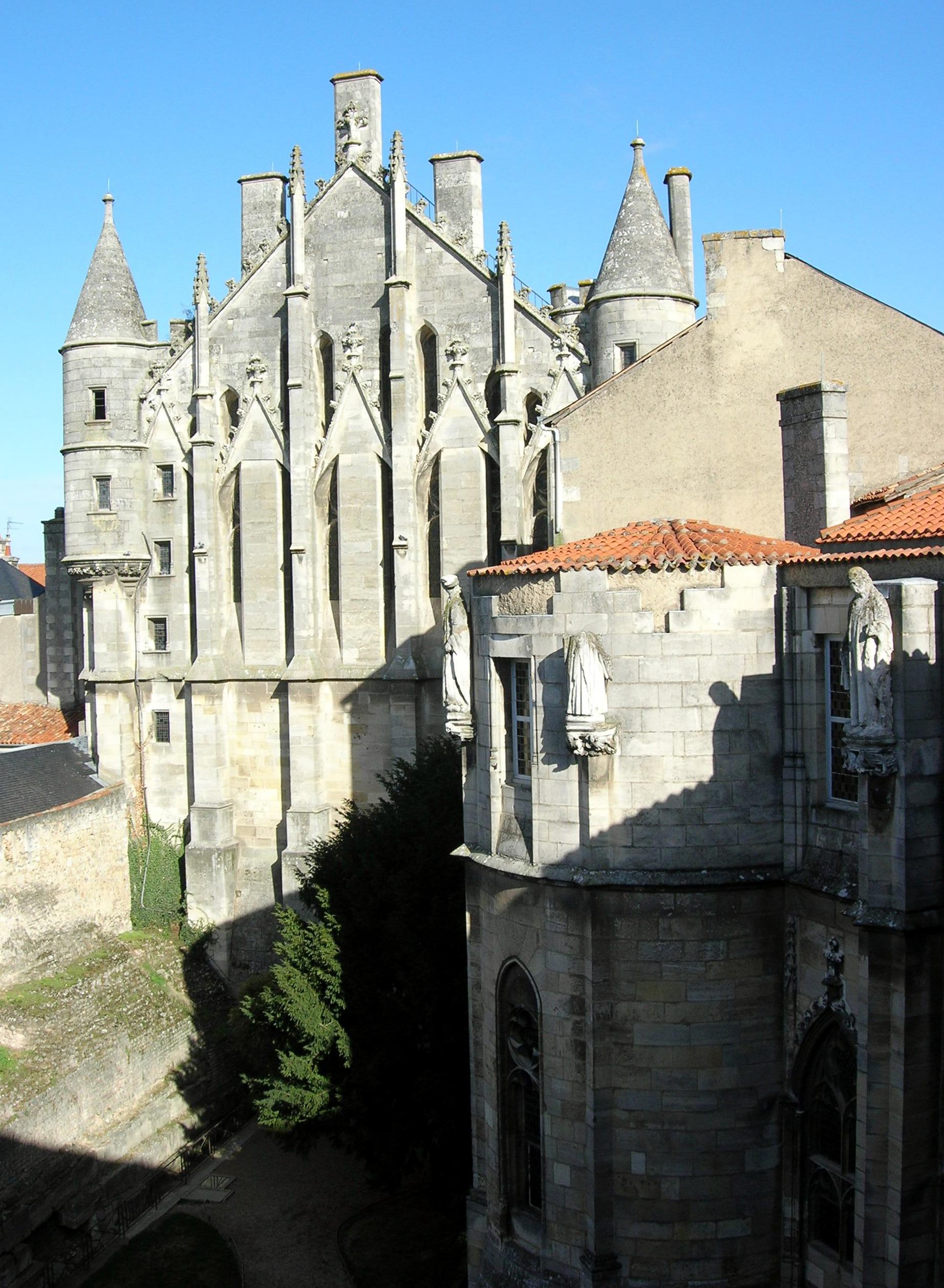
The former Palace of Justice in Poitiers, France.

The Palace of Poitiers was the palace of the Counts of Poitiers and subsequent Dukes of Aquitaine in Poitiers, in Poitou, western France. Its gothic architecture is notable as an example of the Plantagenet style.

Until 2019, this building was used as a courthouse.

== Origin ==
The former Merovingian kingdom of Aquitaine was re-established by Charlemagne for his son Louis the Pious; in the 9th century, a palace was constructed or reconstructed for him, one among many, above a Roman wall datable to the late 3rd century, at the highest spot of the town. Louis stayed there many times as a king and then returned to the palace after becoming emperor, in 839 and 840. The palatium was specifically called a palace in the reign of Charles the Bald. After the disintegration of the Carolingian realm, the palace became the seat of the Counts of Poitiers. The first palace of Poitiers was completely destroyed by a fire in 1018.

The palace was completely rebuilt, straddling the wall, by the Count-Dukes of Aquitaine, then at the pinnacle of their power. In 1104, Count William IX added a donjon on the town side. It is known as the tour Maubergeon, after his mistress Amauberge ("the Dangerous"), wife of Vicomte Aimery de Châtellerault and grandmother of Eleanor of Aquitaine. The rectangular keep is reinforced with four smaller square towers projecting from each corner; it was greatly damaged when the southern portion of the palace was set ablaze by Henry of Grosmont, Duke of Lancaster in 1346.

Between 1191 and 1204, Eleanor (locally "Alienor") fitted up a dining hall, the Salle des Pas Perdus, the "hall of lost footsteps", where a footfall was silenced by the vastness of its space— 50 metres in length, 17 metres in width, perhaps the largest in contemporary Europe. The hall has not retained its original beamed ceiling; it has been covered by chestnut woodwork, constructed in 1862 by a team of marine carpenters from La Rochelle. The walls of the hall are daubed and painted so as to imitate stone facing. Their monotony is relieved by cusped arches resting on slender columns. A stone bench rings the walls of the hall.

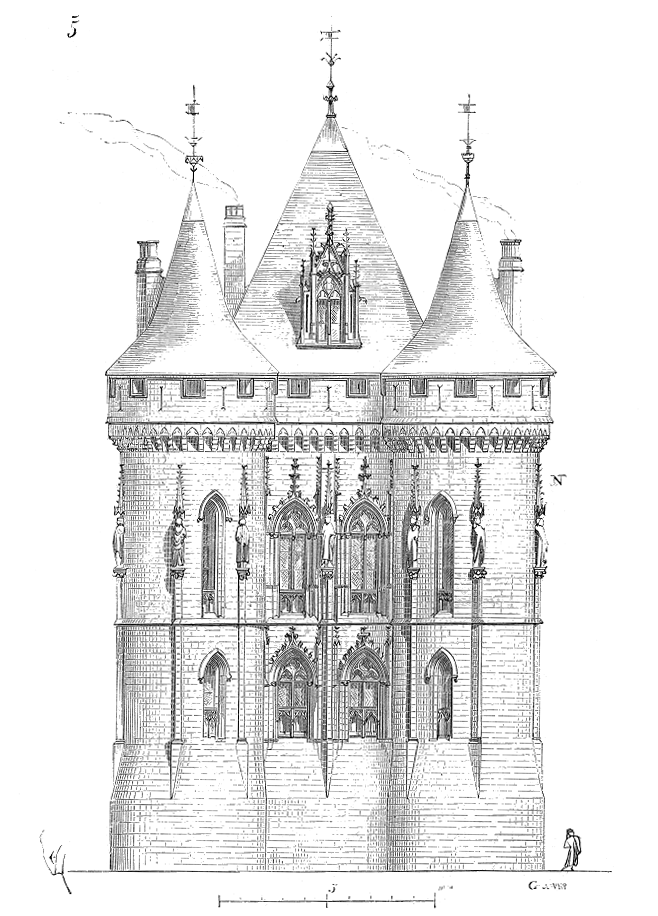
Reconstruction of the donjon as drawn by Eugène Viollet-le-Duc, 1856

== Reconstruction ==
From 1384 Jean I, duc de Berry, who was also appanage count of Poitiers, took advantage of pauses in the Hundred Years' War to rebuild the part of the palace which had been destroyed by fire. On the one hand, the donjon and the ramparts were reconstructed; on the other hand, the private apartments were restored in the Gothic Flamboyant style by Jean's court architect and sculptor Guy de Dammartin.

The tour Maubergeon was reconstructed on three floors with ogival vaulting, illuminated by glazed windows and topped by nineteen statues. Of these, only sixteen pieces survive: they represent the duke's counsellors in clerical habits, while the statues of the duke and his wife are missing. In its unfinished state, the tower has neither machicolations nor canopies above the statues.

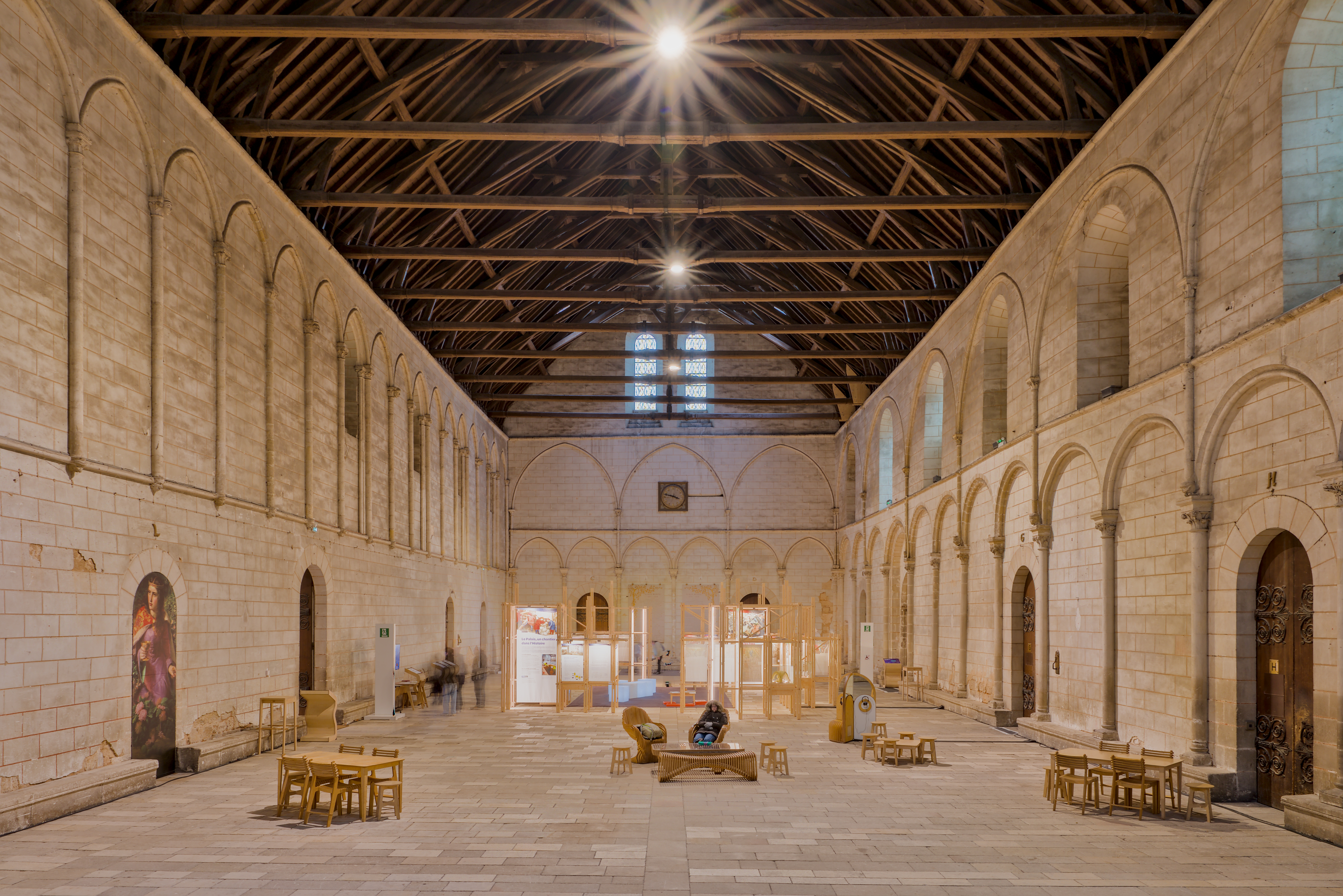
Poitiers’ former Palais de Justice: La Salle des pas perdus, ‘the hall of lost steps’

At the behest of Guy de Dammartin, three monumental stoves were installed in the grand hall; they were decorated with Gothic Flamboyant statuary and surmounted by a gallery. The southern wall of the hall was also overhauled: it was pierced by great bays which masked the pipes from outside view. The exterior of this wall was decorated with flamboyant ogives. The floor was tiled by Jehan de Valence, called "the Saracen" in the accounts, with green and gold circular lustred maiolica tiles. When the project was complete, Jehan de Valence returned home to Valencia, and no further lustred tin-glazed faience was produced in France.

== Later developments ==
The count-dukes sometimes administered justice in the great hall. It was there that Hugues de Lusignan, comte de la Marche, publicly challenged Louis IX on Christmas Day, 1241. After the province of Poitou was reattached to the royal domain, la salle des pas perdus was renamed la salle du Roi ("the royal hall"). A judicial institution, le parlement royal, sat there from 1418 to 1436.

The palace was used for administering justice: on 5 June 1453 Jacques Cœur was tried there, and justice was dispensed in the Palais de Justice through the French Revolution. In 1821, a monumental staircase with a Doric portico was attached to the medieval building. Too soon to benefit from interest generated by the Gothic Revival, the duc de Berry's private apartments were gradually demolished to make room for the appellate court and its chancery.
