= Acfred I of Carcassonne =

Acfred I (died 906) was the Count of Razès from 837 and Count of Carcassonne from 877.

Acfred was the younger son of Oliba I of Carcassonne and part of the Bellonid Dynasty. He inherited Razès on his father's death, while his elder brother Oliba II inherited Carcassonne. Acfred and Oliba probably shared authority with each other in their two counties until the elder's death in 877, when Acfred inherited both counties, probably as the regent for his nephew Bencion I, but actually as count in his own right. Bencion nevertheless succeeded him on his death.

Acfred married Adelinde of Aquitaine, daughter of Bernard Plantapilosa and sister of William I of Aquitaine. He had three sons:

- William II of Aquitaine
- Acfred of Aquitaine
- Bernard III of Auvergne

Preceded by Oliba I	Count of Razès; 837–906	Succeeded by Bencion I
Preceded by Oliba II	Count of Carcassonne; 877–906	Succeeded by Bencion I
