= Felix of Aquitaine =

7th-century Frankish patrician

Felix (floruit 660s) was a patrician in the Frankish kingdom under the Merovingians. He had his seat at Toulouse. According to the tenth-century Miracula sancti Martialis lemovicensis, Felix was "a noble and renowned patrician from the town of Toulouse, who had obtained authority over all the cities up to the Pyrenees and over the iniquitous people of the Wascones," that is, the Basques. Felix is probably the first ruler of the Duchy of Aquitaine that evolved from the old kingdom of Charibert II in the decades following his death (632) and Dagobert I's subjection of the Basques. Although he stands at the head of the list of semi-independent rulers of Aquitaine that extends through the Middle Ages, he is described as "mysterious" and "obscure".

Felix was probably a supporter of Chlothar III and his majordomo, Ebroin. His patriciate corresponds to the years when Chlothar's appointee, Erembert, was bishop of Toulouse. After Chlothar's death (673), Erembert retired and Chlothar's brother, Childeric II, took over the throne and deposed Ebroin. At this time, a certain Lupus, whom the Miracula describes as "coming to" Felix, presided over a regional synod at Bordeaux, though Felix was still in power in Aquitaine at that time. This synod was held under Childeric II, indicating continued Frankish sovereignty or suzerainty over Aquitaine and Gascony at that time, but a subsequent break with the Merovingians appears to have occurred following Childeric's death in 675. Lupus is often considered a protégé of Felix, to whom the latter delegated Gascony, and who eventually succeeded him over all Aquitaine. On the other hand, he was an opponent to Ebroin, and so may have been an enemy of Felix who usurped authority in Gascony. Later Lupus had control over southern Aquitaine and was trying to assert it in the north when he died.

== Sources ==
- Costambeys, Marios; Innes, Matthew; MacLean, Simon (2011). The Carolingian World. Cambridge Medieval Textbooks. Cambridge: Cambridge University Press.
- Higounet, Charles (1963). Bordeaux pendant le haut moyen âge. Bordeaux: Imprimeries Delmas.
- James, Edward (1977). The Merovingian Archaeology of South-West Gaul, Volume 1. BAR Supplementary Series. Vol. 25. British Archaeological Reports.
- Lewis, Archibald R. (1976). "The Dukes in the Regnum Francorum, A.D. 550–751". Speculum. 51 (3): 381–410. doi:10.2307/2851704. JSTOR 2851704. S2CID 162248053.
- Nicolle, David (2008). Poitiers AD 732: Charles Martel Turns the Islamic Tide. Campaign Series. Vol. 190. Osprey Publishing.
- Wood, Ian N. (1994). The Merovingian Kingdoms, 450–751. London: Longman.
