= County of Poitou =

Medieval county in France

County of Poitou comitatus Pictavensis (Latin)
- 778–1416
- France in 1154
- Status: Vassal state of Francia; (778-843); Vassal state of West Francia; (843-987); Vassal state of the Kingdom of France; (987-1416); In personal union with the Duchy of Aquitaine; (950s-1154); In personal union with the Kingdom of England; (1154-1205)
- Capital: Poitiers
- Government: Feudal County
- Count of Poitou
- Historical era: Middle Ages
  - Established: 778
  - Merged with the French Crown: 1416
Preceded by	Succeeded by
Francia	Kingdom of France
- Today part of: France

The County of Poitou (Latin comitatus Pictavensis) was a historical region of France, consisting of the three sub-regions of Vendée, Deux-Sèvres and Vienne. Its name is derived from the ancient Gaul tribe of Pictones. The county was bounded on the north by the Duchy of Brittany, the counties of Anjou and Touraine, on the east by the County of La Marche and on the south by the County of Angoulême. The seat of the county was at Poitiers.

Poitou was ruled by the count of Poitou, a continuous line of which can be traced back to an appointment of Charlemagne in 778. From the 950s on, the counts were also dukes of Aquitaine. After the marriage of Eleanor of Aquitaine with Louis VII of France in 1138, the Seneschal of Poitou was responsible for the day-to-day affairs of the county. From 1154, through Eleanor's second marriage, Poitou passed to the kings of England.

Poitou was conquered by King Philip II of France in 1205 after he declared it a confiscated fief of the crown. Henry III of England failed to retake it in the Saintonge War. One of the main battlegrounds of Hundred Years' War between the French and English in the 14th and 15th centuries, Poitou was finally merged with the French crown in 1416.
