= Ranulf II of Aquitaine =

Frankish noble (850–890)

King of Aquitaine (self proclaimed)
- Reign: 888 – 889/890
- Predecessor: Charles the Fat
- Successor: Office abolished

Count of Poitiers
- Reign: 866 – 890
- Predecessor: Ranulf I of Aquitaine
- Successor: William I of Aquitaine

Duke of Aquitaine
- Reign: 887 – 890
- Predecessor: Ranulf I of Aquitaine
- Successor: William I of Aquitaine
- Born: c. 850
- Died: 5 August 890
- Issue: Ranulf III; Ebles Manzer (illeg)
- House: Ramnulfids
- Father: Ranulf I of Aquitaine

Ranulf II (also spelled Rannoux, Rannulf, Ramnulf, and Ranulph) (850 – 5 August 890) was Count of Poitou from 866 and Duke of Aquitaine from 887. On the death of Charles the Fat in 888, he styled himself King of Aquitaine and did so until 889 or his death, after which the title fell into abeyance.

== Family and sons ==
Ranulf was a son of Ranulf I and Adeltrude of Maine. He married an Ermengard (died 935) and by her had a son, Ranulf III of Poitiers, who succeeded him in Poitiers. His illegitimate son Ebalus succeeded him in Aquitaine and upon the death of Ranulf III, in Poitiers too.

== King of Aquitaine ==
Ranulf may have been selected as a king by the Aquitanian nobles, for they accepted King Odo of France in 892 only after Ranulf's death. Only the Annales Fuldenses definitively give him this title, saying "Ranulf then set himself up as king" (Deinceps Rannolfus se regem haberi statuit). He is recorded to have taken custody of Charles, the young son of Louis the Stammerer and he certainly did not recognise Odo as king. The Annales Vedastes record that in 889

Post nativitatem vero Domini cum paucis Francis Aquitaniam perrexit, ut eos sibi sociaret. Quo audito, Ramnulfus, dux maximae partis Aquitaniae, cum sibi faventibus venit ad eum, adducens secum Karolum puerum, filium Hludowici regis; et iuravit illi quae digna fuerunt, simul et de ipso puerulo... Aquitanos itaque rex ex parte receptos, festinavit propter Nortmannos redire in Franciam.
After Christmas [888], [Odo] went to Aquitaine with a few Franks, in order to be accepted [as king]. Upon hearing this, Ranulf, duke of the greater part of Aquitaine, with his supporters came to him, bringing with him the child, Charles, the son of King Louis; and he swore to him who was worthy of it [i.e., Odo], as did the boy... So the king returned from Aquitaine to France [in June] because of the Norsemen.

== Founder of the viscountcy of Thouars ==
Ranulf founded the viscountcy of Thouars at about this time, as part of a larger movement to create viscounts with powers over regional fortresses to man them against the Vikings.

== See also ==
- Ramnulfids
- Dukes of Aquitaine family tree

== Sources ==
- Le Jan, Régine (2003). "Anatomie de la famille". Famille et pouvoir dans le monde franc (VIIe-Xe siècle). Éditions de la Sorbonne. pp. 157–158. doi:10.4000/books.psorbonne.24603. ISBN 9782859442682.
- Lewis, Archibald Ross. The Development of Southern French and Catalan Society, 718–1050. University of Texas Press: Austin, 1965.
- MacLean, Simon. Kingship and Politics in the Late Ninth Century: Charles the Fat and the end of the Carolingian Empire. Cambridge University Press: 2003.
- McKitterick, Rosamond (1999). The Frankish Kingdoms under the Carolingians, 751-987. Longman.

Ranulf II of Aquitaine Ramnulfid dynasty Born: 850 Died: 5 August 890
Regnal titles
Vacant Title last held by Louis the Stammerer	King of Aquitaine; 888–890	Vacant Title next held by Louis the Sluggard
Vacant Title last held by Ranulf I	Duke of Aquitaine; 887–888	Succeeded by Ebalus
Preceded by Ranulf I	Count of Poitou; 886–890	Succeeded by Ebalus
