= Ranulf I of Aquitaine =

Frankish noble (820–866)

Ranulf I (also Ramnulf, Rannulf, and Ranulph) (820–866) was a Count of Poitiers (from 835) and Duke of Aquitaine (from 852). He is the son of Gerard, Count of Auvergne. Few details are known about Ranulf I, except that he died in 866 in Aquitaine from wounds received in the Battle of Brissarthe against the Vikings (in which Robert the Strong also died).

== Marriage and issue ==
Ranulf married Adaltrude of Maine, a daughter of Rorgon I, (Note: Rosamond McKitterick states that Ranulf married a daughter of Rorgo, though she does not give a name.) and they had the following children:

- Ranulf II, who inherited Poitou and later acquired Aquitaine. He was also abbot of Saint-Hilary (888).
- Gauzbert (d. 893)
- Ebalus (857–2 October 892). During the Norman siege of Paris, Ebles of Saint-Germain-des-Prés governed the city in Odo’s absence while the latter sought aid from Charles the Fat. While defending the city, he demonstrated notable skill with the bow, but was also struck by a lance. He was abbot of Saint-Germain-des-Prés (881), Saint-Denis (886), Saint-Wandrille (886–892), and Saint-Hilary of Poitiers (889). He died while besieging Loudun Castle during the war in which Aymar I of Angoulême conquered Poitou.

== See also ==
- Ramnulfids
- Dukes of Aquitaine family tree

== Sources ==
- Le Jan, Régine (2003). Anatomie de la famille: Famille et pouvoir dans le monde franc (VIIe-Xe siècle). Éditions de la Sorbonne. doi:10.4000/books.psorbonne.24603.
- McKitterick, Rosamond (1999). The Frankish Kingdoms under the Carolingians, 751-987. Longman.
- Nelson, Janet L., ed. (1991). The Annals of St-Bertin: Ninth-century Histories. Vol. I. Manchester University Press.

Preceded by Hunald II	Duke of Aquitaine; 852–866	Succeeded by Louis the Stammerer (as King)
Preceded by Bernard I	Count of Poitiers; 835–866	Succeeded by Ranulf II
