= Duke of Aquitaine =

Ruler of the ancient region of Aquitaine

Map of France in 1154

The duke of Aquitaine (Occitan: Duc d'Aquitània, French: Duc d'Aquitaine, IPA: [dyk dakitɛn]) was the ruler of the medieval region of Aquitaine (not to be confused with modern-day Aquitaine) under the supremacy of Frankish, English, and later French kings.

As successor states of the Visigothic Kingdom (418–721), Aquitania (Aquitaine) and Languedoc (Toulouse) inherited both Visigothic law and Roman Law, which together allowed women more rights than their contemporaries would enjoy until the 20th century. Particularly under the Liber Judiciorum as codified in 642/643 and expanded by the Code of Recceswinth in 653, women could inherit land and titles and manage their holdings independently from their husbands or male relations, dispose of their property in legal wills if they had no heirs, represent themselves and bear witness in court from the age of 14, and arrange for their own marriages after the age of 20. As a consequence, male-preference primogeniture was the practiced succession law for the nobility.

== Coronation ==
The Merovingian kings and dukes of Aquitaine used Toulouse as their capital. The Carolingian kings used different capitals situated farther north. In 765, Pepin the Short bestowed the captured golden banner of the Aquitainian duke, Waiffre, on the Abbey of Saint Martial in Limoges. Pepin I of Aquitaine was buried in Poitiers. Charles the Child was crowned at Limoges and buried at Bourges. When Aquitaine briefly asserted its independence after the death of Charles the Fat, it was Ranulf II of Poitou who took the royal title. In the late tenth century, Louis the Indolent was crowned at Brioude.

The Aquitainian ducal coronation procedure is preserved in a late twelfth-century ordo (formula) from Saint-Étienne in Limoges, based on an earlier Romano-German ordo. In the early thirteenth century a commentary was added to this ordo, which emphasised Limoges as the capital of Aquitaine. The ordo indicated that the duke received a silk mantle, coronet, banner, sword, spurs, and the ring of Saint Valerie.

== Visigothic dukes ==
- Suatrius (flor. 493), captured by Clovis I during the First Franco-Visigothic War.

== Dukes of Aquitaine under Frankish kings ==
Merovingian kings are in boldface.

- **Chram** (555–560)
- Desiderius (583–587, jointly with Bladast)
- Bladast (583–587, jointly with Desiderius)
- **Gundoald** (584/585)
- Austrovald (587–589)
- Sereus (589–592)
- **Chlothar II** (592–629)
- **Charibert II** (629–632)
- **Chilperic** (632)
- Boggis (632–660)
- Felix (660–670)
- Lupus I (670–676)
- Odo the Great (688–735), his reign commenced perhaps as late as 692, 700, or 715, unclear parentage
- Hunald I (735–745), son of Odo the Great, abdicated to a monastery
- Waifer (745–768), son of Hunald I
- Hunald II (768–769), probably son of Waifer
- Lupo II (768–781), Duke of Gascony, opposed Charlemagne's rule and Hunald's relatives.

== Restored dukes of Aquitaine under Frankish kings ==
The Carolingian kings again appointed Dukes of Aquitaine, first in 852, and again since 866. Later, this duchy was also called Guyenne.

=== House of Poitiers (Ramnulfids) ===
Name	Birth	Marriage(s)	Death	King of the Franks (reign)
Ranulph I 852 (Note: Count of Poitiers from 835, Duke of Aquitaine from 852) – 866	820	Adeltrude of Maine; 3 children	866	Charles the Bald; 843–877)
Ranulph II (Note: Son of Ranulf I, also Count of Poitiers, called himself King of Aquitaine from 888 until his death.); 887 – 890	850	N/A	5 August 890	Charles the Fat (881–888) Odo (888–898)

=== House of Auvergne ===
The following were also Count of Auvergne.

Name	Portrait	Birth	Death	King of the Franks
William I the Pious (893–918)		22 March 875	6 July 918 (aged 43)	Odo (888–898) Charles the Simple (898–922) Charles the Simple (898–922) Robert I (922–923) Rudolph (923–936)
William II the Younger (Note: nephew of William I) (918–926)			12 December 926	Odo (888–898) Charles the Simple (898–922) Charles the Simple (898–922) Robert I (922–923) Rudolph (923–936)
Acfred (Note: brother of William II) (926–927)			927	Odo (888–898) Charles the Simple (898–922) Charles the Simple (898–922) Robert I (922–923) Rudolph (923–936)

=== House of Poitiers (Ramnulfids) restored (927–932) ===
- Ebalus the Bastard (also called Manzer) (927–932)), illegitimate son of Ranulph II and distant cousin of Acfred, also Count of Poitiers and Auvergne.

=== House of Rouergue ===
- Raymond I Pons (932–936)
- Raymond II (936–955)

=== House of Capet ===
- Hugh the Great (955–962)

=== House of Poitiers (Ramnulfids) restored (962–1152) ===
- William III Towhead (962–963), son of Ebalus, also Count of Poitiers and Auvergne.
- William IV Iron Arm (963–995), son of William III, also Count of Poitiers.
- William V the Great (995–1030), son of William IV, also Count of Poitiers.
- William VI the Fat (1030–1038), first son of William V, also Count of Poitiers.
- Odo (1038–1039), second son of William V, also Count of Poitiers and Duke of Gascony.
- William VII the Eagle (1039–1058), third son of William V, also Count of Poitiers.
- William VIII (1058–1086), fourth son of William V, also Count of Poitiers and Duke of Gascony.
- William IX the Troubadour (or the Younger) (1086–1127), son of William VIII, also Count of Poitiers and Duke of Gascony.
- William X the Saint (1127–1137), son of William IX, also Count of Poitiers and Duke of Gascony.
- Eleanor of Aquitaine (1137–1204), daughter of William X, also Countess of Poitiers and Duchess of Gascony, married the kings of France and England in succession.
  - Louis the Younger (1137–1152), also King of France, duke in right of his wife.

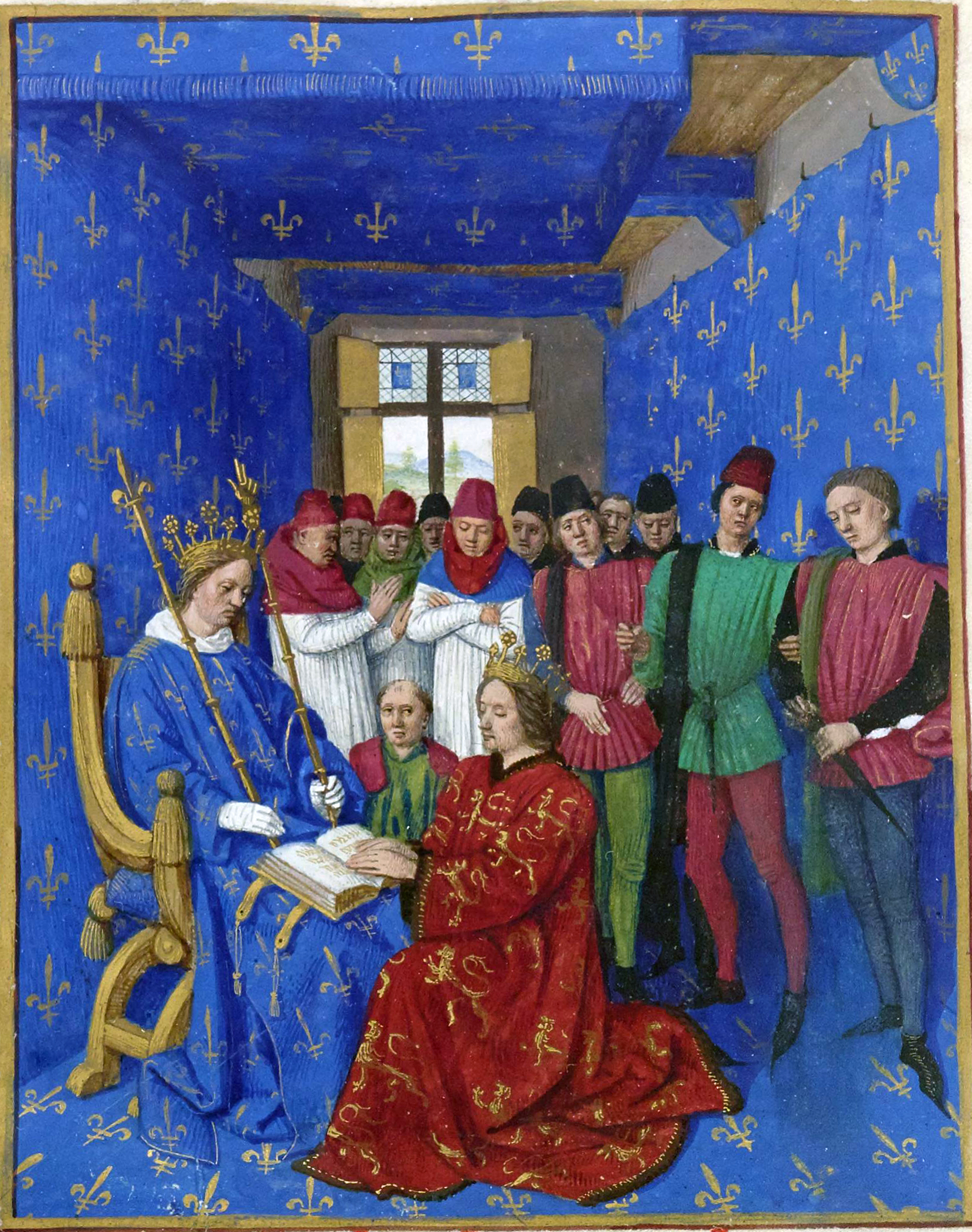
Homage of Edward I of England (kneeling) to Philip IV of France (seated), by Jean Fouquet. As Duke of Aquitaine, Edward was a vassal to the French king

From 1152, the Duchy of Aquitaine was held by the Plantagenets, who also ruled England as independent monarchs and held other territories in France by separate inheritance (see Plantagenet Empire). The Plantagenets were often more powerful than the kings of France, and their reluctance to do homage to the kings of France for their lands in France was one of the major sources of conflict in medieval Western Europe.

=== House of Plantagenet ===
Name	Portrait	Arms	Birth	Marriage(s)	Death	King of France
Henry I (Note: Duke of Aquitaine by right of his wife, Eleanor of Aquitaine.); Henry Curtmantle; 18 May 1152 (Note: Henry Curmantle was crowned as King Henry II of England on 19 December 1154 with his queen, Eleanor of Aquitaine.) – June 1172 (20 years)	Henry II	Royal Arms of England (1154–1189)	5 March 1133; Le Mans Son of Geoffrey Plantagenet of Anjou and Matilda	Eleanor of Aquitaine; Bordeaux Cathedral; 18 May 1152; 8 children	6 July 1189; Chinon; Aged 56 (Note: Henry II was buried at Fontevraud Abbey.)	Louis VII (1137–1180)
Henry I Henry Curtmantle; 18 May 1152 – June 1172 (20 years)	Henry II	Royal Arms of England (1154–1189)	5 March 1133; Le Mans Son of Geoffrey Plantagenet of Anjou and Matilda	Eleanor of Aquitaine; Bordeaux Cathedral; 18 May 1152; 8 children	6 July 1189; Chinon; Aged 56	Philip II (1180–1223)
Richard I (Note: Ruled alongside his mother, Eleanor of Aquitaine, who acted as regent for the Duchy while he was on crusade – a position he resumed on his return to Europe.); Richard the Lionheart; June 1172 (Note: Richard was first appointed Duke of Aquitaine in 1172 by his father, Henry II of England, the previous Duke. Richard would later be crowned King of England on 3 September 1189, several months after his father's death on 6 July.) – 6 April 1199 (26 years, 10 months)	Richard the Lionheart, an illustration from a 12th-century codex	1198–1340	8 September 1157; Beaumont Palace Son of Henry II and Eleanor of Aquitaine	Berengaria of Navarre; Limassol; 12 May 1191; No children	6 April 1199; Châlus; Shot by a quarrel aged 41 (Note: Richard I was buried at Rouen Cathedral. His body currently lies at Fontevraud Abbey.)	Philip II (1180–1223)
John (Note: Ruled alongside his mother, Eleanor of Aquitaine, until her death in 1204; afterwards, sole duke of Aquitaine.); John Lackland; 27 May 1199 (Note: John was crowned on 27 May 1199.) – 19 October 1216 (17 years, 146 days)	King John	1198–1340	24 December 1166; Beaumont Palace Son of Henry II and Eleanor of Aquitaine	(1) Isabel of Gloucester; Marlborough Castle; 29 August 1189; No children (2) Isabella of Angoulême; Bordeaux Cathedral; 24 August 1200; 5 children	19 October 1216; Newark-on-Trent; Aged 49 (Note: John was buried at Worcester Cathedral.)	Philip II (1180–1223)
Henry II; Henry III of England; 28 October 1216 (Note: Henry III was crowned on 28 October 1216.) – 16 November 1272 (56 years, 20 days)	Henry III	1198–1340	1 October 1207; Winchester Castle Son of John and Isabella of Angoulême	Eleanor of Provence; Canterbury Cathedral; 14 January 1236; 5 children	16 November 1272; Westminster Palace; Aged 65	Philip II (1180–1223)
Henry II; Henry III of England; 28 October 1216 – 16 November 1272 (56 years, 20 days)	Henry III	1198–1340	1 October 1207; Winchester Castle Son of John and Isabella of Angoulême	Eleanor of Provence; Canterbury Cathedral; 14 January 1236; 5 children	16 November 1272; Westminster Palace; Aged 65	Louis VIII (1223–1226)
Henry II; Henry III of England; 28 October 1216 – 16 November 1272 (56 years, 20 days)	Henry III	1198–1340	1 October 1207; Winchester Castle Son of John and Isabella of Angoulême	Eleanor of Provence; Canterbury Cathedral; 14 January 1236; 5 children	16 November 1272; Westminster Palace; Aged 65	Louis IX (1226–1270)
Henry II; Henry III of England; 28 October 1216 – 16 November 1272 (56 years, 20 days)	Henry III	1198–1340	1 October 1207; Winchester Castle Son of John and Isabella of Angoulême	Eleanor of Provence; Canterbury Cathedral; 14 January 1236; 5 children	16 November 1272; Westminster Palace; Aged 65	Philip III "the Bold" (1270–1285)
Edward I Edward Longshanks; 20 November 1272 (Note: Edward I was crowned on 19 August 1274 with Queen Eleanor.) – 7 July 1307 (34 years, 230 days)	Edward I of England	1198–1340	17 June 1239; Palace of Westminster Son of Henry III and Eleanor of Provence	(1) Eleanor of Castile; Abbey of Santa María la Real de Las Huelgas; 18 October 1254; 16 children (2) Margaret of France; Canterbury Cathedral; 10 September 1299; 3 children	7 July 1307; Burgh by Sands; Aged 68	Philip III "the Bold" (1270–1285)
Edward I Edward Longshanks; 20 November 1272 – 7 July 1307 (34 years, 230 days)	Edward I of England	1198–1340	17 June 1239; Palace of Westminster Son of Henry III and Eleanor of Provence	(1) Eleanor of Castile; Abbey of Santa María la Real de Las Huelgas; 18 October 1254; 16 children (2) Margaret of France; Canterbury Cathedral; 10 September 1299; 3 children	7 July 1307; Burgh by Sands; Aged 68	Philip IV the Fair (1285–1314)
Edward II; Edward of Caernarfon; 8 July 1307 (Note: Edward II was crowned on 25 February 1308 with Queen Isabella.) – 1325 (Note: Edward II continued as King of England until 20 January 1325) (18 years, 1 day)		1198–1340	25 April 1284; Caernarfon Castle Son of Edward I and Eleanor of Castile	Isabella of France; Boulogne Cathedral; 24 January 1308; 4 children	21 September 1327; Berkeley Castle; Murdered aged 43 (Note: The date of Edward II's death is disputed by historian Ian Mortimer, who argues that he may not have been murdered, but held imprisoned in Europe for several more years.)	Philip IV the Fair (1285–1314)
Edward II; Edward of Caernarfon; 8 July 1307 – 1325 (18 years, 1 day)		1198–1340	25 April 1284; Caernarfon Castle Son of Edward I and Eleanor of Castile	Isabella of France; Boulogne Cathedral; 24 January 1308; 4 children	21 September 1327; Berkeley Castle; Murdered aged 43	Louis X "the Quarreller" (1314–1316)
Edward II; Edward of Caernarfon; 8 July 1307 – 1325 (18 years, 1 day)		1198–1340	25 April 1284; Caernarfon Castle Son of Edward I and Eleanor of Castile	Isabella of France; Boulogne Cathedral; 24 January 1308; 4 children	21 September 1327; Berkeley Castle; Murdered aged 43	John I "the Posthumous" (4 days in 1316)
Edward II; Edward of Caernarfon; 8 July 1307 – 1325 (18 years, 1 day)		1198–1340	25 April 1284; Caernarfon Castle Son of Edward I and Eleanor of Castile	Isabella of France; Boulogne Cathedral; 24 January 1308; 4 children	21 September 1327; Berkeley Castle; Murdered aged 43	Philip V "the Tall" (1316–1322)
Edward II; Edward of Caernarfon; 8 July 1307 – 1325 (18 years, 1 day)		1198–1340	25 April 1284; Caernarfon Castle Son of Edward I and Eleanor of Castile	Isabella of France; Boulogne Cathedral; 24 January 1308; 4 children	21 September 1327; Berkeley Castle; Murdered aged 43	Charles IV "the Fair" (1322–1328)
Edward III; Edward of Windsor; 1325 (Note: Edward of Windsor, while still heir to the throne, was appointed Duke of Aquitaine by his father, King Edward II of England. After the king was overthrown by the Parliament of 1327, Edward III was proclaimed the new King of England on 25 January 1327, and crowned on 1 February 1327.) – 24 October 1360 (Note: On 24 May 1337, Philip VI of France confiscated the Duchy of Aquitaine from Edward III, beginning the Hundred Years' War. Regardless, Edward III continued to title himself Duke of Aquitaine, and responded by claiming the throne of France for himself. Edward continued to use the titles of King of England and France and Duke of Aquitaine until the Treaty of Brétigny in 1360, when Edward renounced these titles in exchange for recognition as sovereign Lord of Aquitaine.) (35 years, 274 days)		1198–1340	13 November 1312; Windsor Castle Son of Edward II and Isabella of France	Philippa of Hainault; York Minster; 25 January 1328; 14 children	21 June 1377; Sheen Palace; Aged 64	Charles IV "the Fair" (1322–1328)
Edward III; Edward of Windsor; 1325 – 24 October 1360 (35 years, 274 days)		1340–1360, from 1369	13 November 1312; Windsor Castle Son of Edward II and Isabella of France	Philippa of Hainault; York Minster; 25 January 1328; 14 children	21 June 1377; Sheen Palace; Aged 64	Philip VI "the Fortunate" (1328–1350) (Note: Philip VI and John II's position as King of France was disputed by King Edward III of England from 1340 until 1360.)
Edward III; Edward of Windsor; 1325 – 24 October 1360 (35 years, 274 days)		1360–1369	13 November 1312; Windsor Castle Son of Edward II and Isabella of France	Philippa of Hainault; York Minster; 25 January 1328; 14 children	21 June 1377; Sheen Palace; Aged 64	John II "the Good" (1350–1364)

== Plantagenet rulers of Aquitaine ==
In 1337, King Philip VI of France reclaimed the fief of Aquitaine from Edward III, King of England. Edward in turn claimed the title of King of France, by right of his descent from his maternal grandfather King Philip IV of France. This triggered the Hundred Years' War, in which both the Plantagenets and the House of Valois claimed supremacy over Aquitaine.

Name	Portrait	Arms	Birth	Marriage(s)	Death
Edward III; Edward of Windsor; 1337–1360		Until 1340, 1360–1369 1340–1360, from 1369	13 November 1312; Windsor Castle Son of Edward II and Isabella of France	Philippa of Hainault; York Minster; 25 January 1328; 14 children	21 June 1377; Sheen Palace; Aged 64

=== Lord of Aquitaine (1360–1369) ===
In 1360, both sides signed the Treaty of Brétigny, in which Edward renounced the French crown but remained sovereign Lord of Aquitaine (rather than merely duke). However, when the treaty was broken in 1369, both these English claims and the war resumed.

Name	Portrait	Arms	Birth	Marriage(s)	Death
Edward III; Edward of Windsor; 1337–1360		1360–1369	13 November 1312; Windsor Castle Son of Edward II and Isabella of France	Philippa of Hainault; York Minster; 25 January 1328; 14 children	21 June 1377; Sheen Palace; Aged 64

=== Prince of Aquitaine and Gascony (1362–1372) ===
In 1362, King Edward III, as Lord of Aquitaine, made his eldest son Edward, Prince of Wales, Prince of Aquitaine and Gascony.

Name	Portrait	Arms	Birth	Marriage(s)	Death
Edward, Prince of Wales; 19 July 1362 – 6 October 1372; 10 years, 79 days			15 June 1330; Woodstock Palace Son of Edward III and Philippa of Hainault; 2 children	Joan of Kent; 1361	8 June 1376; Westminster Palace; Aged 45

On 6 October 1372, Prince Edward (who had returned to England the previous year) resigned the Principality of Aquitaine and Gascony, stating that the revenues he earned from Aquitaine were no longer sufficient to cover his expenses. Thus, King Edward III, his father, resumed his title as Duke of Aquitaine.

=== Duke of Aquitaine (1372–1453) ===
Name	Portrait	Arms	Birth	Marriage(s)	Death
Edward III; Edward of Windsor; 1372 – 21 June 1377 (5 years)		From 1369	13 November 1312; Windsor Castle Son of Edward II and Isabella of France	Philippa of Hainault; York Minster; 25 January 1328; 14 children	21 June 1377; Sheen Palace; Aged 64
Richard II; Richard of Bordeaux; 22 June 1377 (Note: Richard II was crowned on 16 July 1377.) – 1390 (13 years)		From 1369	6 January 1367; Archbishop's Palace of Bordeaux Son of Edward the Black Prince and Joan of Kent	(1) Anne of Bohemia; 14 January 1382; Westminster Abbey; No children (2) Isabella of Valois; Church of St. Nicholas, Calais; 4 November 1396; No children	14 February 1400; Pontefract Castle; Aged 33
John II; John of Gaunt (Note: In 1390, King Richard II, son of Edward the Black Prince, appointed his uncle John of Gaunt Duke of Aquitaine. This grant expired upon the Duke's death, and the dukedom reverted to the Crown. Regardless, due to Henry IV's seizure of the crown, he still came into possession of the dukedom.) (Note: Also Duke of Lancaster (1362), Earl of Leicester, Earl of Lancaster, Earl of Derby, Baron of Halton (1361). Formerly Earl of Richmond from 1342 until 1372.); 1390 – 1399; 9 years	John of Gaunt		6 March 1340; Ghent son of Edward III and Philippa of Hainault	Blanche of Lancaster; 19 May 1359 – 12 September 1368; 8 children Constance of Castile; 21 September 1371 – 24 March 1394; 2 children Katherine Swynford; 13 January 1396; 4 children	3 February 1399; Leicester Castle aged 58
Richard II (Note: Second tenure); Richard of Bordeaux; 3 February – 30 September 1399 (239 days)		1395–1399	6 January 1367; Archbishop's Palace of Bordeaux Son of Edward the Black Prince and Joan of Kent	(1) Anne of Bohemia; 14 January 1382; Westminster Abbey; No children (2) Isabella of Valois; Church of St. Nicholas, Calais; 4 November 1396; No children	14 February 1400; Pontefract Castle; Aged 33
Henry III of Aquitaine; Henry IV of England; 30 September 1399 (Note: Henry IV was crowned on 13 October 1399.) – c. 1400	Henry IV	until 1406	c. April 1367; Bolingbroke Castle Son of John of Gaunt and Blanche of Lancaster	(1) Mary de Bohun; Arundel Castle; 27 July 1380; 6 children (2) Joanna of Navarre; Winchester Cathedral; 7 February 1403; No children	20 March 1413; Westminster Abbey; Aged 45
Henry IV of Aquitaine; Henry of Monmouth (Note: Henry, Prince of Wales to 1413, Henry V of England afterwards) c. 1400 – 31 August 1422 (22 years)	Henry V	until 1406 1406–1413 from 1413	16 September 1386; Monmouth Castle Son of Henry IV and Mary de Bohun	Catherine of Valois; Troyes Cathedral; 2 June 1420; 1 son	31 August 1422; Château de Vincennes; Aged 35
Henry VI; 1 September 1422 (Note: Henry VI was crowned on 6 November 1429.) – 1453 (Note: Effectively lost control of Aquitaine after the end of the Hundred Year's War) (31 years)	Henry VI		6 December 1421; Windsor Castle Son of Henry V and Catherine of Valois	Margaret of Anjou; Titchfield Abbey; 22 April 1445; 1 son	21 May 1471; Tower of London; Allegedly murdered aged 49
Duchy of Aquitaine annexed into the Kingdom of France, title abolished

== Valois and Bourbon dukes of Aquitaine ==
The Valois kings of France, claiming supremacy over Aquitaine, granted the title of duke to their heirs, the Dauphins.

- John II (1345–1350), son of Philip VI of France, acceded in 1350 as King of France.
- Charles, Dauphin of France, Duke of Guyenne (1392?–1401), son of Charles VI of France, Dauphin.
- Louis (1401–1415), son of Charles VI of France, Dauphin.

With the end of the Hundred Years' War, Aquitaine returned under direct rule of the king of France and remained in the possession of the king. Only occasionally was the duchy or the title of duke granted to another member of the dynasty.

- Charles, Duc de Berry (1469–1472), son of Charles VII of France.
- Xavier (1753–1754), second son of Louis, Dauphin of France.

The Infante Jaime, Duke of Segovia, son of Alfonso XIII of Spain, was one of the Legitimist pretenders to the French throne. In 1972, he conferred the hereditary title of Duke of Aquitaine on his son, Gonzalo, who died in 2000 without legitimate progeny.

== Family tree ==
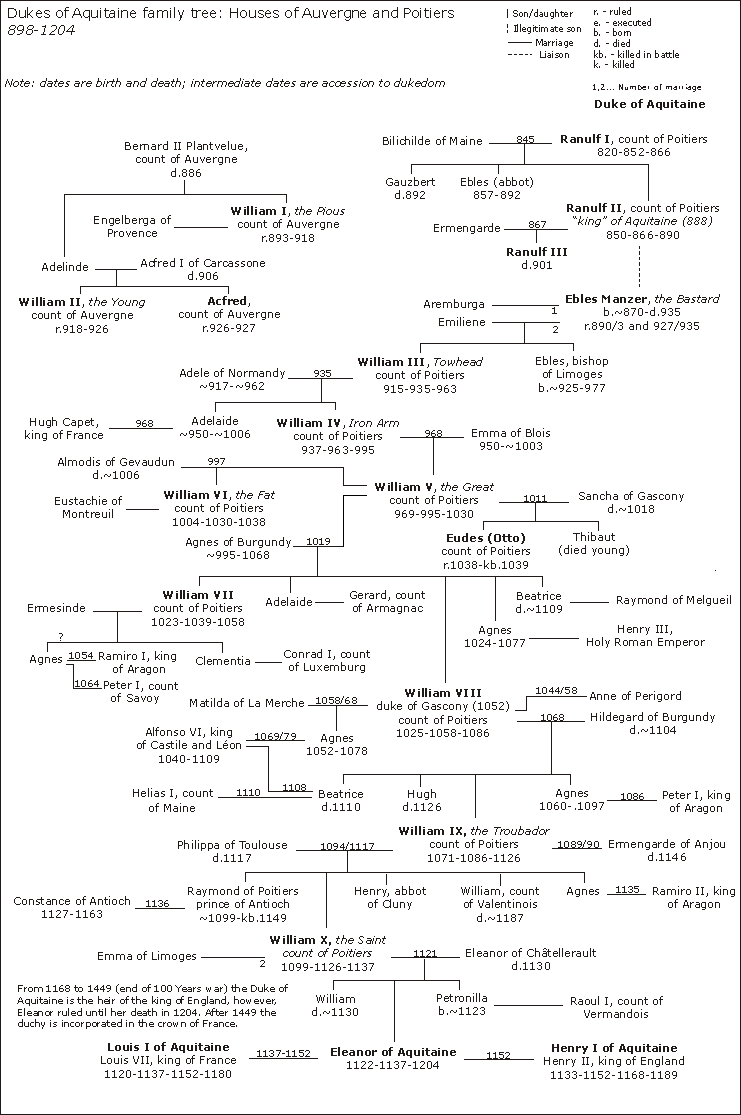

== See also ==
- List of Aquitainian consorts
