= William III of Aquitaine =

Duke of Aquitaine from 959 to 963

William III

Duke of Aquitaine
- Reign: 959 – 3 April 963
- Predecessor: Ebalus, Duke of Aquitaine
- Successor: William IV, Duke of Aquitaine
- Born: 913; Poitiers, France
- Died: 3 April 963; Saint-Maixent-l'École, France
- Burial: Abbaye Saint-Cyprien de Poitiers
- Spouse: Gerloc
- Issue: William IV, Duke of Aquitaine; Adelaide of Aquitaine
- House: Ramnulfids
- Father: Ebalus, Duke of Aquitaine
- Mother: Emilienne

William III (913 – 3 April 963), called Towhead (French: Tête d'étoupe, Latin: Caput Stupe) from the colour of his hair, was the "Count of the Duchy of Aquitaine" from 959 and Duke of Aquitaine from 962 to his death. He was also the Count of Poitiers from 935 and Count of Auvergne from 950. The primary sources for his reign are Ademar of Chabannes, Dudo of Saint-Quentin, and William of Jumièges.

== Hereditary claim to the Duchy of Aquitaine ==
William was son of Ebalus Manzer and Emilienne. He was born in Poitiers. He claimed the Duchy of Aquitaine from his father's death, but the royal chancery did not recognise his ducal title until the year before his own death.

== Conflicts with Louis IV and Lothair of France ==
Shortly after the death of King Rudolph in 936, he was constrained to cede some land to Hugh the Great by Louis IV. He did it with grace, but his relationship with Hugh thenceforward deteriorated. In 950, Hugh was reconciled with Louis and granted the duchies of Burgundy and Aquitaine. He tried to conquer Aquitaine with Louis's assistance, but William defeated them. Lothair, Louis's successor, feared the power of William. In August 955 he joined Hugh to besiege Poitiers, which resisted successfully. William, however, gave battle and was routed.

== Hugh Capet as a rival claimant to Aquitaine ==
After the death of Hugh, his son Hugh Capet was named Duke of Aquitaine, but he never tried to take up his fief, as William reconciled with Lothair.

== Control over Saint-Hilaire-le-Grand and construction of a new library in Poitiers ==
William was given the abbey of Saint-Hilaire-le-Grand, which remained in his house after his death. He also built a library in the palace of Poitiers.

== Family background, marriage and issue ==
His father was duke Ebles Manzer, who already was a man in his middle years when William was born in about 913. According to the chronicle of Ademar de Chabannes, William's wife was Geirlaug (French: Gerloc, also known as Adèle), a daughter of Rollo of Normandy. The less reliable Dudo of Saint-Quentin has William rather than Ebles marrying Gerloc, perhaps about 936, in a match that may have been arranged by William I of Normandy.

With Gerloc, William had at least one child whose filiation is clearly attested:

- William, his successor in Aquitaine. He abdicated to the abbey of Saint-Cyprien in Poitiers and left the government to his son.
- Adelaide, who married Hugh Capet (Note: According to Bouchard, Adelaide was not from Poitou/Aquitaine. A document from 982, used as "proof" of Adelaide's origins, indicates a sister (Adela) of William IV of Aquitaine marrying a Duke Eblo, which was later altered to state Duke Hugh Capet. Bouchard states the document seems disorganised and that both Duke Eblo and his wife Adela were already dead by 982. Bouchard therefore states Adelaide's ancestry is unknown.)

== See also ==
- Duke of Aquitaine

== Sources ==
- Bouchard, Constance Brittain (2001). Those of My Blood: Creating Noble Families in Medieval Francia. University of Pennsylvania Press.
- Hagger, Mark S. (2017). Norman Rule in Normandy, 911-1144. The Boydell Press.
- McKitterick, Rosamond (1999). The Frankish Kingdoms under the Carolingians, 751-987. Longman.
- Painter, Sidney (1956). "Castellans of the Plain of Poitou in the Eleventh and Twelfth Centuries". Speculum. 31 (2 Apr). The University of Chicago Press: 243–257. doi:10.2307/2849411. JSTOR 2849411. S2CID 162306871.

William III of Aquitaine House of Poitiers Born: 915 Died: 3 April 963
Preceded by Ebalus	Duke of Aquitaine; 935–963	Succeeded by William IV
Preceded by Ebalus	Count of Poitiers; 935–963	Succeeded by William IV
