= Miracula Martialis =

Collection of miracle reports

The Miracula Martialis is a collection of miracle reports written in Latin. It is the earliest collection of miracles purportedly worked through the intervention of Saint Martial, a 3rd-century bishop of Limoges, and a key piece of his then still growing hagiography. It was initially compiled in the late 7th or early 8th century and expanded once shortly after 832 and again shortly after 854. The oldest miracles it records took place in the 7th century.

The Miracula is a potentially useful historical source for a very obscure period in Aquitanian history. For example, the earliest section of the Miracula, possibly from the late 7th century, offers a portrayal of the count of the palace Ebroin (died 680) at odds with that of the contemporary Passio Leudegarii. While the Passio is negative, the Miracula gives a positive account of Ebroin. The Miracula also gives a unique account of an event in 675: the Aquitanian official Lupus attempted to make himself the king of an independent Aquitaine (ad sedem regam se adstare, "to stand himself on a royal seat").

== Editions ==
- Full text in:

- Catalogus codicum hagiographicorum latinorum Bibliothecae nationalis Parisiensis, I (1889), 198–209.
- "Le livre des miracles de Saint-Martial, texte latin inédit du IX^{e} siècle", ed. François Arbellot, Bulletin de la Société archéologique et historique du Limousin 36 (1889), 339–375.

- Extracts in:

- Ex Miraculis S. Martialis, ed. Oswald Holder-Egger. MGH SS 15 (Hanover, 1887), 280–283.
