= Adelaide of Aquitaine =

Queen of the Franks from 987 to 996

Queen consort of the Franks
- Tenure: 987–996
- Born: c. 945/952
- Died: 1004
- Spouse: Hugh Capet (m. 969; died 996)
- Issue: Hedwig, Countess of Mons; Robert II of France; Gisèle, Countess of Ponthieu
- House: Poitiers
- Father: William III of Aquitaine
- Mother: Gerloc of Normandy

Adbelahide, Adele, Adela or Adelaide of Aquitaine (also known as Adelaide of Poitiers; c. 945 or 952 – 1004), was the queen of France by marriage to King Hugh Capet (c. 939 – 14 October 996). Adelaide and Hugh were the founders of the Capetian dynasty of France, which ruled France until the 18th and 19th centuries. As queen, Adelaide had some extent of influence over her husband's governance of France. Adelaide is typically only briefly mentioned in connection to her husband, Hugh, and her son Robert II.

== Life ==
Adelaide was the daughter of Duke William III of Aquitaine and Gerloc (Adele), daughter of Rollo of Normandy. (Note: According to Bouchard, Adelaide was not from Aquitaine. A document from 982, used as "proof" of Adelaide's origins, indicates a sister (Adela) of William IV of Aquitaine marrying a Duke Eblo, which was later altered to mean Duke Hugh Capet. Bouchard states the document seems disorganized and that both Duke Eblo and his wife Adela were already dead by 982. She concludes Adelaide's ancestry is unknown.)

On 29 May 987, after the death of Louis V, the last Carolingian king of France, Hugh was elected the new king by an assembly of Frankish magnates at Senlis. The couple were proclaimed king and queen at Senlis and blessed at Noyon on 1 June 987. They became the founders of the Capetian dynasty of France. Apparently, Hugh trusted in Adelaide's judgement and allowed her to take part in government. Hugh's recognition of Adelaide as socia et particeps nostril regni, roughly translated to "associate and participator in our kingdom", demonstrates his apparent acclaim for Adelaide.

Adelaide's son Robert's tutor Gerbert of Aurillac came into conflict in the late 990's with Arnulf, the archbishop of Reims. Gerbert took refuge with Otto III, the new Holy Roman emperor, and Adelaide attempted to recall the former to Reims, but Gerbert reluctantly resisted this command in a letter dated to the spring of 997, citing concerns for his personal safety and the stability of the French kingdom had he returned to challenge Arnulf for the archbishopric.

== Children ==
Adelaide and Hugh had at least three children that lived to adulthood:

- Hedwig, Countess of Mons (or Hadevide, or Avoise) (c. 969–after 1013), wife of Reginar IV, Count of Mons
- Robert II (972–1031), the future king of France. Crowned co-king in 987, in order to consolidate the new dynasty.
- Gisèle, Countess of Ponthieu (c. 970–1002), wife of Hugh I, Count of Ponthieu.

== Sources ==
- Bouchard, Constance Brittain (2001). Those of My Blood: Creating Noble Families in Medieval Francia. University of Pennsylvania Press.

French royalty
Preceded by Emma of Italy	Queen consort of the Franks; 987–996	Succeeded by Rozala of Lombardy
