= Desiderius of Aquitaine =

Desiderius (died 587) was a Gallo-Roman dux in the Kingdom of the Franks during the reigns of Chilperic I and Guntram. He served Chilperic as Duke of Aquitaine and was his greatest general.

When Sigebert I of Austrasia died in 575, Chilperic sent Desiderius to invade his kingdom, but Guntram of Burgundy sent the patrician Mummolus against him and Desiderius was defeated and forced to retreat, leaving Austrasia to Sigebert's son Childebert II. The following year, with the armies of Bladast and Berulf, surrounded the territory of Bourges. They subsequently devastated the Touraine, as recorded by the then bishop of Tours, Gregory, the historian.

In 583, Chilperic gave the province of Aquitaine to him and Bladast and sent them into Vasconia with a large army. They were defeated and most of the army destroyed.

When Chilperic died (584), Desiderius went to Toulouse to secure the treasure imparted to Chilperic's daughter Riguntha, betrothed to Reccared, son of Leovigild, King of Spain. The next year (584), Desiderius made peace with Guntram. The chronicle of John of Biclar reports how around 587 Frankish forces attacked the recently enthroned king Reccared of Visigothic Spain, but were defeated, their general, Desiderius, being killed in battle. His widow Tetradia, daughter of a noblewoman and a peasant, was taken to court by her former husband Eulalius, from whom she had fled with a large portion of his fortune. The stolen property was returned to Eulalius and Desiderius' children by her were delegitimised.

== Sources ==
- Gregory of Tours. Historia Francorum. translated Earnest Brehaut, 1916.
- Lewis, Archibald R. "The Dukes in the Regnum Francorum, A.D. 550-751." Speculum, Vol. 51, No 3 (July 1976), pp 381–410.
