= Bladast =

Bladast or Bladastes was a Frankish dux during the reigns of Chilperic I and Chlothar II.

In 583 or 581, Chilperic I gave the province of Aquitaine to Bladast and Desiderius and sent them into Vasconia with the Aquitainian army. They were defeated.

== Sources ==
- Gregory of Tours. Historia Francorum. translated Earnest Brehaut, 1916.
- Lewis, Archibald R. "The Dukes in the Regnum Francorum, A.D. 550-751." Speculum, Vol. 51, No 3 (July 1976), pp 381–410.
- Collins, Roger. "The Basques in Aquitaine and Navarre: Problems of Frontier Government." War and Society in the Middle Ages: Essays in Honour of J. O. Prestwich. edd. J. Gillingham and J. C. Holt. Cambridge: Boydell Press, 1984. Reprinted in Law, Culture and Regionalism in Early Medieval Spain. Variorum, 1992. ISBN 0-86078-308-1.
