= History of Limousin =

Coat of arms of Limousin

Map of historical Limousin

The history of Limousin (Occitan: Lemosin), one of the traditional provinces of France, reaches back to Celtic and Roman times. The region surrounds the city of Limoges (Occitan: Limòtges). Limousin is located in the foothills of the western edge of the Massif Central, with cold weather in the winter. Its name is derived from the name of a Celtic tribe, the Lemovices, whose main sanctuary was recently found in Tintignac and became a major site for Celtic study which were found such as the carnyces in the whole Celtic world.

During the 10th century, Limousin was divided into many seigneuries; the most important of them, located in the southern part of the region, were the vicomtés of Limoges, Comborn (in present-day Corrèze), Ventadour (today Ussel and Plateau de Millevaches), and Turenne. The northernmost part of Limousin belonged to the County of La Marche, while the bishops of Limoges controlled most of present-day Haute-Vienne. Such political fragmentation led to the construction of many castles, whose ruins still evoke memories of that historical period.

In 1199, King Richard I of England was fatally wounded by a crossbow bolt during his siege of Château de Châlus-Chabrol, about 30 kilometres (19 mi) southwest of Limoges.

The region was reconstituted during the Fifth Republic as part of decentralization efforts by the French government.

== See also ==
- Limousin (province), former province of France under the Ancien Régime
- Limousin (administrative region), the former administrative region of southwest-central France
