= Raymond Pons of Toulouse =

Count of Toulouse

Raymond Pons (Regimundus Pontio; died after 944), who may be numbered Raymond III or Pons I, was the count of Toulouse from 924.

In 932, Raymond Pons travelled north with his uncle Count Ermengol of Rouergue and Duke Sancho IV Garcés of Gascony to do homage to King Rudolph.

In 936, Raymond Pons helped found the monastery of Chanteuges. Between 940 and 941, he controlled Auvergne. In 944, when Hugh the Great and King Louis IV entered Aquitaine, the former met Raymond at Nevers and confirmed his titles while the Toulousain returned with the king to the royal court.

Raymond Pons married a daughter of Duke García II of Gascony, who was either the same person as his known wife Gersenda or a distinct earlier wife. His successor was another Raymond, probably his son.

== Sources ==
- Lewis, A. R. (1965). The Development of Southern French and Catalan Society, 718–1050. Austin: University of Texas Press.
