= Count of Poitiers =

French noble title

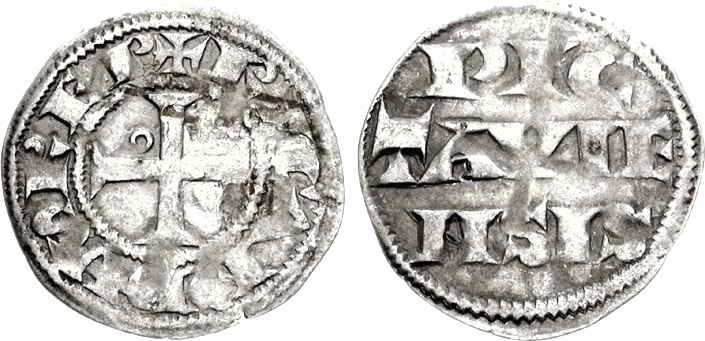
Coin of Richard the Lionheart as Count of Poitiers; it bears the inscriptions RICARDVS REX / PICTAVIENSIS.

Among the people who have borne Carolingian Counts the title of Count of Poitiers (French: Comte de Poitiers, Latin: Comes Pictaviensis; or Poitou, in what is now France but in the Middle Ages became part of Aquitaine) are:

- Bodilon
- Warinus (638–677), son of Bodilon
- Hatton (735–778)
- Bernard I (814–828)
- Renaud (795–843)
- Bernard II (840–844)
- Emenon or Emeno (828 – 839), brother of Bernard II
- Ranulph I (839–866)
- Ranulph II (866–890), son of Ranulph I
- William I, Duke of Aquitaine
- William II, Duke of Aquitaine
- Ebalus (or Ebles Manzer) (890–892) (illegitimate son of Ranulph II) (first reign– 890–893) (second reign– 902–935)
- Aymar (892–902) (son of Emenon)
- Ebalus (or Ebles Manzer) (restored) (902–935)
- William III (935–963)
- William IV (963–995)
- William V (969–1030)
- William VI (1030–1038)
- Odo (Eudes) (1038–1039)
- William VII (1039–1058)
- William VIII (1058–1086)
- William IX (1086–1126)
- William X (1127–1137)
- Eleanor, Duchess of Aquitaine
  - Louis VII of France (1137–1152) obtained title through marriage to Eleanor
  - Henry II of England (1152–1169) obtained title through marriage to Eleanor
    - William, styled Count of Poitiers (1153–1156) son of Eleanor and Henry II of England
- Richard I (1169–1199)
