= William II of Aquitaine =

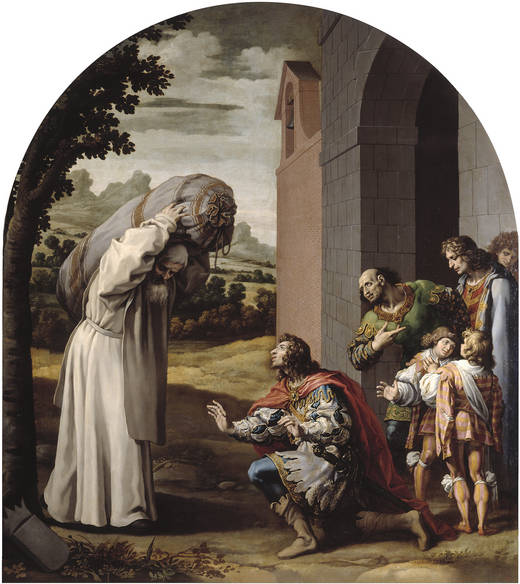
The submission of Guillaume II of Aquitaine, by V. Carducci (17th c.). Madrid, Prado museum

William II the Young (died 13 December 926) was the Count of Auvergne and Duke of Aquitaine from 918 to his death, succeeding his uncle William I.

== Military support for Rudolph of France and eventual revolt against Rudolph ==
William was son of the Acfred I of Carcassonne and Adelinde, William I's sister and Bernard Plantapilosa's daughter. Immediately after succeeding his uncle, he made war on the Burgundians and Normans, who refused to accept Rudolph as king of France. His support of the king, however, was insincere. He later revolted and Rudolph led an army into Aquitaine, but was called back to defend the Rhine from the Magyars. William died soon after.

== Vassal of the Duke of Burgundy ==
In 924 the duke Raoul of Burgundy came up to the Loire river and William was forced to make his submission to him. Upon which Raoul, relieved that such a powerful vassal accepted his suzerainty, gave him back the counties of Berry and Macon and the town of Bourges.

- Dukes of Aquitaine family tree

== Sources ==
- Nouvelle Biographie Générale. Paris, 1859.
- Memoirs of the Queens of France. Anne Forbes Bush.

Preceded by William I	Duke of Aquitaine; 918–926	Succeeded by Acfred
