= William I of Aquitaine =

William I
- Duke of Aquitaine
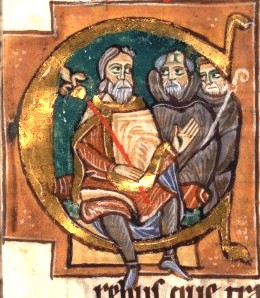
- Born: 22 March 875
- Died: 6 July 918 (aged 43)
- Spouse: Engelberga of Provence
- Issue: Engelberga unknown daughter
- Father: Bernard Plantapilosa

William I (22 March 875 – 6 July 918), commonly called the Pious, was the Count of Auvergne from 886 and Duke of Aquitaine from 893, succeeding the Poitevin ruler Ebalus Manser. He made numerous monastic foundations, most important among them the foundation of Cluny Abbey on 11 September 910.

== Life ==
William was son of Bernard Plantapilosa and Ermengard. Sometime before 898, William married the Bosonid Angilberga, daughter of Boso of Provence and Ermengard of Italy.

By inheritance, William was the ruler of Auvergne and the Limousin. He conquered Poitou and Aquitaine in 893 on behalf of Ebalus Manser. He kept the latter for himself and was proclaimed duke. His possessions extended from Austrasia to Toulouse and included the Autunois and Mâconnais.

In 909, William founded the Benedictine abbey of Cluny that would become an important political and religious centre. In the original charter to found the abbey, William stipulated that there would be no outside control over the abbey, which would directly answerable only to the pope (see Clunian reforms). This was especially striking since most monasteries were privately owned and the appointment of abbots and officials was left to that family or individual, leading to the appointment of untrained and unordained abbots and officials. William also nominated Cluny's first abbot, Berno of Baume.

A sign of William's independence of rule in Aquitaine is that he had a deniers minted in his own name at Brioude. He was buried in the monastery of Saint-Julien. William had no sons of his own and was succeeded by a nephew, William the Younger, son of his sister Adelinda by Acfred I of Carcassonne.

== Marriage and issue ==
William married Engelberga, daughter of Boso of Provence and Ermengard they had:

- Engelberga
- Possibly another daughter

== See also ==
- Dukes of Aquitaine family tree

== Sources ==
- Bouchard, Constance (2000). "Burgundy and Provence, 879-1032". In Reuter, Timothy (ed.). The New Cambridge Medieval History. Vol. III: c.900-c.1024. Cambridge University Press.
- Nouvelle Biographie Générale. Paris, 1859.
- Rouche, Michel. "Private life conquers state and society," in A History of Private Life, Vol. I, Paul Veyne, ed. Harvard University Press, 1987. ISBN 0-674-39974-9

Preceded by Ebalus	Duke of Aquitaine after 893–918	Succeeded by William II
