= House of Armagnac =

French noble family

Armagnac

The House of Armagnac was a French noble house established in 961 by Bernard I, Count of Armagnac. It achieved its greatest importance in the fourteenth and fifteenth centuries.

The House of Armagnac, at the end of the thirteenth century, was not yet powerful enough to play a political role beyond its possessions. The House of Toulouse, which ruled over the large southeast of France, was defeated by the Capetians during the Albigensian Crusade, but local dynasties, like the House of Foix, the Counts of Comminges and the House of Albret, were gaining momentum.

At the beginning of the fourteenth century, the Armagnacs reached the rank of great feudal lords with the legacy of the County of Rodez. This heritage, combined with its Gascon lands, allowed the family to hold a rank of major importance in the heart of the nobility and, therefore, to ally itself to the royal House of France.

Between the fourteenth and fifteenth century, the Armagnacs came into possession of other territories including the counties of Charolais, La Marche, Pardiac, Castres, the land of Nemours elevated to a duchy, and the Carladez. After being attached to the Kings of France during the fourteenth century, the Counts of Armagnac sought to emancipate themselves (money title Dei gracia) from the Royal Trust in the fifteenth century and took an active part in the last struggles of feudalism in France. King Louis XI broke their desire for independence by force and the Armagnacs would never recover from their defeat. They declined and became extinct in the sixteenth century.

The House of Armagnac's most famous member was Bernard VII, Count of Armagnac and Rodez, Constable of France, leader of the Armagnacs opposed to the Burgundians during the Hundred Years' War.

The House of Armagnac is from the lineage of the former Dukes of Gascony known since the eighth or ninth century.

== History ==
=== Origins ===
Garcia II Sanchez of Gascony (†930), Duke of Gascony, divided the duchy between his three sons:

- Sancho IV Garcés of Gascony († 955), Duke of Gascony
- William Garcés of Fézensac († 960) received the County Fézensac.
- Arnold I of Astarac received Astarac.

=== The Count of Armagnac ===
William Garcés of Fézensac detached from his land the County of Armagnac, to give to his younger son Bernard, who founded the first house of Armagnac. Bernard II, younger son of Bernard I, was briefly Count of Biscay—a title which he inherited from his mother—but was deposed by his cousin Guy Geoffroy Guillaume VIII, Duke of Aquitaine. In 1140 the elder branch of Fézensac ended, which benefited the counts of Armagnac: a legacy that initiated the power of the family.

=== Heritage of the Count of Rodez ===
Following the acquisition through marriage of the County of Rodez between the end of thirteenth century and the early fourteenth century, the counts of Armagnac, John I and John II, came closer to the court of France.

John I married his daughter, Joan of Armagnac to John, Duke of Berry, who then married his daughter, Bonne of Berry to Bernard VII, Count of Armagnac, who then married his daughter, Bonne d'Armagnac to Charles d'Orléans. At the death of Louis d'Orléans, he succeeded him in the war against the Burgundians, becoming the head of the party that became that of the Armagnacs. To increase his power, he dispossessed the cadet branches of the family, recovering the Fezensaguet and Pardiac, but failed with Comminges. He died in 1418, leaving two sons:

- John IV, Count of Armagnac and Rodez.
- Bernard, Count of Pardiac, head of a cadet branch that will later inherit by marriage Nemours and La Marche.

=== The Armagnac and the Burgundians ===
From the assassination of Louis d'Orléans in 1407 to the Treaty of Arras in 1435, the House of Armagnac supported French interests against the Dukes of Burgundy allied with the English. The Armagnacs represented the armed wing of France.

=== The Armagnac struggle for independence against Capetian power ===
After serving the Capetians during the fourteenth century and the beginning of the fifteenth, the Armagnacs were openly seeking to emancipate themselves. They assumed that the role they played during the Hundred Years' War gave them greater rights than the rest of the nobility. They had not counted on the pugnacity of King Louis XI.

=== The defeat and end of the Armagnacs ===
At the end of the fifteenth century, the Armagnacs were claiming sovereign rights (coin money, take the qualification Counts by the grace of God), incurring the wrath of King Louis XI. In 1473, John V, Count of Armagnac was besieged and killed in Lectoure by French troops led by Cardinal Jean Jouffroy, Archbishop of Albi, who murdered the count in front of his wife, pillaged, and burned everything, and left alive only the Countess Jeanne de Foix (daughter of Gaston IV, Count of Foix). The Countess was stripped of her jewels and dragged, even though she was seven months pregnant, into the castle of Buzet-sur-Tarn which had been turned into a state prison. There King Louis XI ordered the extinction of the House of Armagnac. Cardinal Jouffroy ordered the apothecaries and the soldiers to force the unfortunate Countess to drink a potion to destroy her unborn child. Jeanne de Foix's child was stillborn in April 1473. Jeanne died 10 February 1476.

Jacques d'Armagnac, Duke of Nemours and Count John V were both targets of King Louis XI's deadly vengeance against the House of Armagnac. They were two of the last three grandsons and male heirs of Bernard VII, Count of Armagnac.

The only male survivor of the House of Armagnac was, Charles I, Count of Armagnac, Viscount Fezensaguet, who was born in 1425 and died without issue 3 June 1497 in Castelnau-de-Montmiral at the age of 72 years. Charles I of Armagnac was particularly troublesome and King Louis XI had him confined in prison for thirteen years, from 1472 to 1485. With King Louis XI having disposed of the House of Armagnac, Alain I of Albret occupied the county of Armagnac.

== Coats of arms ==
Counts of Armagnac

Counts of Armagnac and Rodez

Counts of Pardiac, de La Marche and Dukes of Nemours
1. Counts of Armagnac : d'argent au lion de gueules
2. Counts of Armagnac and Rodez : écartelé, aux 1 et 4 d'argent au lion de gueules, aux 2 et 3 de gueules au lion ou lion léopardé d'or
3. Counts of Pardiac, La Marche, and later Dukes of Nemours : écartelé, aux 1 et 4 d'argent au lion de gueules, aux 2 et 3 de gueules au lion ou lion léopardé d'or au lambel d'azur sur le tout

== Genealogy of House d'Armagnac ==
Garcia II; Count of Gascony († 926)
William Garcés of Fézensac; Count of Fézensac († 960)
Odo; Count of Fézensac († 985)	Bernard I le Louche; Count d'Armagnac († 995)
Bernard-Odon; Count of Fézensac († 1020)	Gérald I Trancaléon; Count d'Armagnac († 1020)
Aymeric I comte de Fézensac († 1032)	Arnaud I vicomte de Lomagne
Astanove I comte de Fézensac († 1064)	Bernard II; Tumapaler; Count d'Armagnac († 1090)	Odon I vicomte de Lomagne († 1085)
Aymeric II comte de Fézensac († 1103)	Géraud II comte d'Armagnac († 1103)	Odon II vicomte de Lomagne († 1091)
Astanove II comte de Fézensac († 1140)	Bernard III comte d'Armagnac († 1110)	Vézian I vicomte de Lomagne († 1137)
Bernard III comte de Bigorre († 1112)	Anicelle comtesse de Fézensac	Géraud III comte d'Armagnac († 1160)	Odon III vicomte de Lomagne († 1178)
Bernard IV comte d'Armagnac († 1193)	Mascarose	Odon seigneur de Firmacon	Vezian II vicomte de Lomagne († 1221)
Géraud IV comte d'Armagnac († 1215)	Bernard I vcte de Fézensaguet († 1202)
Roger vicomte de Fézensaguet	Gérald V comte d'Armagnac († 1219)	Odon IV vicomte de Lomagne († 1240)
Pierre Gérard cte d'Armagnac († 1241)	Bernard V cte d'Armagnac († 1243)	Mascarose I ctesse d'Armagnac († 1255)	Arnaud Odon cte d'Armagnac († 1265)	Escaronne de Blaziert
Gérald VI; Count d'Armagnac († 1285)	Eskivat de Chabanais comte d'Armagnac et de Bigorre († 1283)	Mascarose II comte d'Armagnac († 1256)	Vezian III vicomte de Lomagne († 1280)
Bernard VI; Count d'Armagnac and of Rodez († 1319)	Gaston cte de Fézensaguet († 1326)
John I Count d'Armagnac and of Rodez († 1373)	Géraud I cte de Fézensaguet († 1339)
John II; Count d'Armagnac and of Rodez († 1384)	John I Count of Fézensaguet († 1390)	Géraud II; Count of Pardiac and of Fézensaguet († 1401)
John III; Count d'Armagnac and of Rodez († 1391)	Bernard VII; Count d'Armagnac and Rodez († 1418)	John II; Count of Pardiac and of Fézensaguet († 1402)
John IV; Count d'Armagnac and of Rodez († 1450)	Bernard; Count of Pardiac and la Marche; Duke of Nemours († 1462)
John V Count d'Armagnac and of Rodez († 1473)	Charles I Count d'Armagnac and of Rodez († 1497)	Jacques; Count of Pardiac and la Marche; Duke of Nemours († 1477)
Jean; Count of Pardiac; Duke of Nemours († 1500)	Louis; Count of Pardiac and of Guise; Duke of Nemours († 1503)
