= 960 =

Calendar year

960 in various calendars
- Gregorian calendar: 960; CMLX
- Ab urbe condita: 1713
- Armenian calendar: 409; ԹՎ ՆԹ
- Assyrian calendar: 5710
- Balinese saka calendar: 881–882
- Bengali calendar: 366–367
- Berber calendar: 1910
- Buddhist calendar: 1504
- Burmese calendar: 322
- Byzantine calendar: 6468–6469
- Chinese calendar: 己未年 (Earth Goat); 3657 or 3450 — to — 庚申年 (Metal Monkey); 3658 or 3451
- Coptic calendar: 676–677
- Discordian calendar: 2126
- Ethiopian calendar: 952–953
- Hebrew calendar: 4720–4721
- Hindu calendars
- Vikram Samvat: 1016–1017
- Shaka Samvat: 881–882
- Kali Yuga: 4060–4061
- Holocene calendar: 10960
- Iranian calendar: 338–339
- Islamic calendar: 348–349
- Japanese calendar: Tentoku 4 (天徳４年)
- Javanese calendar: 860–861
- Julian calendar: 960; CMLX
- Korean calendar: 3293
- Minguo calendar: 952 before ROC 民前952年
- Nanakshahi calendar: −508
- Seleucid era: 1271/1272 AG
- Thai solar calendar: 1502–1503
- Tibetan calendar: ས་མོ་ལུག་ལོ་ (female Earth-Sheep); 1086 or 705 or −67 — to — ལྕགས་ཕོ་སྤྲེ་ལོ་ (male Iron-Monkey); 1087 or 706 or −66

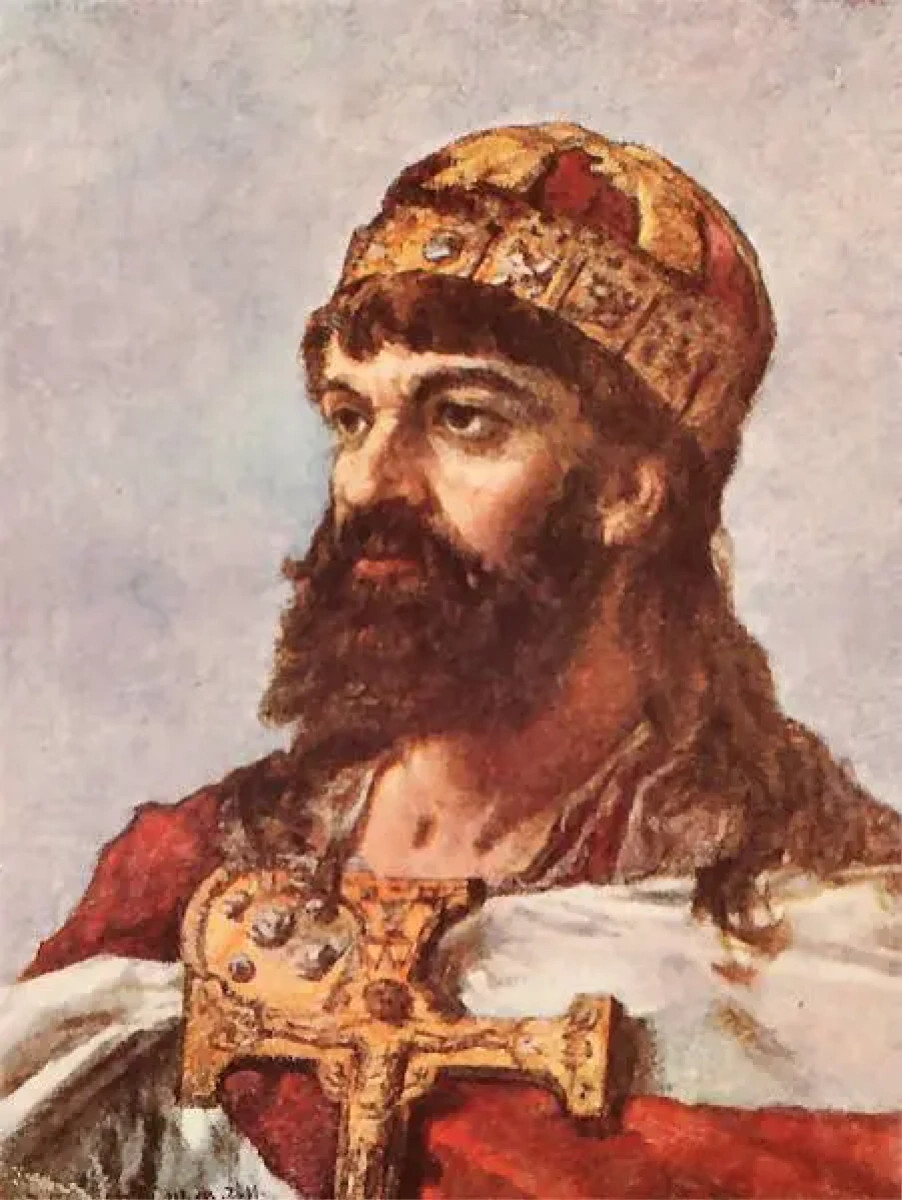
Prince Mieszko I of Poland (ca. 930–992)

Year 960 (CMLX) was a leap year starting on Sunday of the Julian calendar. It was the 960th year of the Common Era (CE) and Anno Domini (AD) designations, the 960th year of the 1st millennium, the 60th year of the 10th century, and the first year of the 960s decade.

== Events ==
=== By place ===
==== Byzantine Empire ====
- Summer – Siege of Chandax: A Byzantine fleet with an expeditionary force (comprising about 50,000 men) under Nikephoros Phokas lands on Crete. Nikephoros defeats the Muslim resistance and begins a siege at the capital of Chandax. He decides to blockade the city for the winter, while his engineers begin to construct siege engines. Emir Abd al-Aziz ibn Shu'ayb sends for aid by the Fatimids in Ifriqiya and the Caliphate of Córdoba (modern Spain).
- November 8 – Battle of Andrassos: The Byzantines under Leo Phokas the Younger defeat the Hamdanid army (30,000 men) in an ambush in the passages of the Cilician mountains, in south Asia Minor (modern-day Turkey). Emir Sayf al-Dawla barely manages to escape, and returns to Aleppo with only 300 horsemen. The Hamdanids can no longer afford to raid in Anatolia, which is a turning point in the Arab-Byzantine wars in the East.

==== Europe ====
- Mieszko I, a duke of the Piast Dynasty, becomes prince (de facto ruler) of Poland on the death of his father Siemomysł. Mieszko continues to subdue the neighbouring tribes under his control. Two obstacles to this plan are the Western Slav tribal group, the Veleti (also known as the Wilzi or "Wolf people") who are raiding Mieszko's lands for plunder; and the Saxon border dukes, who are pushing eastwards in search of new lands to conquer.
- Harald Bluetooth, king of Denmark, consolidates his rule over Jutland and Zealand. He adopts Christianity, erecting a carved stone at Jelling to honour his parents. It features a runic inscription (best-known in Denmark) and an image of Christ surrounded by interlace. The other Scandinavian kingdoms slowly convert to Christianity (approximate date).
- June/July – Adalbert II, co-ruler and the son of King Berengar II, with the support of Duke Hugh of Tuscany, invades the Papal States under Pope John XII. With Lombard forces closing in on Rome, a papal delegation is sent to King Otto I (the Great) to appeal for assistance.
- Autumn – Oberto I, margrave of the Obertenghi family, takes refuge in Germany. He travels with influential Italian leaders to the Saxon court of Otto I to intervene in Italy to protect him from Berengar II.
- Richard I (the Fearless), duke of Normandy, marries Emma of Paris. She is the daughter of Hugh the Great, former Duke of the Franks. The union gives him a permanent status to the House of Capet.

==== England ====
- Dunstan receives the pallium as archbishop of Canterbury from Pope John XII. He reforms monasteries and enforces the rule of Saint Benedict: poverty, chastity and obedience for monks.

==== Africa ====
- The Kingdom of Aksum (modern Eritrea) is destroyed by Beta Israel invaders, under the leadership of Queen Gudit (approximate date).

==== Asia ====
- February 4 – The Song Dynasty is established at Kaifeng by the 33-year-old military leader Zhao Kuangyin. He begins to unify the empire by conquering other lands and becomes the first emperor, called as Taizu of Song. The Song Dynasty will rule northern China for over 300 years (until 1279).

=== By topic ===
==== Religion ====
- Dunstan founds the Church of St. Dunstan in East Sussex.

== Births ==
- Abu Nasr Mansur, Persian mathematician (approximate date)
- Aimoin, French monk and chronicler (approximate date)
- Arnulf II (the Younger), Frankish nobleman (or 961)
- Bagrat III, king of Abkhazia (Georgia) (d. 1014)
- Bernward, bishop of Hildesheim (approximate date)
- Constantine VIII, Byzantine emperor (d. 1028)
- Eckard I, German nobleman (approximate date)
- Fan Kuan, Chinese landscape painter (approximate date)
- Gershom ben Judah, German rabbi (approximate date)
- Gormflaith ingen Murchada, Irish queen (d. 1030)
- Gotthard, bishop of Hildesheim (d. 1038)
- Hugh III, French nobleman (approximate date)
- Indra Pala, king of Kamarupa (India) (d. 990)
- Li, empress consort of the Song Dynasty (d. 1004)
- Mazu, Chinese fisherman's daughter and worshipped as Taoist goddess (approximate date)
- Sharaf al-Dawla, Buyid emir of Kerman and Fars (approximate date)
- Sigurd the Stout, Viking nobleman (earl) (approximate date)
- Sweyn Forkbeard, king of Denmark and England (d. 1014)
- Xu You, official and court minister of Southern Tang

== Deaths ==
- May 31 – Fujiwara no Morosuke, Japanese statesman (b. 909)
- June 15 – Eadburh of Winchester, English princess and saint
- June 23 – Feng Yanji, chancellor of Southern Tang (b. 903)
- August 12 – Li Gu, chancellor of Later Zhou (b. 903)
- Ælfric, bishop of Hereford (approximate date)
- Adele of Vermandois, Frankish noblewoman
- Arnold I of Astarac, Frankish nobleman
- Bernard the Dane, Viking nobleman (approximate date)
- Časlav, prince of Serbia (approximate date)
- Emmanuel I, patriarch of the Church of the East
- Fulk II (the Good), Frankish nobleman
- Gao Baorong, king of Nanping (Ten Kingdoms) (b. 920)
- George II, king of Abkhazia (Georgia)
- Gopala II, ruler of the Pala Empire (India)
- Guan Tong, Chinese landscape painter
- Justan I ibn Marzuban, Sallarid ruler
- Lhachen Dpalgyimgon, king of Mauyul (Tibet)
- Murchadh mac Aodha, king of Uí Maine (Ireland)
- Ratna Pala, king of Kamarupa (India) (b. 920)
- Siemomysł, duke of the Piast Dynasty (Poland)
- William Garés, Frankish nobleman
- Yelü Lihu, prince of the Khitan Empire (b. 911)
