= Bernart Arnaut d'Armagnac =

Troubadour

Bernart Arnaut d'Armagnac (died 1226), also Bernard Arnaud, was a troubadour and from 1217 the Count of Armagnac in opposition to his brother, Gerald V, who inherited it from the childless Gerald IV. Bernart and Gerald were both sons of Bernard de Fézensaguet.

Sometime before 1217, Bernart Arnaut had a literary correspondence with the trobairitz Lombarda. The background (razo) to this exchange (tenso) is described in Lombarda's vida. Bernart, after visiting and befriending Lombarda, left her (probably in Toulouse) without seeing her for a last time. He then sent her his song Lombards volgr'eu eser per Na Lombarda. Lombarda responded with Nom volgr' aver per Bernard Na Bernarda. Their exchange has inspired many feminist readings. Bernart begins by taking the name "Lombards" in honour of his lady; Lombarda responds by calling herself "Bernarda". If Bernart's taking of his ladyfriend's name is regarded as a patriarchal move to subsume a woman's identity in her man, then Lombarda's response will be seen as an assertion of her individualism. Bernart also refers to Jordan III of L'Isle-Jourdain in his poem.

== Bibliography ==
- Joseph Anglade, Les troubadours de Toulouse (Toulouse: Privat, 1928) pp. 121–123
- Matilda Tomaryn Bruckner, Laurie Shepard, and Sarah White, Songs of the Women Troubadours (New York: Garland Publishing, 1995) pp. 70–73, 169–70
- Sarah Kay, "Derivation, derived rhyme and the trobairitz" in The voice of the trobairitz: perspectives on the women troubadours, ed. William D. Paden (Philadelphia: University of Pennsylvania Press, 1989) pp. 157–182
- Tilde Sankovitch, "Lombarda's reluctant mirror: speculum of another poet", in The Voice of the Trobairitz: Perspectives on the Women Troubadours, ed. William D. Paden (Philadelphia: University of Pennsylvania Press, 1989) pp. 183–193
