= Alfonso VIII's invasion of Gascony =

Alfonso VIII of Castile invaded the Duchy of Gascony in 1205, claiming it as the dowry of his wife, Eleanor of England. Gascony was held at the time by Eleanor's brother, John, King of England. Alfonso controlled most of Gascony in 1205–1206, but he failed to take Bordeaux by siege and the enterprise was abandoned in 1207–1208.

== Background ==
Alfonso had acquired a border with Gascony in 1200, when he annexed Guipúzcoa from Navarre, thus cutting off the latter from access to the sea. In response, Navarre signed two treaties establishing an alliance with England and giving them access to the sea through Bayonne in 1201 (Chinon) and 1202 (Angoulême).

Alfonso and Eleanor married in 1170. Her father, Henry II of England, promised Gascony as her dowry, although it was to be retained by her mother, Eleanor of Aquitaine, for the rest of her life. On the death of his wife's mother in April 1204, Alfonso asserted his claim on Gascony.

By October, Alfonso had adopted the title "lord of Gascony" (dominus Vasconie) and issued charters to religious houses in Gascony. He had support for his claim from Philip II of France, who was also at war with England. He recruited the count of Armagnac, Gerald IV; Viscounts Gaston VI of Béarn, Loup-Garsie of Orthe and Arnaud-Raymond of Tartas; and Bishops Bernard of Bayonne, Gaillard of Bazas and Fortanier of Dax to his cause. They visited him in San Sebastián in October 1204. In general, the nobility of the interior favoured Alfonso while the towns of the coast preferred the English, presumably for economic reasons. In 1205, Alfonso sent Bishop Diego of Osma on a mission to the county of La Marche, the heir to which had lost his fiancée to King John.

In response to Alfonso's recruitment campaign, the archbishop of Bordeaux, Hélie de Malemort, travelled to England in August to collect money and reinforcements. Alfonso's plans were opposed by King Sancho VII of Navarre, who placed Bayonne under his protection without prejudice to the rights of the English king. On 29 April 1205, John wrote to the leading men of Bordeaux, Bazas, La Réole and Saint-Emilion thanking them for upholding English rule. At the same time, he sent two envoys, Pierre Andron and Bernard Breuter, on a secret mission to Gascony. In August 1205, Peter II of Aragon agreed to meet with King John, probably to mediate the Gascon war. It is unclear if any meeting ever took place.

== Invasion ==
=== 1205 campaign ===
Prior to his invasion, Alfonso made a truce with the Kingdom of León. He invaded Gascony in September 1205. A private charter from 1205 refers to it as "the time when King Alfonso of Castile contended with King John of England for Gascony".

Alfonso rapidly conquered the Entre-Deux-Mers and the towns of Bourg and Blaye north of the Garonne. Dax, Orthez and Sauveterre-de-Béarn were taken. Lucas de Tuy claims he also conquered Auch. Many of the places were not taken in military action but simply sided with Alfonso. The lord of Benauges and the viscount of Fronsac went over to him, resulting in the king of England seizing one of the latter's boats at La Rochelle.

Bayonne and La Réole resisted Alfonso's advance. Part of Bayonne was burned and several ships in its harbor were destroyed. According to the Crónica de Veinte Reyes, he besieged Bayonne until its defenders agreed to surrender if Bordeaux did. He approached Bordeaux but was not prepared for such a large undertaking and did not lay siege. According to the Crónica de Veinte Reyes, he reached a truce with Bordeaux and accepted tribute. He had returned to Castile by 12 October, when he was at Burgos. His conquests were soon reversed.

=== 1206 campaign ===
Alfonso was accompanied or followed back to Castile by the bishops of Dax and Bazas, the count of Armagnac, the viscounts of Béarn and Tartas, and the lords of Lesparre (Eyquem Guilhem II), Blanquefort (Eyquem Guilhem) and Rion (Guilhem Séguin). They were present in Burgos on 22 May 1206, when he issued a charter confirming the grants made by earlier dukes of Gascony to the abbey of La Sauve-Majeure, which he had visited during the previous year's campaign. In the charter, he refers to the parts of Gascony already acquired.

Alfonso renewed the invasion in the spring of 1206. Much less is known about this second invasion. In order to free himself to concentrate on Gascon affairs, Alfonso signed the treaty of Cabreros with León in March. He also welcomed back to Castile the exiled lord Diego López II de Haro. On 13 July, he was in Vitoria. Thereafter there is no further charter issued by Alfonso until 25 November, a period of silence that probably corresponds to the siege of Bordeaux mentioned in three Gascon chronicles under the year 1206. The siege destroyed the churches of Saint-Jacques and Sainte-Madeleine as well as the hospital and many houses built outside the walls by the poor, pilgrims, clergy and monks.

A pair of safe conducts for England issued in 1206—one in March by Queen Eleanor for her sister-in-law Berengaria of Navarre and another by King John for Queen Eleanor—probably indicate efforts on the part of Castilian queen to work towards peace.

=== English reaction ===
Almost nothing is known of John's reaction to Alfonso's invasion. The Rotuli de oblatis et finibus indicate that he could not send arms to Gascony in 1206, evidently for a lack of support. There is no evidence that Hélie de Malemort returned to Gascony before the outbreak of war or during it. There are references in chancery sources from 1206 to a siege of Bourg by John's supporters.

John himself sailed into La Rochelle on 7 June. Before moving against Alfonso, he marched to support the garrison of Niort against the French. In July, he turned south, launching raids into the Saintonge. He marched on Montauban, which surrendered after a siege of fifteen days on 1 August. This victory and the continued resistance of Bordeaux induced Alfonso to retreat.

In October 1206, John and Philip signed a truce, one of the clauses of which left it open to Alfonso VIII to join the truce. It is likely that Alfonso did so. A private charter from 1207 still refers to Alfonso as ruling in Álava and as far as Dax (in Gascony). According to the Chronica latina regum Castellae, Alfonso found Gascony poor and disorderly, comparing his attempt to bring it under control to ploughing a beach. According to the Chronica:

love of his wife compelled him to persist pertinaciously in his undertaking lest she be disappointed. But at last, seeing that he could not succeed, he absolved the Gascons, both the nobles and the people of the cities, from the oath and homage by which they were bound to him.

In August 1207, King John sought an alliance with León against Castile. Castile and Navarre signed the treaty of Guadalajara with a peace term of five years on 29 October 1207. The war between England and Castile was not concluded until 1208.

On 8 March 1208, John granted a safe conduct to Diego García de Campos, Alfonso VIII's chancellor, to come into the English king's domains to negotiate on his sovereign's behalf. This has been linked to the end of Alfonso's direct involvement in Gascony, although there is no evidence that he renounced his claim. Alfonso X finally renounced the Castilian claim on 1 November 1254.

== Literature ==
=== Poetry ===
In his song Quan vei lo temps renovelar, written in the spring of 1205, the troubadour Bertran de Born lo Filhs criticizes King John for his neglect of Gascony, accusing him of "leaving his territory to the lord of Logroño" (lais sa terra al senhor del Gronh). This poem is accompanied by a razo (explanatory introduction), which states that it was written for Savaric de Mauléon and at the request of "the men of Aquitaine and the county of Poitou".

Another difficult short song, Seigner, si aguessetz regnat, by the Monge de Montaudon, seems to be addressed to Philip II and refers to his alliance with Alfonso VIII at the time when the former was invading Poitou and the latter Gascony.

The song Miei-sirventes vueilh far dels reis amdos, attributed to Bertran de Born (father of the composer of Quan vei), seems to mention the coming of King Alfonso to battle King Richard I of England, although there have been many contradictory interpretations. This song may allude to Alfonso rattling his sabre over Gascony long before 1205. On the other hand, Stefano Asperti considers the attribution to Bertran an error. He redates the work to the mid-13th century and argues that it refers to the rivalry of Alfonso X and Richard of Cornwall over the 1257 imperial election. It might be attributable to Bertran d'Alamanon.

=== Historiography ===
Castilian historiography sought to explain Alfonso VIII's failure to acquire Gascony. The most importance source for the campaign, the Chronica latina regum Castellae, suggests that he abandoned it because it was simply not worth it and he was too wise to waste more effort on it. The chronicler perceived the campaign as costing far too much in gold and men, claiming that the day he called off the effort was celebrated in Castile. Lucas de Tuy, on the other hand, claims that Alfonso returned from Gascony in glory. Rodrigo Jiménez de Rada in his De rebus Hispaniae emphasises how Alfonso pivoted to the war against the Almohads, resulting in his resounding victory at Las Navas de Tolosa in 1212. This framing was picked up by the Estoria de España and in the later Crónica de Veinte Reyes the space between the two campaigns was elided and Alfonso is said to have abandoned the siege of Bordeaux when he learned of the Almohad movements.

=== Legend ===
The Chronique of the Ménestrel de Reims, written around 1260, recounts an episode in which a king of Spain named Ferdinand invades Gascony and is defeated in battle by King Richard. This story is based on Alfonso VIII's invasion of Gascony. Asperti has suggested that the name Ferdinand may be derived from that of Alfonso's son and heir apparent at the time, the infante Ferdinand, who may have participated in events in Gascony. The story found its way into the Anonymous of Béthune, Grande Chronique de Normandie and the Hystoire de Bretagne of Pierre Le Baud.

The song Miei-sirventes vueilh far, which may date to the same period as the Ménestrel's Chronique, might be related to the growth of the legend of Richard defending Gascony from a Spanish threat.

== Sources ==
- Alvar, Carlos (1977). La poesía trovadoresca en España y Portugal. Cupsa Editorial.
- Alvira Cabrer, Martín; Buresi, Pascal (2001). "'Alphonse, par la grâce de Dieu, Roi de Castille et de Tolède, Seigneur de Gascogne': quelques remarques à propos des relations entre Castillans et Aquitains au début du XIII^{e} siècle". Civilisation Médiévale. 12 (1): 219–232.
- Alvira Cabrer, Martín (2019). "'Si Possides Amicum, in Temptatione Posside Illum': Alfonso VIII and Peter the Catholic". In Miguel Gómez; Damian Smith; Kyle C. Lincoln (eds.). King Alfonso VIII of Castile: Government, Family, and War. Fordham University Press. pp. 185–203.
- Asperti, Stefano (1998). "Miei sirventes vueilh far dels reis amdos (BdT 80,25)". Cultura Neolatina. 58 (2): 163–323.
- Boutoulle, Frédéric (2001). Société laïque en Bordelais et Bazadais des années 1070 à 1225 (pouvoirs et groupes sociaux) (PDF) (PhD dissertation). Université Michel de Montaigne, Bordeaux.
- Bowie, Colette Marie (2011). The Daughters of Henry II and Eleanor of Aquitaine: A Comparative Study of Twelfth-Century Royal Women (PDF) (PhD dissertation). University of Glasgow.
- Cerda Costabal, José Manuel (2011). "La dot gasconne d'Aliénor d'Angleterre: Entre royaume de Castille, royaume de France et royaume d'Angleterre". Cahiers de civilisation médiévale. 54: 225–242.
- Cerda Costabal, José Manuel (2026). Leonor of England: The Plantagenet Queen of Castile. Routledge.
- Gillingham, John (2001). The Angevin Empire (2nd ed.). Arnold.
- González, Julio (1960). El reino de Castilla en la época de Alfonso VIII. Vol. 1. Consejo Superior de Investigaciones Cientificas.
- Herreros Lopetegui, Susana (1998). Las tierras navarras de Ultrapuertos (siglos XII–XVI). Gobierno de Navarra.
- Labarge, Margaret Wade (1980). Gascony, England's First Colony, 1204–1453. Hamish Hamilton.
- Lacarra, José María (1973). Historia política del reino de Navarra desde sus orígenes hasta su incorporación a Castilla (PDF). Vol. 2. Editorial Aranzadi.
- Lachaud, Frédérique (2018). Jean sans Terre. Perrin.
- Lodge, Eleanor Constance (1971). Gascony Under English Rule. Kennikat Press.
- Martínez Díez, Gonzalo (1995). Alfonso VIII, rey de Castilla y Toledo. Editorial La Olmeda.
- O'Callaghan, Joseph F., ed. (2002). The Latin Chronicle of the Kings of Castile. Arizona Center for Medieval and Renaissance Studies.
- Renouard, Yves (1965). Bordeaux sous les rois d'Angleterre. Bordeaux.
- Riquer, Martín de (1975). Los trovadores: historia literaria y textos. Vol. 2. Editorial Planeta.
- Seel, Graham E. (2012). King John: An Underrated King. Anthem Press.
- Taylor, Robert A. (2015). A Bibliographical Guide to the Study of the Troubadours and Old Occitan Literature. Medieval Institute Publications.
- Turner, Ralph V. (2009). King John: England's Evil King?. History Press.
- Vincent, Nicholas (2007). "A Forgotten War: England and Navarre, 1243–4". In Bjorn Weiler; Janet Burton; Philipp Schofield (eds.). Thirteenth Century England, XI: Proceedings of the Gregynog Conference, 2005. Boydell & Brewer. pp. 109–146.
- Vincent, Nicholas (2009). John: An Evil King?. Penguin.
