= Bernard I of Armagnac =

Count of Armagnac

Bernard I (died 995), called the Cross-Eyed, was the first Count of Armagnac.

He was the second son of William Garcés of Fézensac. When William died in 960, he divided his county up, giving Fézensac to his eldest son Odo, Armagnac to Bernard, and Gaure to the youngest son Fredelon.

For his many sins, Bernard planned a pilgrimage to Jerusalem, but never accomplished the feat. Instead, he founded a basilica dedicated to Saint Orens of Auch. His son Gerald succeeded him.

Bernard eventually would return to France and would die in Normandy.

== Sources ==
- Monlezun, Jean Justin. Histoire de la Gascogne. 1846.
