= Lombarda =

Trobairitz

Lombarda in chansonnier H

Lombarda (born c. 1190) was an early 13th-century trobairitz from Toulouse (fl. 1217–1262) known only from her vida and a short tenso. Though her name has been taken to imply that she was from Lombardy, it rather indicates that she was from a banking or merchant family, since "Lombard" was used throughout Western Europe in this sense at the time. Other scholars have suggested, because of her connexion to a lord of Armagnac, that she was from Gascony.

She wrote in the trobar clus style, one of the few women to do so. Her only surviving work is tied up with her vida and a razo. According to her vida, she was noble, beautiful, charming, and learned, skilled at composing songs about fin'amors. The adjective "noble" and the honorific Na (lady) attached to her name imply that she was married and probably in her early twenties at the time of her poetic activity.

Sometime before 1217, when he claimed Armagnac, Bernart Arnaut, the brother of then-count Geraud V, visited Lombarda and befriended her. He left, however, without seeing her one last time and sent a short poem to her house. It is to this poem that Lombarda penned a response and sent it to him.

== Sources ==
- Bogin, Meg. The Women Troubadours. Scarborough: Paddington, 1976. ISBN 0-8467-0113-8.
- Bruckner, Matilda Tomaryn; Shepard, Laurie; and White, Sarah. Songs of the Women Troubadours. New York: Garland Publishing, 1995. ISBN 0-8153-0817-5.
- Egan, Margarita, ed. The Vidas of the Troubadours. New York: Garland, 1984. ISBN 0-8240-9437-9.
