= Ausejo =

- Municipality
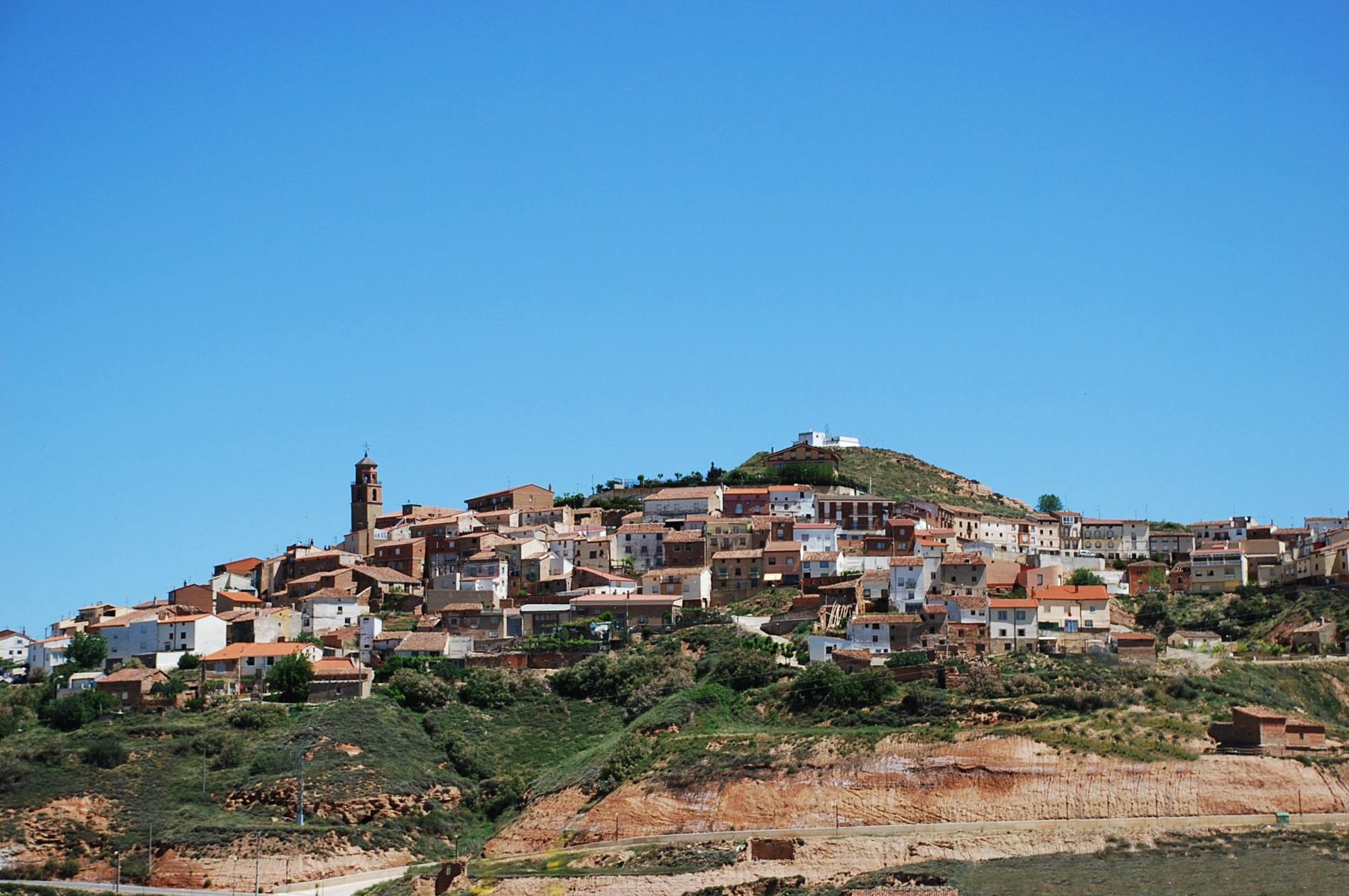
- View of Ausejo

- Coat of arms

- Location in La Rioja Location in Spain
- Coordinates: 42°20′43″N 2°10′10″W
- Country: ESP
- Autonomous Community: La Rioja
- Province: La Rioja
- Comarca: Logroño

Government
  - Mayor: Rafael Fernández Sáenz (PSOE)

Area
  - Total: 56.58 km^{2} (21.85 sq mi)
- Elevation: 560 m (1,840 ft)

Population (2025-01-01)
  - Total: 774
  - Density: 13.7/km^{2} (35.4/sq mi)
- Postal code: 26513
- Website: Official website

Ausejo is a town and municipality in the province and autonomous community of La Rioja, Spain. The municipality covers an area of 56.58 square kilometres (21.85 sq mi) and as of 2011 had a population of 1122 people.

== Geography ==
Ausejo sits on a hill previously used for mining and has ancient wineries. The village overlooks a wide expanse of terraced plains, to the south of the Ebro river. The highest section of the village is la Estrella, which stands at 754 meters.

== History ==
Henry II achieved the restitution of the areas conquered during the reign of Alfonso VIII: Logroño, Navarrete, Entrena, Ausejo and Autol. In acquiescence, the Castilian and Navarrese kings immediately signed a ten-year truce in Fitero, besides pledging the prompt delivery of the villages.

However, as Sancho appeared to be delaying the fulfillment of his obligations, the Castilian king began a campaign that allowed him to gain a number of villas and castles. Consequently, Sancho the Wise agreed to entrust the custody of Logroño, Navarrete, Ausejo, Autol and Resa de Navarra to the gentleman whom he would choose from among the three candidates that would be proposed by Alfonso VIII.

The new conflicts that would be caused by the Navarre, Sancho VII the Strong's, accession to the throne led, in October 1207, to the signing of new truces in Guadalajara, each monarch ceding three castles as a guarantee from their respective kingdoms: Irurita, Inzura and San Adrián on the part of Navarre and Clavijo, Jubera and Ausejo for the Spanish.

On October 29, 1385, Juan Ramirez de Arellano, Lord of the Cameros, dictated his will in Soria, bequeathing to his grandson, Ausejo along with Alcanadre, Murillo de Rio Leza and some Navarre towns, belonging thereafter to the population under the lordship of the counts of Murillo.

The castle was dismantled in the first half of the 19th century, and this resulted in much dispute. It had by then been significantly dilapidated so its masonry was needed for the repair of the parish church in the village which had been affected by the earthquake that shook much of La Rioja, especially Arnedillo on March 18, 1817.

Ausejo was part the province of Soria until the creation of the province of Logroño by royal decree of 30 November 1833.

== Demography ==
demographic vertical bar chart of between 1857 and 2010
Legal population (1857–1897) according to the population census published by the Instituto Nacional de Estadística in the 19th century.
Legal population (1900–1991) or Resident population (2001) according to the population census published by the Instituto Nacional de Estadística.
Population according to the municipal register of 2010 published by the Instituto Nacional de Estadística.

== Monuments ==
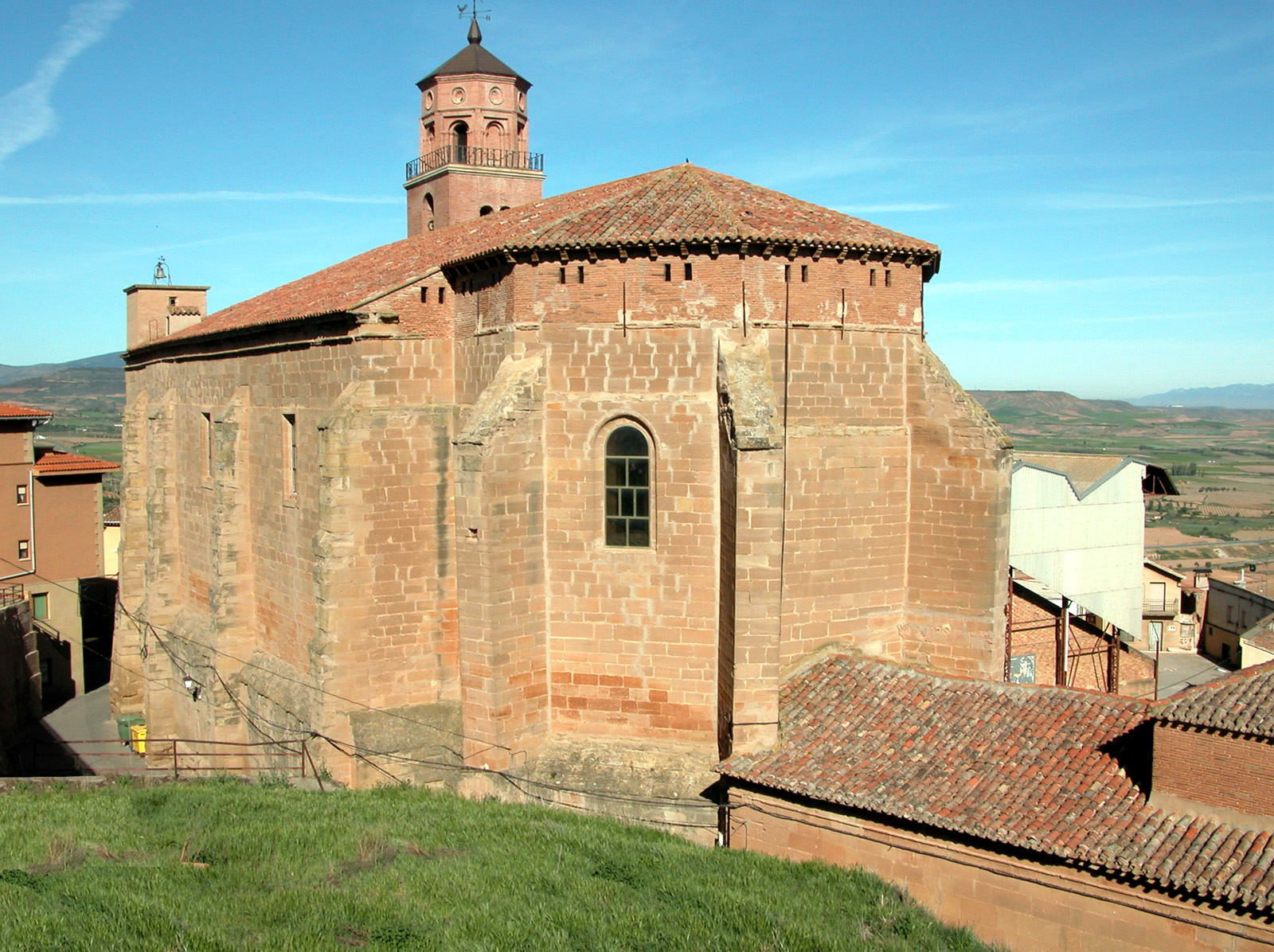
Santa María Church (16th–17th–18th centuries)

Santa Maria Parish Church: this is a masonry building with brick additions built in the second third of the 16th century and with façade and sanctuary from the 17th century. The top of the northern tower was built in the 18th century. The church was damaged by the 1817 earthquake and was rebuilt in 1840 with materials brought from the old castle.

Inside, there is abundant furniture art with 17th- and 18th-century baroque classical and Romanists works.

Santa María de la Antigua Hermitage: this is a 17th-century Baroque building located two kilometers from the town. It was constructed in stone and brick, with ashlar buttresses, but has been restored several times, presenting an elegant and attractive appearance. It has a nave with three tiers. Inside there is contemporary ceramic work and a 14th-century Gothic image of the proprietor, sitting, exquisitely repaired by local restaurateurs.

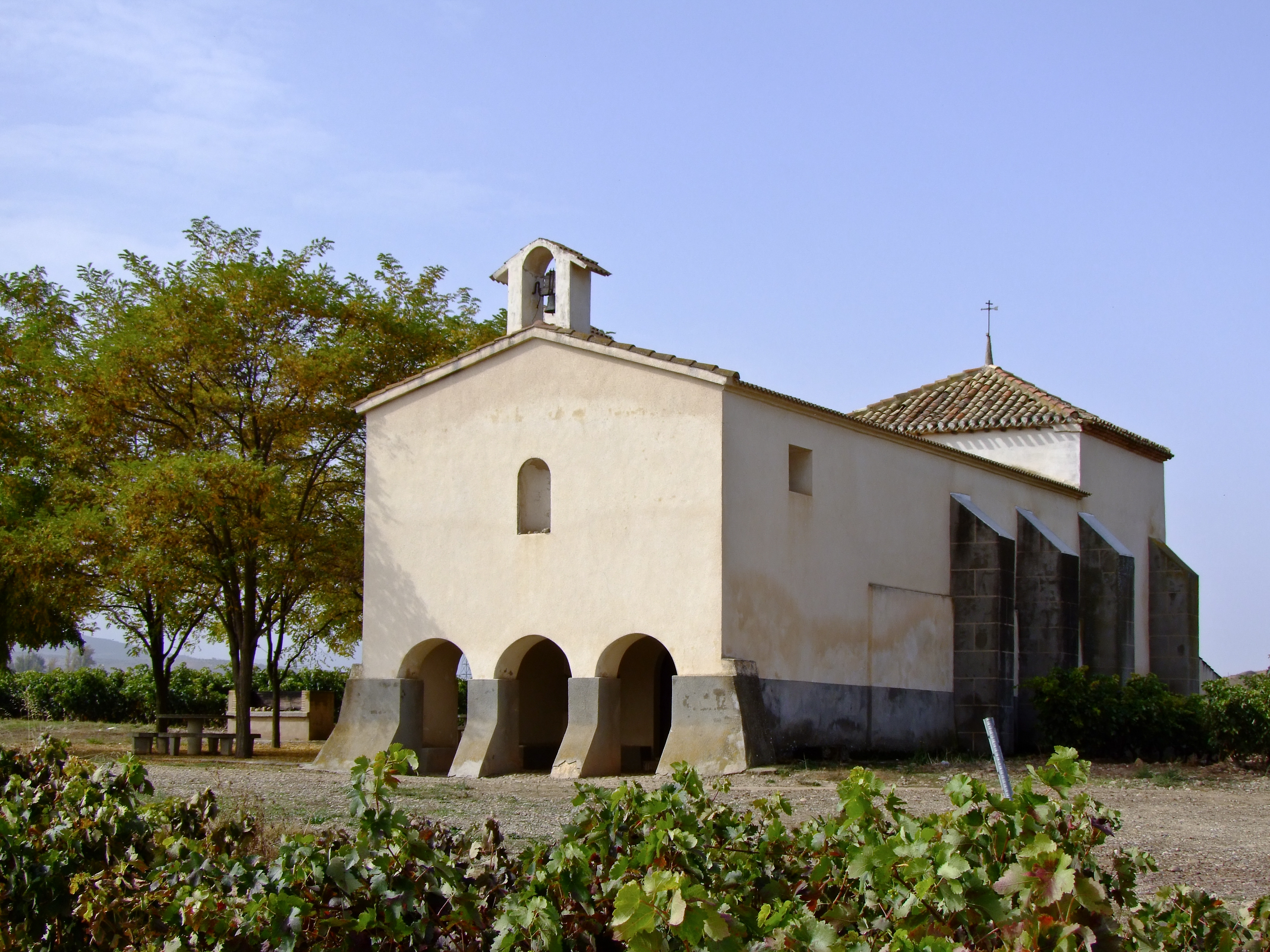
17th-century Santa María de la Antigua Hermitage

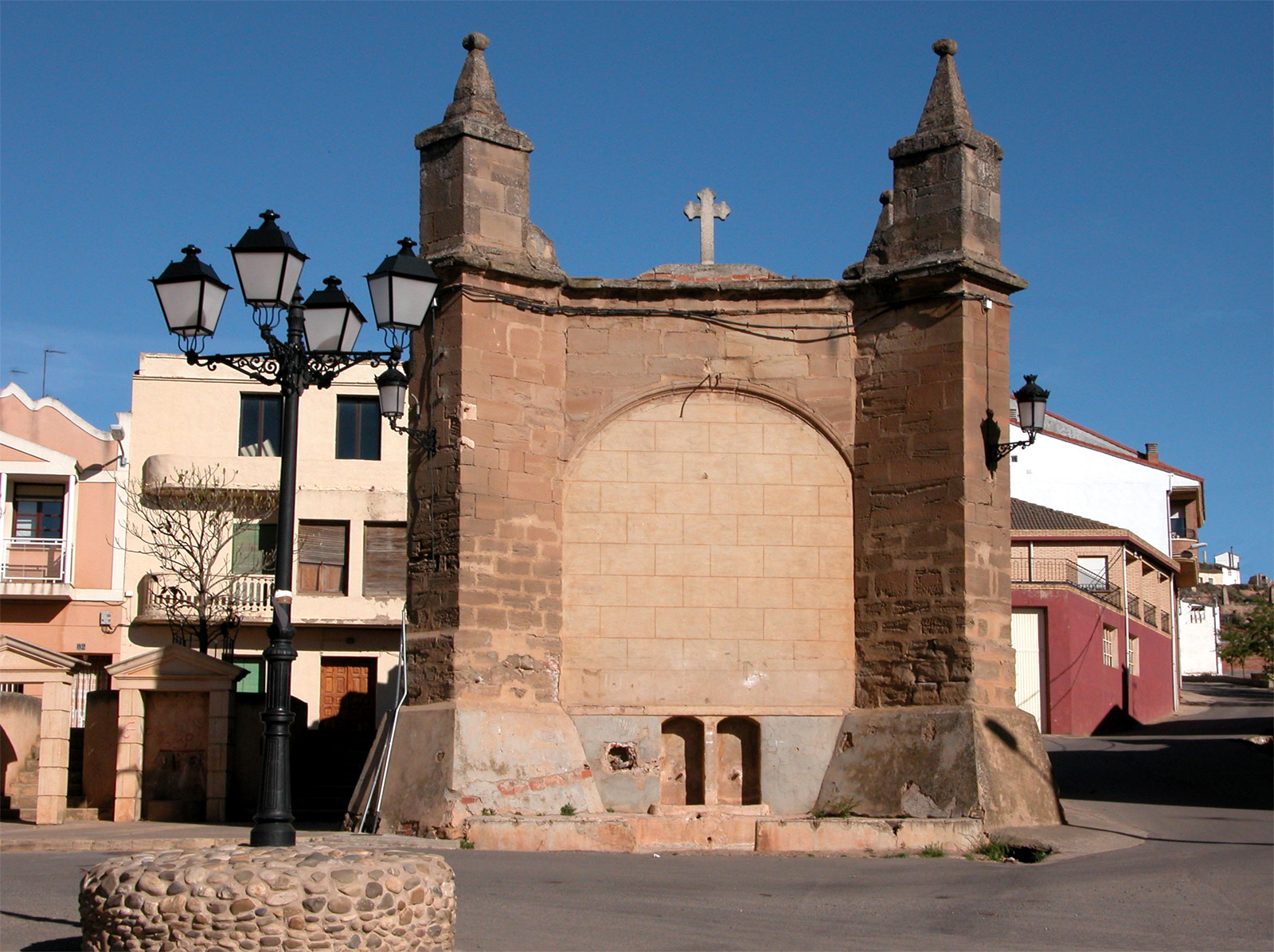
Chapel of the Crucifix (16th century)

Chapel of the Crucifix: this is an old 16th-century transept consisting of four brackets connected by semicircular arches that support a starred tracery vault. Its vain were later boarded up, except for one that still remains along with a nave that triples the original space.

The castle: located at the top of the hill unto which the town extends it has suffered such serious deterioration that one can only guess at the original structure. Two round turrets are observed to the east and southeast, and some of the walls to the south and north, suggest that these are the remains of different fortresses.

== Feasts ==
- On January 1 the quintos (boys who have reached the age of majority) make their rounds through the entire village, to raise money so that they can organize their food, dinner and verbena. The quintos usually celebrate on the Friday and Saturday of the first or second weekend of April.
- The pilgrimage to the Shrine of the Virgen de la Antigua and the blessing of the crops are done on May 3.
- The feast of San Isidro is celebrated on May 15.
- The feast of San Juan and traditional bonfires is celebrated in the district of Parramera on June 24.
- Following a referendum held in 1987, there was discussion about the possible change from the traditional date of the Ecce Homo festivities which were held on the third weekend of September. It was decided to move them from September to August in order to facilitate the participation of Ausejo natives who, having moved to other areas, return to their native homes during the holiday season.
- August 9 marks the day of the Virgen de la Antigua and on the 15th there is another pilgrimage to the shrine of the Virgen de la Antigua. The festivities usually last from the 8th to the 12th of August.
- The feast of San Miguel is celebrated on September 29.

== Famous persons ==
Prominent historical individuals from Ausejo include:

- Pedro de Merino, light cavalry soldier who captured the Montmonrency marshal at the Battle of Pavia in 1525
- Juan Gonzalez del Centeno, born in 1583, secretary to Philip IV
- Francisco del Merino, born in 1602 and notary of the Tribunal of the Holy Office
- Juan González de Tejada, inquisitor of Valencia in the 17th century
- Juan José Tejada, born in 1768, Bishop of Solsona and minister general of the Order of Mercy
- Antonio Paz Merino, counselor of Castile during the reign of Charles IV.

== Ausejo anthem ==
En el mapa de Rioja existe un pueblo no olvidaré. Ausejo de mi vida, que aunque estés lejos le vengo a ver, porque tengo a mis padres y de las cuevas nunca me olvido es la tierra querida donde he nacido.

¡Ay, ay, ay! Mi Ausejo que aunque me voy no te olvido me acuerdo de Las Caveras, y las viñas del Hornillo.

También de Valdarrete, Piezas del Monte y Viayón, tierras inolvidables donde he dejado el puro sudor, y hemos bajado la senda y hemos subido a Piezas del Monte, la fuente de la Madre que no se seque y mane abundante.

Onda Villa, Onda Villa y el pozo que no se seque, si del pozo no sale agua, la hortaliza se me muere.

En Ausejo estoy para disfrutar no te olvidaré jamás.

== See also ==
- La Rioja (Spain)
