= Hélie de Malemort =

Hélie on one of his seals

Hélie de Malemort (died 19 March 1207) was the archbishop of Bordeaux from 1188 until his death. During his episcopate, Bordeaux and the rest of the Duchy of Gascony lay within the Angevin Empire. He was a politically active bishop aligned with the Angevin ruling dynasty, especially after 1199.

== Early career ==
Hélie belonged to one of the leading noble families of the Limousin. Prior to his election as archbishop, he was the cantor of the cathedral of Limoges, in which capacity he attended on Henry the Young King at Martel during the latter's final illness.

Hélie was elected archbishop following the death in September 1187 of Archbishop William the Templar. Although the election was free of royal interference, there were accusations of simony. Pope Clement III placed Hélie under an interdict, prohibiting him from exercising his office until the accusations could be investigated. According to Roger of Howden, the accusation came from his own clergy and the matter was only dropped after Richard the Lionheart paid a large bribe to Cardinal Ottaviano di Paoli while travelling with the Third Crusade in 1190.

During the reign of Richard as duke of Aquitaine, Hélie did not attend Richard's court during its visits to Aquitaine. In 1197, he cooperated with Richard and the seneschal of Gascony in pronouncing the edict of peace prohibiting private warfare in the territory of Bordeaux. While Frédéric Boutoulle sees this as originating with Hélie based on the tradition of the Peace of God, Damien Carraz sees it as a royal initiative with little connection to local tradition.

In 1197–1198, Hélie clashed with Richard and his mother, the Duchess Eleanor of Aquitaine, over the episcopal election in Poitiers. Count Otto of Poitou prevented the archbishop from consecrating the newly elected bishop and so the latter went to Bourges seeking the assistance of Archbishop Henry de Sully, whom he thereby recognized as the primate of Aquitaine.

== Support for John Lackland ==
Following the death of Richard, Hélie was visited by the Duchess Eleanor on 1 July 1199 in Bordeaux and he travelled to Niort to visit the new duke, John Lackland, in November. In early 1200, he escorted John's niece, Blanche of Castile, from Bordeaux to the court of John in Normandy for her planned marriage to the French heir, Louis the Lion. On 13 May, he officiated their marriage at Port-Mort. He subsequently took part in the negotiation between John and Philip that resulted in the Treaty of Le Goulet on 18 May. With the other Gascon bishops, Hélie annulled the marriage of John to Isabella of Gloucester on grounds of consanguinity, which the bishops of England and Normandy had been unwilling to do. On 24 August 1200, Hélie officiated the marriage of John and Isabella of Angoulême in the cathedral of Angoulême.

On 28 July 1201, John charged Hélie with negotiating a resolution to the dispute over the dower of Richard the Lionheart's widow, Berengaria of Navarre. John rewarded Hélie for his services with grants and privileges more generously than any duke had treated an archbishop of Bordeaux since the early 11th century. The Duchess Eleanor confirmed these privileges. Hélie was present when John signed a treaty of alliance with Sancho VII of Navarre at Angoulême on 5 February 1202. With the new seneschal, Robert of Thurnham, he escorted Sancho back to Navarre. When war broke out between England and France in 1202, Hélie worked with the seneschal, Martin Algai, to prevent the rebellion in Poitou from spilling over into Gascony and to discourage Alfonso VIII of Castile from intervening on the side of France.

== Accusations of impropriety ==
Hélie depicted on his small round private seal

On 12 October 1203, Hélie visited John in Rouen and received a sweeping grant of rights and immunities. He remained with the court when John returned to England in December. Around that time, serious accusations against Hélie were brought before Pope Innocent III, who details them in a letter to the archbishop, dean and archdeacon of Bourges, dated 28 January 1204, ordering them to investigate. In addition to a renewed accusation of simony, Hélie was accused of permitting bands of routiers under Mercadier and a certain Arnaud to plunder the churches and people Gascony in return for a share of the booty, including the ransom of priests. This loot he was said to have hid in a castle controlled by his nephew. He was accused of having the abbey of Clairac plundered and its abbot seized and of occupying the abbey of Saint-Cybard for three days and using its cloisters and workshops to keep prostitutes and stable horses. He was accused of sexual liaisons with married women and of permitting illicit divorce (as in the case of John and Isabella).

The accusations against Hélie were bundled up with the Capetian–Plantagenet rivalry and the disputed primacy of Aquitaine between the sees of Bordeaux and Bourges. They probably originated with the clergy of Bourges. In the end, nothing came of them. The English chronicler Ralph of Coggeshall corroborates the accusation about the routiers, noting that it was Hélie's sending them into Gascony that aroused resentment against him. According to Innocent's letter, the mercenaries were employed in the name of enforcing the peace (presumably the peace of 1197).

== Final years ==
Hélie was at Reading on 19 January 1204 and at Winchester on 24 June. There is no evidence he ever returned to Bordeaux. He died on 19 March 1207, according to the necrology of the abbey of La Sauve-Majeure. The chronicler Bernard Itier places his death in 1206 in one place, but elsewhere places it in 1205 before the month of May (although he may have begun the year on 25 March). Hélie's absence from the record after 1204 suggests that he may have been in ill health for some time.

According to Ralph of Coggeshall, Hélie, while in England, requested 28,000 marks from John to raise an army of 30,000 troops for the defence of Gascony, to be recruited and led by Hélie's brother, Morève. The figures are exaggerated and Boutoulle doubts the essence of the story. Margaret Wade Labarge, on the other hand, sees Hélie's actions as directed against the coming invasion of Gascony by Alfonso VIII. A record from 1205 shows that the archbishop was compensated for expenses incurred in service to John.

== Sources ==
- Boutoulle, Frédéric (2004). "Hélie de Malemort, archevêque de Bordeaux: un prélat politique au service de Jean sans Terre (1199–1207)". Revue historique de Bordeaux et du département de la Gironde (4): 7–23.
- Carraz, Damien (2013). "Un revival de la paix de Dieu? Les paix diocésaines du XII^{e} siècle dans le Midi". Cahiers de Fanjeaux. 48: 523–558.
- Lewis, Andrew W., ed. (2012). The Chronicle and Historical Notes of Bernard Itier. Clarendon Press.
- Labarge, Margaret Wade (1980). Gascony, England's First Colony, 1204–1453. Hamish Hamilton.
- Lodge, Eleanor Constance (1971). Gascony Under English Rule. Kennikat Press.
- Turner, Ralph V.; Heiser, Richard R. (2000). The Reign of Richard Lionheart: Ruler of The Angevin Empire, 1189–1199. Pearson.
