= Charles de Lorraine, Count of Armagnac =

Charles
- Count of Armagnac
- Born: 22 February 1684
- Died: 29 December 1751 (aged 67); Paris, France
- Burial: Couvent des Capucines, Paris
- Spouse: Françoise Adélaide de Noailles
Names
- Charles de Lorraine
- House: Lorraine
- Father: Louis de Lorraine
- Mother: Catherine de Neufville

Charles de Lorraine (22 February 1684 – 29 December 1751) was a member of the House of Guise, a cadet branch of the House of Lorraine. Succeeding his father as the Count of Armagnac, he also succeeded as Count of Brionne as well as the Grand Squire of France.

== Biography ==
Born to Louis de Lorraine, Count d'Armagnac and his wife Catherine de Neufville-Villeroy (1639-1707) in 1684, Charles de Lorraine was the couple's last child.

Charles' father, Louis, was the Grand Squire of France, one of the Great Officers of the Crown of France and a member of the king's household. The position was roughly equivalent to the United Kingdom positions of Master of the Horse and the Crown Equerry. This entitled his father to be addressed as Monsieur le Grand, a style which Charles would later use after succeeding his father in his posts. At Charles' death, it was given to Louis' grandson, Louis, Prince of Lambesc.

Charles' mother was Catherine de Neufville, youngest child of Nicolas de Neufville, Maréchal de Villeroy, governor of the young Louis XIV. Charles' uncle was the next Duke of Villeroy and the future governor of Louis XV.

Charles' sister, Marie, was the mother of Louise Hippolyte Grimaldi, the only Princess of Monaco to reign in her own right. His older brother, Henri, Count of Brionne, was expected to succeed to the Armagnac titles but died in 1713, five years before his father.

On 22 May 1717 during the Regency of Philippe II d'Orléans (1715–1723), Charles married Françoise Adélaide de Noailles, the eldest daughter of Adrien Maurice de Noailles, Duke de Noailles, and his wife Françoise Charlotte d'Aubigné, the niece and heiress of Madame de Maintenon. The couple had no issue, and divorced in 1721.

Charles de Lorraine died in Paris in 1745 at 67 years old. He was buried at the Couvent des Capucines in Paris. With his death, the County of Armagnac reverted to the French crown, which had given it away to the Guise-Lorraine family in 1645.

== Ancestry ==
Ancestors of Charles de Lorraine, Count of Armagnac

16. René de Lorraine, Marquis d'Elbeuf
8. Charles de Lorraine, Duke d'Elbeuf
17. Louise de Rieux
4. Henri de Lorraine, Count d'Harcourt
18. Léonor Chabot, Count de Charny
9. Marguerite de Chabot
19. Françoise de Longwy-Rye
2. Louis de Lorraine, Count d'Armagnac
20. François du Cambout, seigneur de Cambout
10. Charles du Cambout, Marquis de Coislin
21. Louise du Plessis de Richelieu
5. Marguerite Philippe du Cambout
22. Charles de Beurges, seigneur de Seury
11. Philippe de Beurges
23. Jeanne Lescoët, dame de Mogulaye
1. Charles de Lorraine
24. Nicolas IV de Neufville, seigneur de Villeroy
12. Charles de Neufville, Marquis de Villeroy
25. Madeleine de L'Aubespine
6. Nicolas de Neufville, Duke de Villeroy
26. Nicolas de Harlay, Baron de Maule
13. Jacqueline de Harlay de Sancy
27. Marie Moreau, dame de Grosbois
3. Catherine de Neufville
28. Antoine de Blanchefort de Créquy, seigneur de Saint-Janvrin
14. Charles de Blanchefort, Duke de Créquy, Prince de Poix
29. Chrétienne d'Aguerre
7. Marie de Créquy, dame de Mions
30. François de Bonne, 1st Duke de Lesdiguières
15. Madeleine de Bonne de Lesdiguières
31. Claudine de Berenger
