= François de Troy =

French painter (1645–1730)

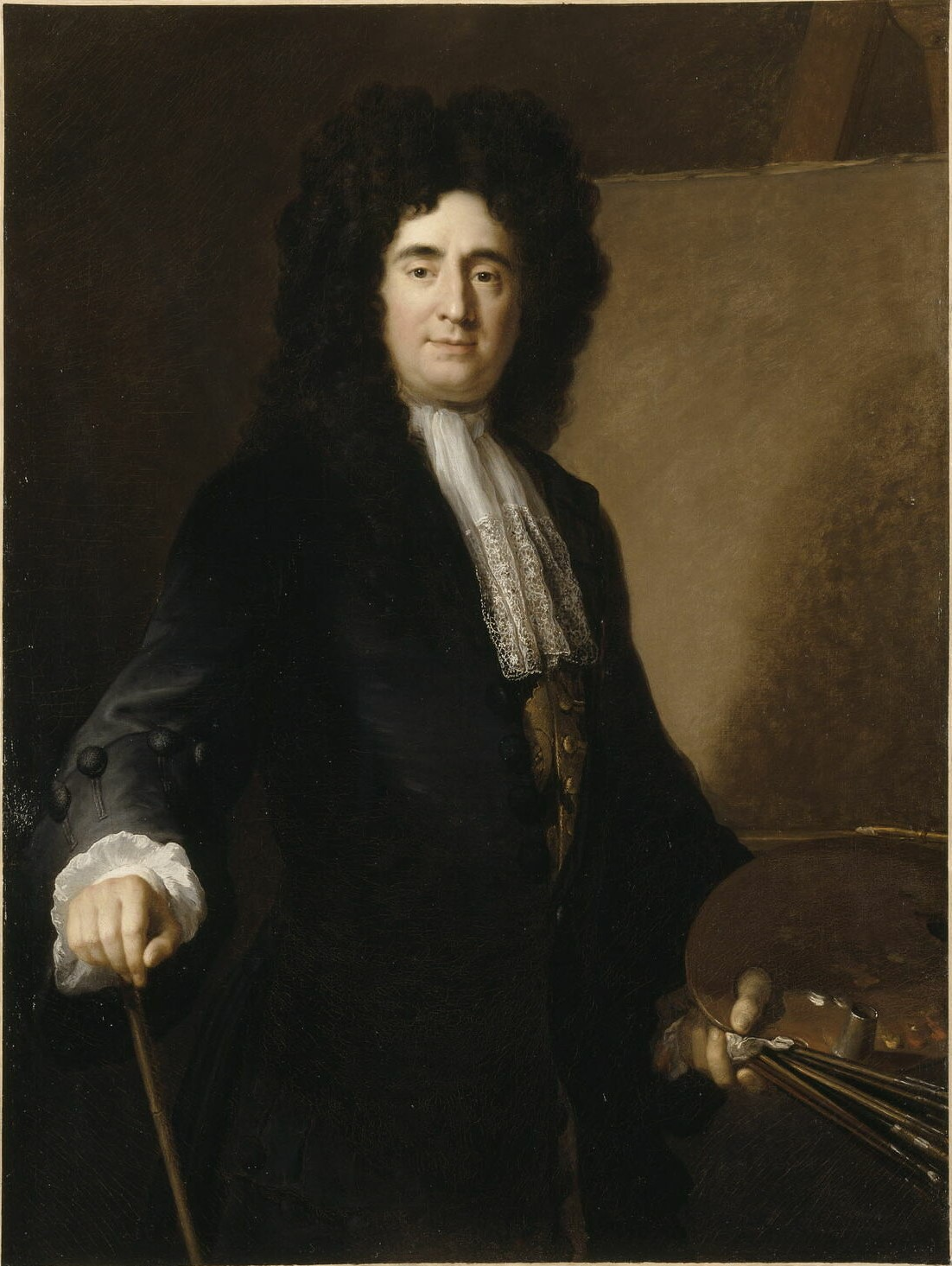
- Portrait of Troy from 1703 by his student and Academy member Alexis Simon Belle
- Born: 9 January 1645; Toulouse, Languedoc, France
- Died: 1 May 1730 (aged 85); Paris, France
- Known for: Painting
- Children: Jean-François de Troy
- Patrons: Courts of James II of England and James Francis Edward Stuart in exile, French court

Director of the Académie de Peinture et de Sculpture
- In office 1708–1711
- Monarch: Louis XIV
- Preceded by: Jean Jouvenet
- Succeeded by: Corneille Van Clève

François de Troy (9 January 1645 – 1 May 1730) was a French painter and engraver who became principal painter to King James II in exile at Saint-Germain-en-Laye and Director of the Académie Royale de peinture et de sculpture.

== Early life ==
One of a family of artists, Troy was born in Toulouse, the son of Antoine Troy (bapt. 28 July 1608 – 15 September 1684), a painter in that city, and Astrugue Bordes. François Troy and was the brother of the painter Jean de Troy (4 April 1638 – 25 June 1691). Troy was taught the basic skills of painting by his father, and perhaps also by the more worldly Antoine Durand.

François de Troy is not to be confused with his son, the portrait painter Jean-François de Troy (1679–1752), who studied under him.

== Career ==
At some time after 1662, Troy went to Paris to study portrait painting under Claude Lefèbvre (1633–1675) and Nicolas-Pierre Loir (1624–1679]. A. P. F. Robert-Dumesnil states that this occurred when Troy was aged twenty-four.

In 1669, Troy married his master Nicolas-Pierre Loir's sister-in-law, Jeanne Cotelle.

In 1671, he was approved (agréé) by the Académie Royale de peinture et de sculpture. In 1674, he was received into the Academy as a history painter, with a reception piece (morceau de réception) entitled Mercure coupant la tête d'Argus ('Mercury cutting off the head of Argus').

Troy's early known works include tapestry designs for Madame de Montespan, one of the many mistresses of Louis XIV, and paintings with religious and mythological subjects.

In the 1670s, he became friendly with Roger de Piles, who introduced him to Dutch and Flemish painting, and after the death of Claude Lefebvre in 1675, Troy changed his direction to become a portrait artist, aiming at commissions from Lefebvre's former clients. In 1679 he was commissioned to paint a portrait of the Swedish ambassador Nils Bielke, and in 1680 that of Maria Anna Victoria of Bavaria, shortly after her marriage to Louis, Grand Dauphin, the heir to the French throne, on 7 March 1680. Troy became a successful painter of fashionable single and group portraits. His clients included Madame de Montespan, her son by the king, Louis Auguste, Duke of Maine, and his wife Louise Bénédicte de Bourbon.

As a result of such commissions, Troy was able to work continuously in court circles for almost fifty years. He was admired for his ability to capture the upper classes and their preoccupation with manners and fashion. Perhaps more importantly, he was said to have the ability to make any woman look beautiful, which made him sought after by all women.

In the 1690s, Troy became the principal painter to the court of King James II in exile at Saint-Germain-en-Laye, where he was the master of Alexis Simon Belle.

By the years 1698 to 1701, a period of peace between France and Great Britain, Jacobites could cross the English Channel carrying portraits of James Francis Edward Stuart and his sister Princess Louisa Maria. Troy was then James II's only court painter and needed the help of Belle, his best student, to produce the many portraits commissioned from him.

In 1698, he was appointed a Professor of the Académie Royale, and in 1708 became its director.

Troy was an engraver as well as a painter. Among his engravings is one of the funeral in 1683 of Maria Theresa of Austria, the wife of King Louis XIV.

Apart from his son, Jean-François, Troy's other students included André Bouys and John Closterman.

He died in Paris at the age of eighty-five.

== Work ==
The portraits painted by Troy include (see image gallery) -

- Richard Talbot, 1st Earl of Tyrconnell, 1690
- Lady Mary Herbert, Viscountess Montagu, as Diana, c. 1692
- Jean de la Fontaine
- Jules Hardouin-Mansart (1646–1708)
- Élisabeth Jacquet de La Guerre (1665–1729)
- Princess Louisa Maria Stuart (1692–1712), about 1705
- Portrait d'un couple en Vénus et Pâris, 1691, 150 cm by 120 cm, now in the Louvre

== Gallery ==
Paintings by François de Troy

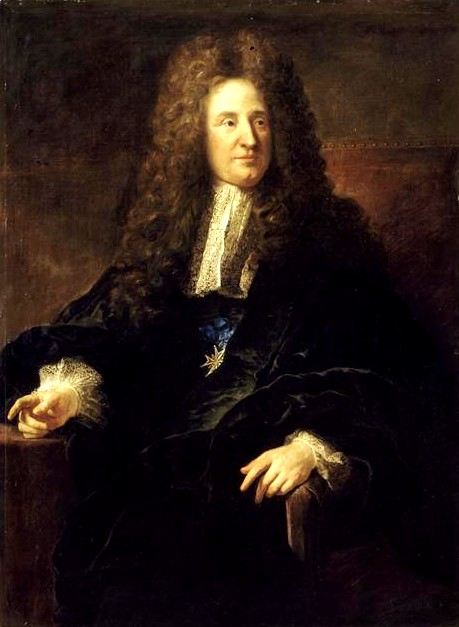
Jules Hardouin Mansart

Princess Louisa Maria Stuart, about 1705

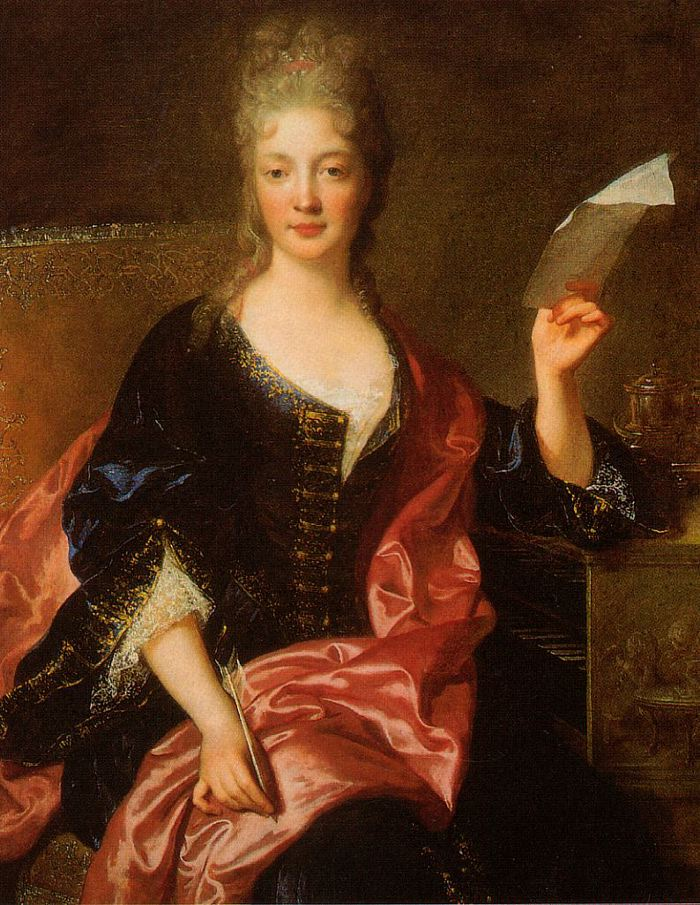
Élisabeth Jacquet de La Guerre

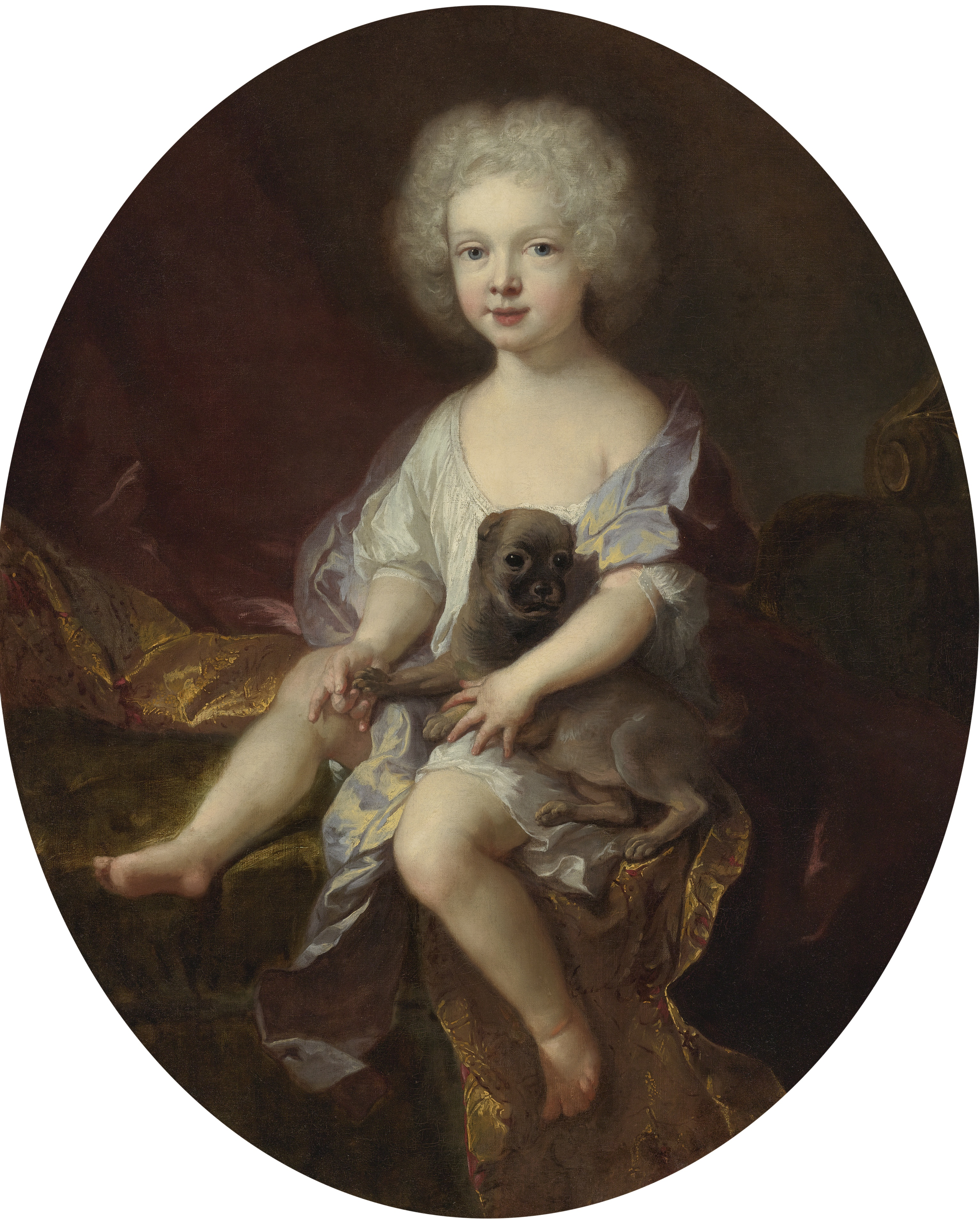
Portrait of a young boy with a dog

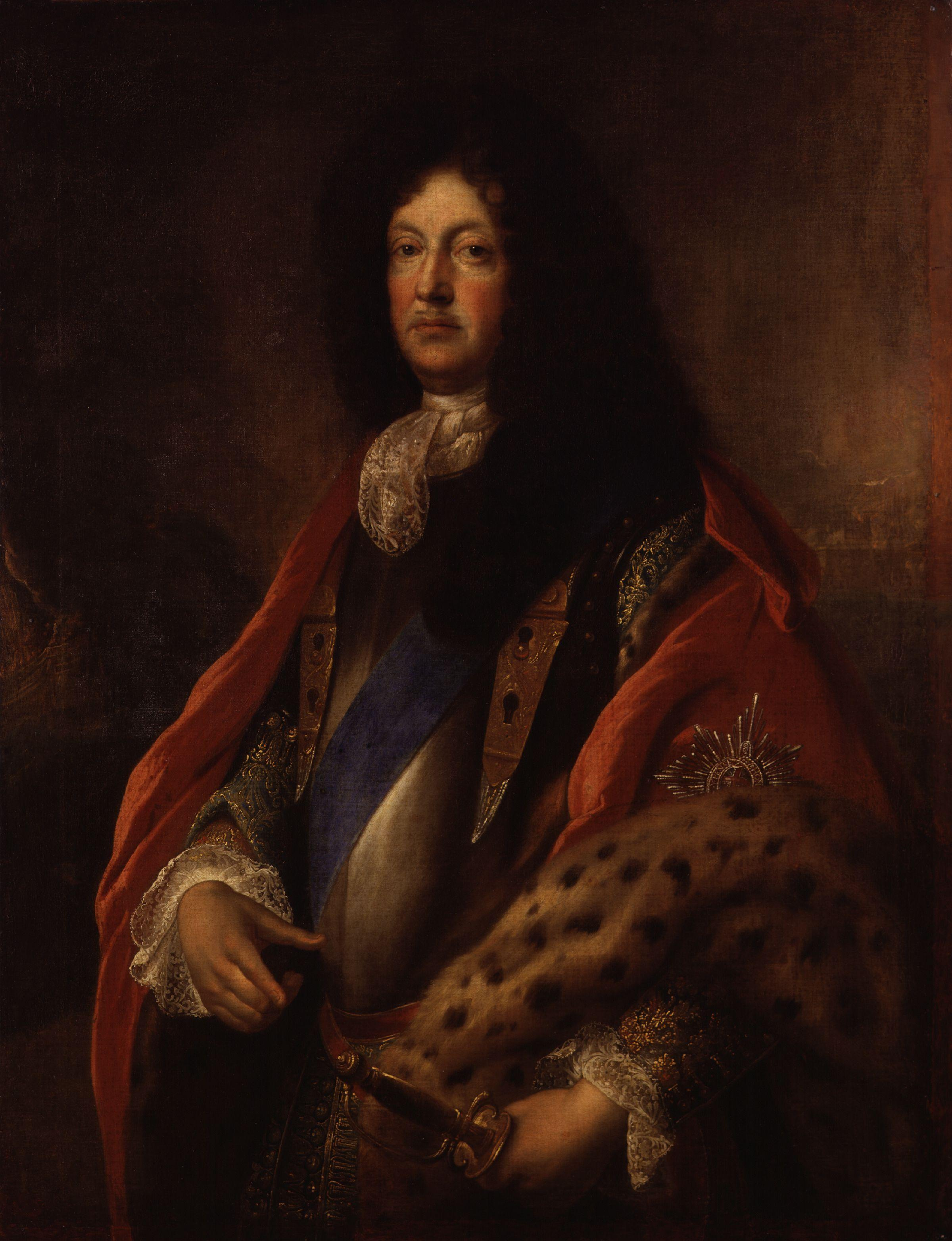
Richard Talbot, 1st Earl of Tyrconnell

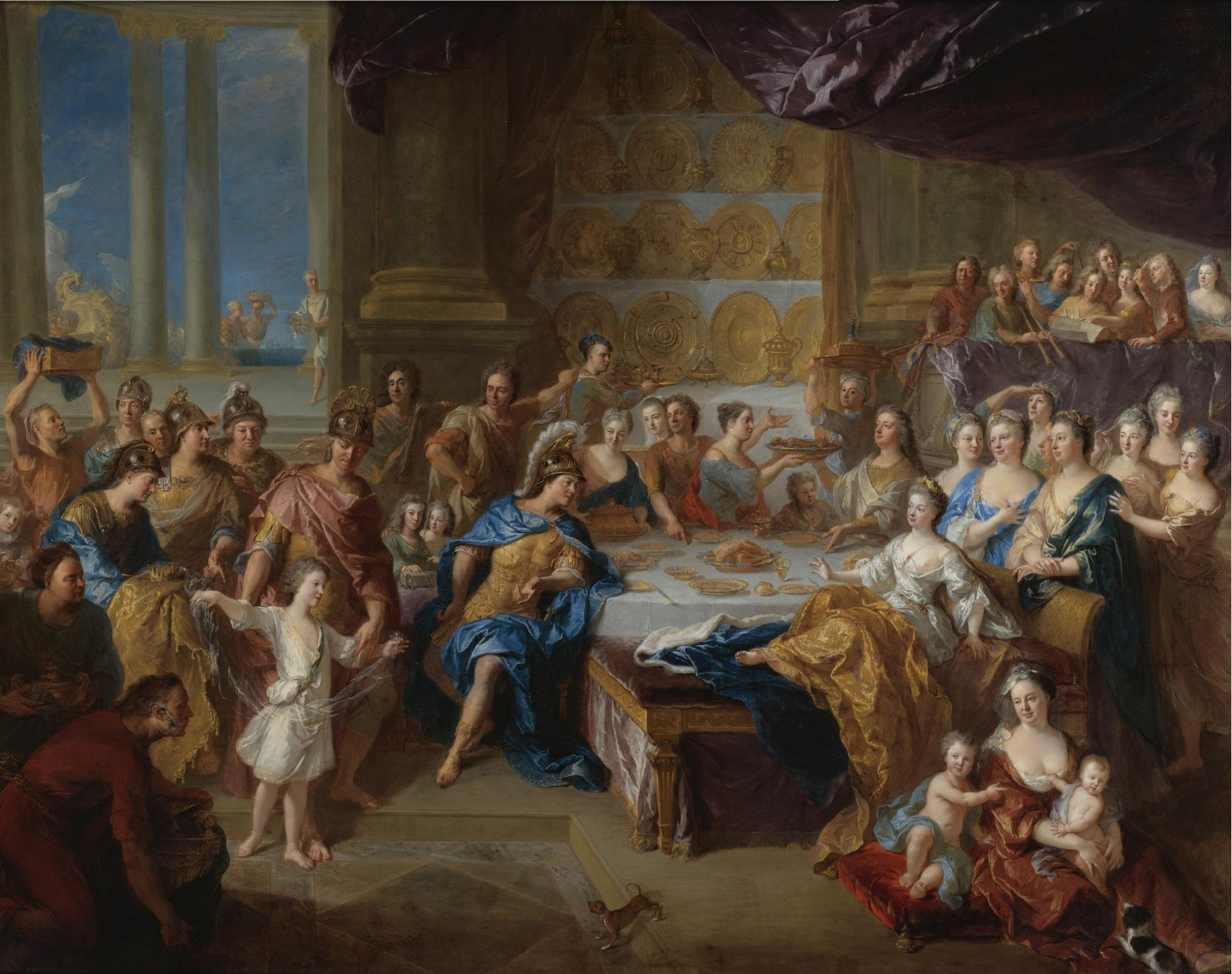
The Feast of Dido and Aeneas, 1704

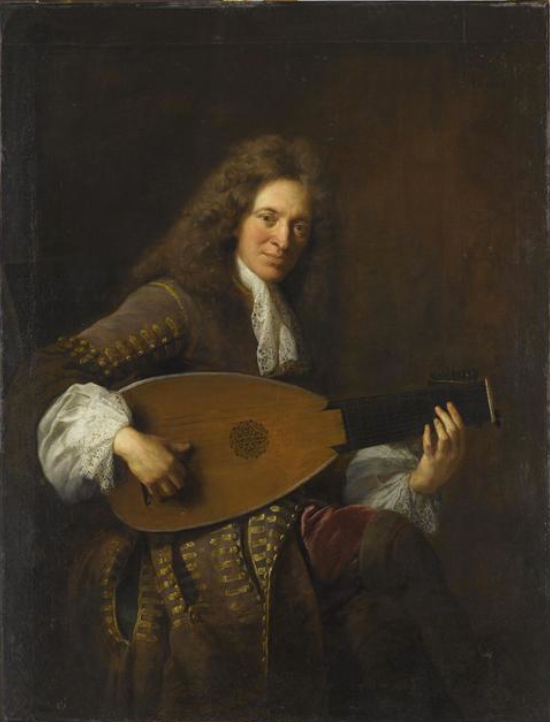
Charles Mouton, 1690

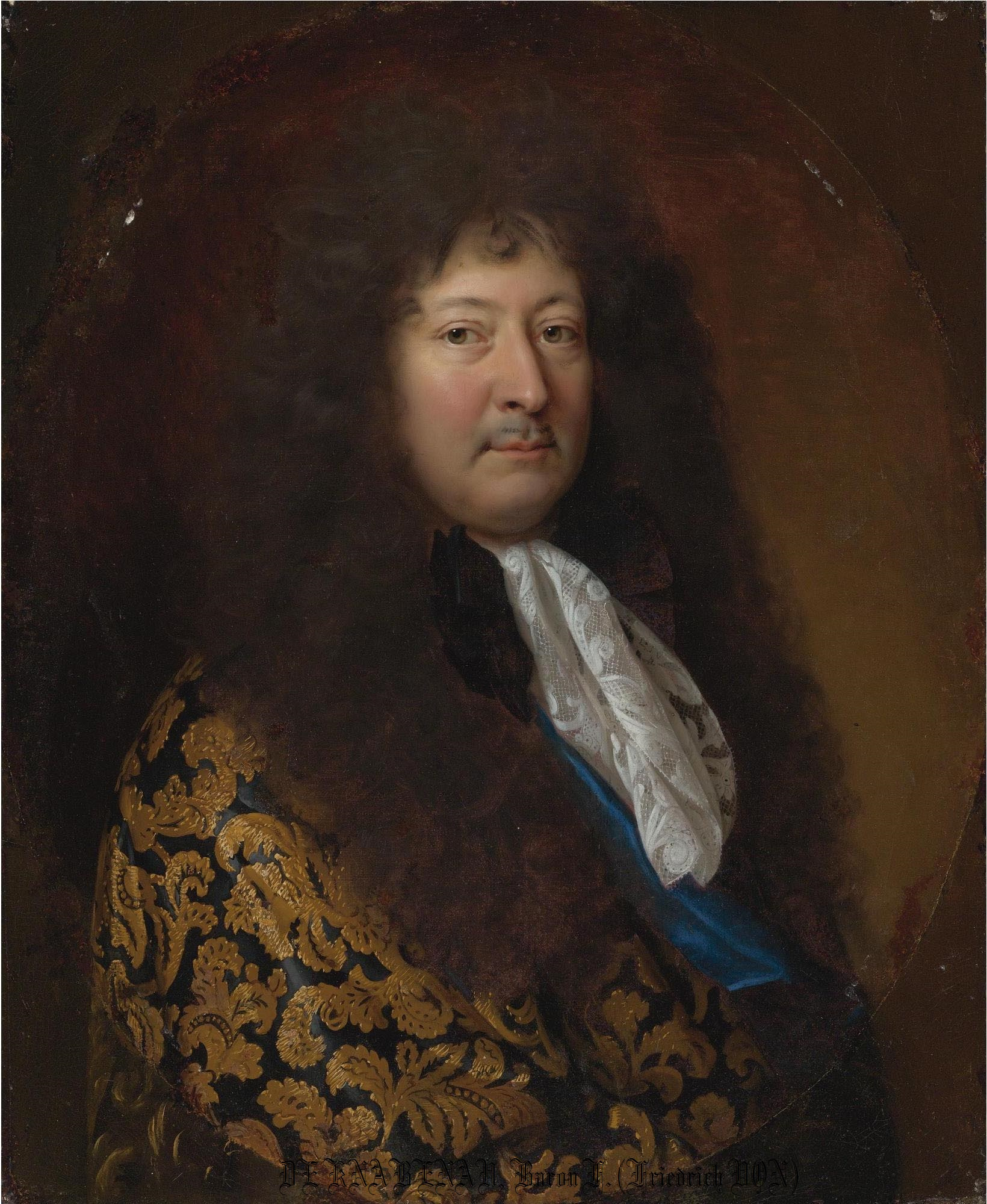
Friedrich Baron de Knabenau,1670

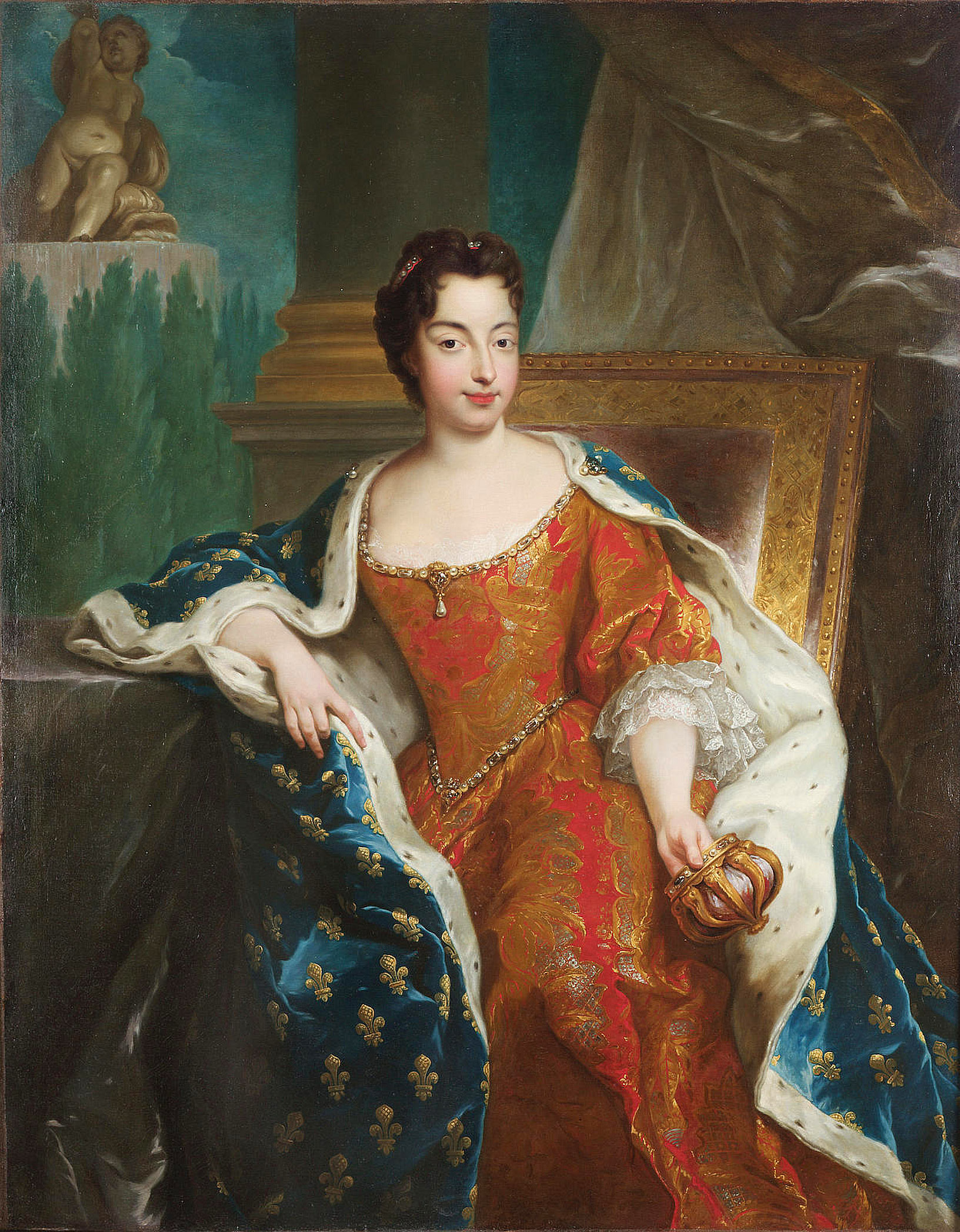
The Dauphine of France, after 1690

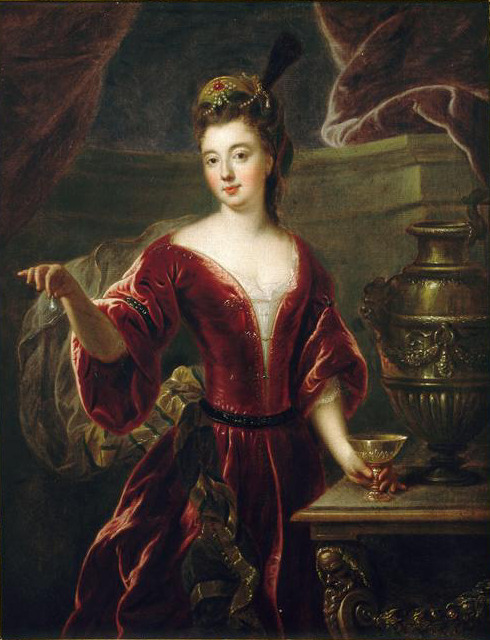
The Duchess of Bourbon as Cleopatra

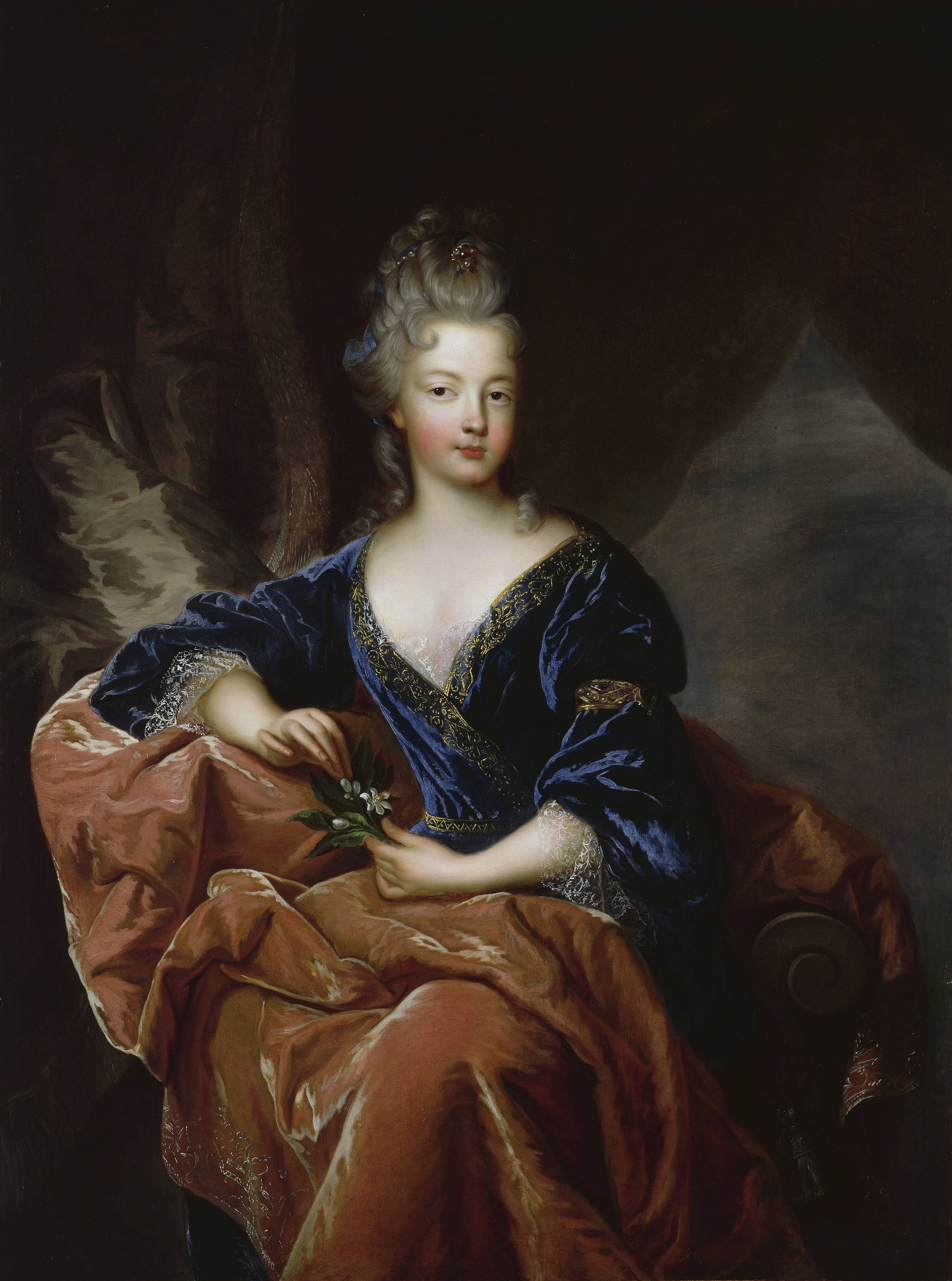
The Duchess of Orléans.

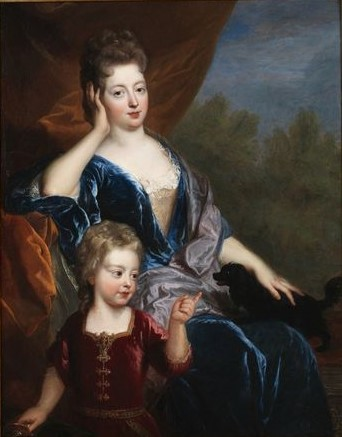
The Count of Brionne's wife, Marie Madeleine d'Epinay and son the Prince of Lambesc, 1697

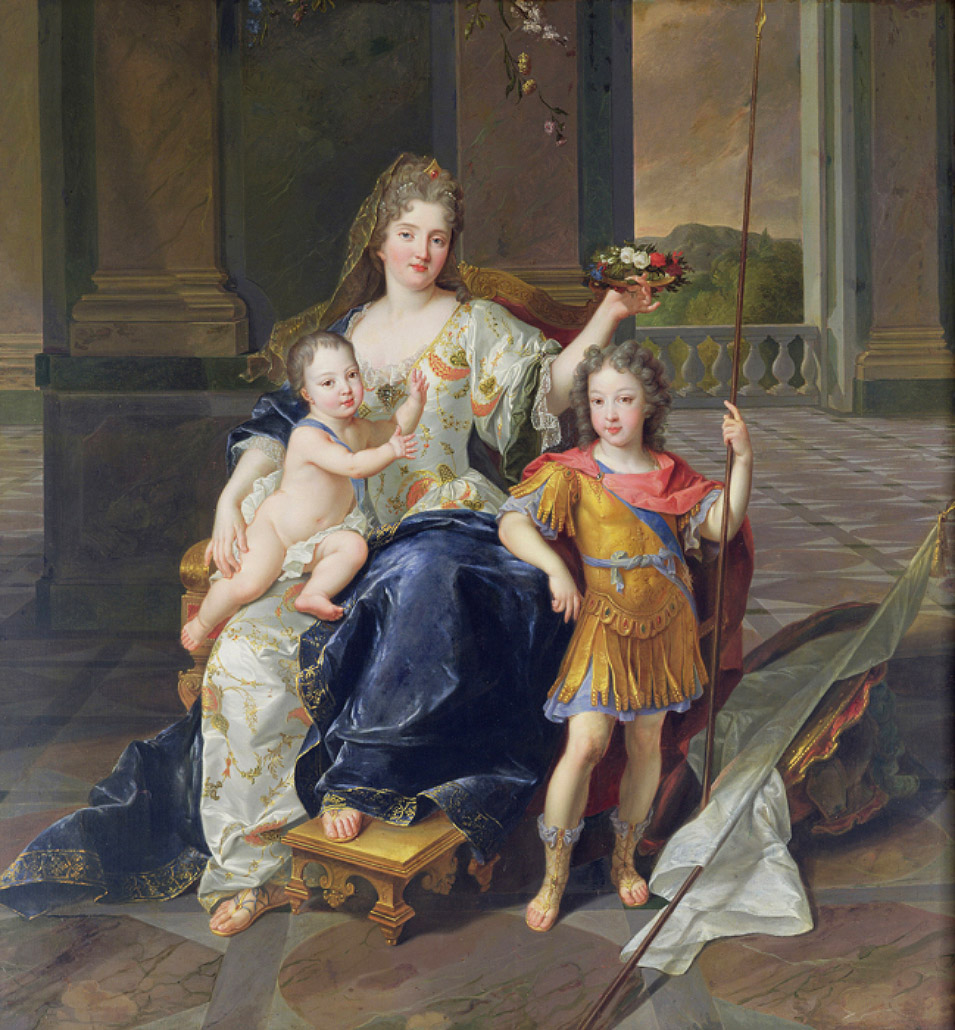
The Duchess of La Ferté-Senneterre with the Duke of Anjou on her lap and the Duke of Brittany, 1710

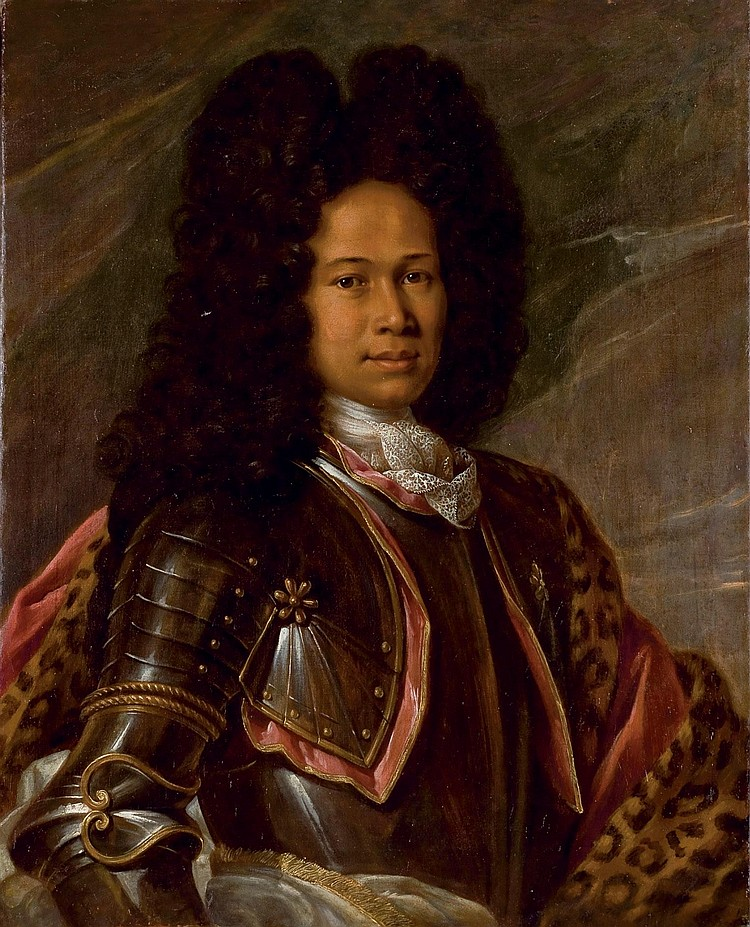
Portrait of a mulatto in armour, c.1680-1730

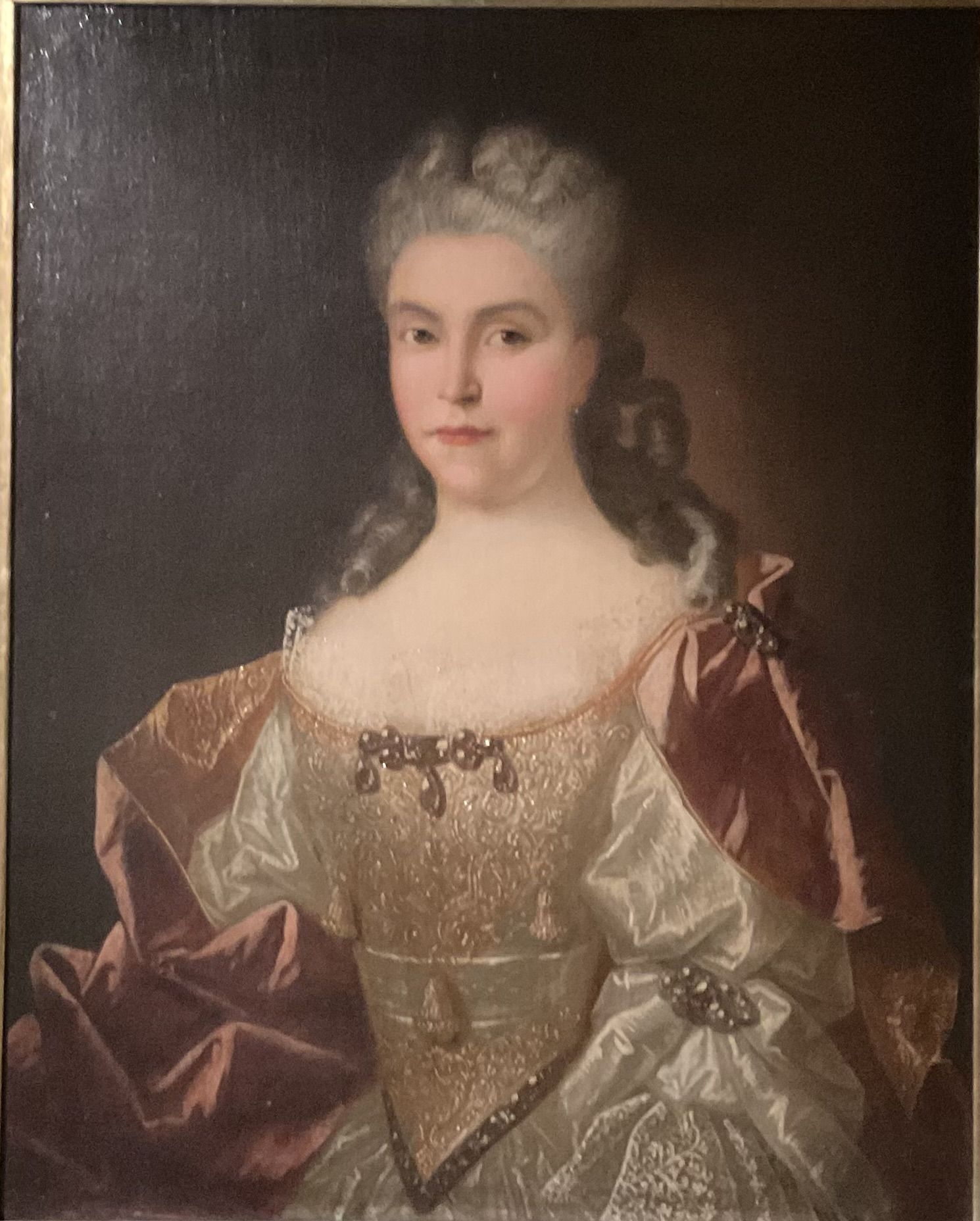
French Noblewoman Louise Françoise de Bourbon completed in 1690
