= Roger I of Fézensaguet =

Roger I Armagnac (1190 – 22 March 1245) was Viscount of Fezensaguet. He was the son of Bernard I, Viscount of Fezensaguet and Lomagne, and Geralda de Foix.

== Biography ==
Roger I of Fezensaguet married Pincelle, the Maid of Albret, daughter of Amanieu IV, Lord of Albret, and Asselide Tartas.
Their children were:

- Gerald VI (1235 † 1285), Viscount Fezensaguet, then Count of Armagnac and Fézensac.
- Roger, founder of the branch of the lords and barons of Termes d'Armagnac.
- Arnaud Bernard († 1272), killed in a battle against Gerald Cazaubon.
- Jeanne, married to 1240/42 with Raymond Sancho Manas.
