= Grand Squire of France =

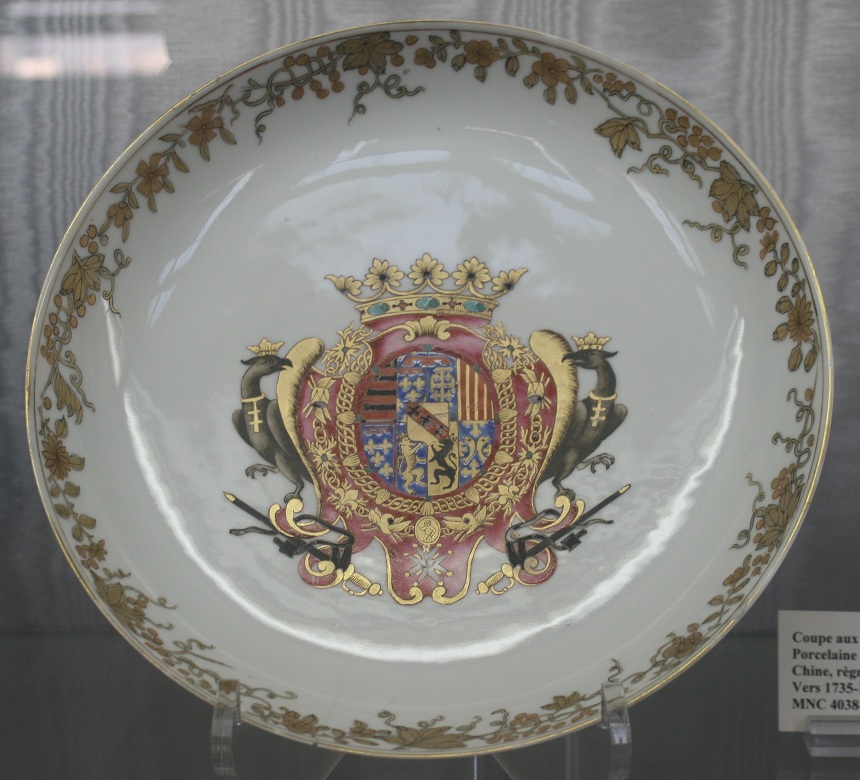
Plate (1735) with arms of Charles de Lorraine, Count of Armagnac as Grand Squire of France; the swords in scabbards wrapped in baldrics (belts), visible in the compartment (bottom area), mark his office of Grand Écuyer.

The Grand Squire of France (French: Grand écuyer de France, also called 'Grand Equerry' or 'Grand Écuyer') was one of the Great Officers of the Crown of France and a member of the Maison du Roi ("King's Household") during the Ancien Régime. The name "écuyer", the French word for squire, is the origin for the French word "écurie" (stable) and the English word equerry. The position was roughly equivalent to the United Kingdom positions of Master of the Horse and the Crown Equerry.

The position of Grand Écuyer was made an Officer of the Crown by Henri III for the benefit of his favorite Roger de Saint-Lary de Bellegarde.

The Grand Écuyer was commonly referred to as "Monsieur le Grand". He was in charge of the royal stables, the transport of the king and his ceremonial entourage (heralds, men of arms, musicians, etc.). As well as the superintendence of the royal stables, he had that of the retinue of the sovereign, also the charge of the funds set aside for the religious functions of the court, coronations, etc. On the death of a sovereign he had the right to all the horses and their equipment in the royal stables. He oversaw personally the "Great Stable" ("grande écurie"). The authority of the Grand Écuyer also extended across the realm, as he oversaw horse breeding and provincial military academies created to educate young nobles.

Distinct from this officer and independent of him, was the first equerry ("Premier Écuyer de France"), who had charge of the horses which the sovereign used personally (the "Little Stable" or "petite écurie"), and who attended on him when he rode out.

The office of Grand Squire existed down to the reign of Louis XVI. Under Louis XVIII and Charles X the duties were discharged by the first equerry, but under Napoleon I and Napoleon III the office was revived with much of its old importance.

The Grand Écuyer had the privilege of bearing the king's sword in ceremonies outside of royal residences.

From 1643 to the French Revolution, the Grand Écuyer was chosen from the house of Lorraine.

== List of Grands Écuyers of France ==
Arms of Louis Charles de Lorraine, Count of Brionne as Grand Squire of France; he has as supporters swords in scabbards wrapped in baldrics, all covered in fleurs-de-lys.

- 1470-1483: Alain Goyon, seigneur de Villiers, de Thieuville, du Mesnilgarnier
- 1483-1505: Pierre II d'Urfé (v.1430-1508), seigneur d'Urfé
- 1505-1525: Galeazzo Sanseverino, comte de Caiazzo
- 1526–1546: Jacques de Genouillac (Galiot de Genouillac), Seigneur of Assier
- 1546-1570: Claude Gouffier, duc de Roannais
- 1570-1597: Léonor Chabot, comte de Charny et de Buzançais
- 1597-1605: Charles I, Duke of Elbeuf
- 1605–1611: Roger de Saint-Lary, Duke of Bellegarde, 1st term
- 1611–1621: César-Auguste de Saint-Lary, Baron of Termes
- 1621–1639: Roger de Saint-Lary, Duke of Bellegarde, 2nd term
- 1639–1642: Henri de Coëffier de Ruzé d'Effiat, Marquis of Cinq-Mars
- 1642–1658: Henri de Lorraine, Count of Harcourt
- 1666–1677: Louis de Lorraine, Count of Armagnac
- 1677–1718: Henri de Lorraine, Count of Brionne
- 1718–1752: Charles de Lorraine, Count of Armagnac ("le prince Charles")
- 1752–1761: Louis Charles de Lorraine, Count of Brionne
- 1761–1790: Charles Eugène de Lorraine, Prince of Lambesc

== Grand écuyer de l'Empereur ==
Under the First French Empire, the title was bestowed on Armand-Augustin-Louis de Caulaincourt in June 1804.

== See also ==
- Great Officers of the Crown of France
- Maison du Roi
- Master of the Horse
- Equerry
