= Henri, Count of Brionne =

Henri
- Count of Brionne
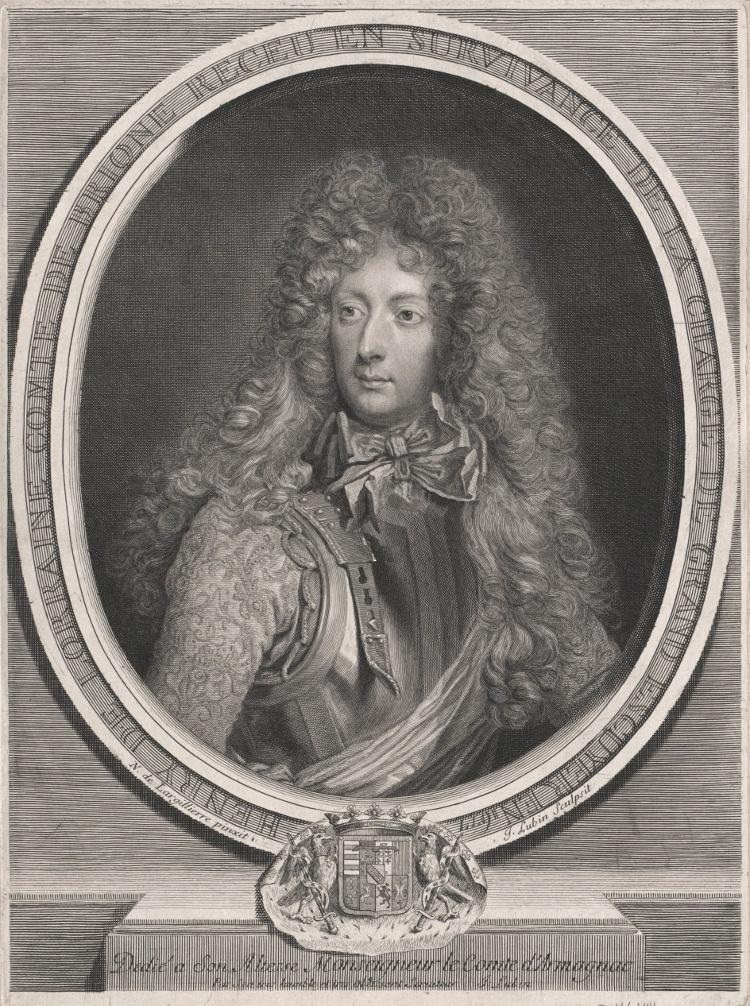
- Anonymous engraving of Brionne
- Born: 15 November 1661
- Died: 3 April 1713 (aged 51); Versailles, France
- Spouse: Marie Madeline d'Epinay
- Issue Detail: Louis, Prince of Lambesc; Mademoiselle de Brionne
Names
- Henri de Lorraine
- House: Lorraine
- Father: Louis de Lorraine, Count of Armagnac
- Mother: Catherine de Neufville

Henri de Lorraine (15 November 1661 – 3 April 1713) was the Count de Brionne. He was a member of a cadet branch of the House of Guise and the Grand Squire of France.

== Biography ==
Born to Louis de Lorraine, Count of Armagnac, and his wife Catherine de Neufville-Villeroy (1639-1707), he was the couple's first child.

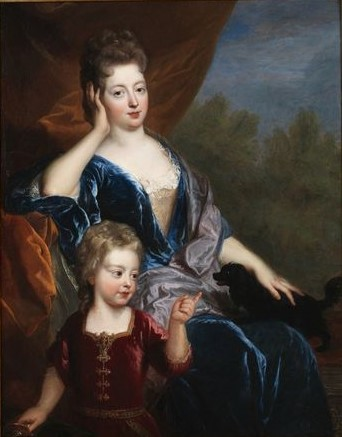
Henri's wife with their son Louis, 1697, François de Troy.

His father Louis, was the Grand Squire of France, one of the Great Officers of the Crown of France. The position was roughly equivalent to the United Kingdom positions of Master of the Horse and the Crown Equerry.

At Louis' death, the post, as well as style of Monsieur le Grand was taken by Henri's youngest brother, Charles of Lorraine, Count of Armagnac (at Charles' death, it was given to Henri's son, the Prince of Lambesc).

Henri's mother was Catherine de Neufville, youngest child of the Maréchal de Villeroy, governor of the young Louis XIV. Henri's first cousin was François de Neufville, Duke de Villeroy and the future governor of Louis XV.

On 23 December 1689, Henri married Marie Madeleine d'Éspinay and had two children, the future Prince of Lambesc and a daughter styled Mademoiselle de Brionne. Only the former married. His great-granddaughter Joséphine of Lorraine, "Princess of Carignan" was the grand mother of King Charles Albert of Sardinia thus an ancestor of the present House of Savoy and thus the pretender to the modern Italian throne.

In 1696, Henri escorted Marie Adelaide of Savoy from the frontier to her wedding with Louis, Duke of Burgundy.

Henri died in 1713, five years before his father and thus the countship of Armagnac was given to his youngest brother, Charles. Henri died at Versailles, his wife outliving him by over a year.

Henri had an illegitimate child by an unknown mistress, Mademoiselle Pothenot; the child was called bâtard de Brionne and styled as "le Chevalier d'Orgon".

== Issue ==
1. Louis de Lorraine, Prince de Lambesc (13 February 1692 – 9 September 1743) married Jeanne de Durfort (grand daughter of Jacques de Durfort
2. Marie Louise of Lorraine, Mademoiselle de Brionne (24 October 1693 – 18 October 1724) died unmarried.

== Sources ==
- Gibiat, Samuel (2006). Hiérarchies sociales et ennoblissement: les commissaires des guerres de la Maison du roi au XVIII siecle (in French). Ecole des Chartes.
- Spangler, Jonathan (2009). The Society of Princes: The Lorraine-Guise and the Conservation of Power and Wealth in Seventeenth-Century France. Ashgate Publishing Limited.
