= Gerald I of Armagnac =

Gerald I Trancaleon (also spelled Guiraut or, in French, Géraud Trancaléon or Tranche-Lion) (died 1020) was the Count of Armagnac from 995 until his death. He was the son and successor of Bernard I.

Gerald married Adalais, daughter of William Sánchez of Gascony and Urraca Garcés. They had two children:

- Galdis, who inherited the viscounty of Corneilhas and married Adhemar of Polestron
- Bernard, who succeeded him in Armagnac.

== Sources ==
- Leroy, Béatrice; Barraqué, Jean Pierre (2002). De l'Aquitaine à l'Ebre les liens franco-espagnols à l'époque médiévale (in French). Atlantica.
