= Treaty of Guadalajara =

The treaty of Guadalajara was a peace treaty between King Alfonso VIII of Castile and King Sancho VII of Navarre signed at Guadalajara on 29 October 1207. The treaty ended the state of war brought about by Alfonso VIII's invasion of Gascony in 1205 and Sancho VII's alliance with King John of England (dating back to 1201), including his protectorate over the Gascon city of Bayonne.

The treaty was written in Latin and a copy survives. Rodrigo Jiménez de Rada was one of the drafters. Alfonso and Sancho agreed to peace for a term of five years. Each party handed over three castles to the other as security. Navarre gave Irurita, Inzura and San Adrián, while Castile gave Clavijo, Jubera and Ausejo. Each king's subjects were granted freedom of movement in the territory of the other in groups of no more than 100 cavalry. It was further agreed that a similar treaty should be sought between Sancho VII and King Peter II of Aragon. The treaty of Monteagudo was not signed until 1209.
