= Louis, Prince of Lambesc =

Louis
- Prince of Lambesc
- Born: 13 February 1692
- Died: 9 September 1743 (aged 51)
- Spouse: Jeanne Henriette Marguerite de Durfort (m. 1709)
- Issue Detail: Louise, Princess of Thurn and Taxis; Henriette Julienne, Duchess of Cadaval; Louis, Prince of Brionne
Names
- Louis de Lorraine
- House: Lorraine
- Father: Henri of Lorraine
- Mother: Marie Madeline d'Epinay

Louis of Lorraine (13 February 1692 – 9 September 1743) was a member of a cadet branch of the House of Lorraine, the House of Guise and known as the Prince de Lambesc.

== Early life ==
Born 13 February 1692, Louis was the son of Prince Henri de Lorraine, Count of Brionne and his wife, Marie Madeleine d'Epinay (1665-1714). He had a younger sister, Marie Louise (1693–1724) who died unmarried.

== Biography ==
As an infant, he was immortalised by the artist François de Troy who painted him with his mother in c. 1697.

He fought alongside his uncle the Count of Armagnac at the Battle of Malplaquet in 1709 and was captured by Prince Eugene of Savoy. He was later created the Governor of Anjou in 1712 and in 1719, he was made a Brigadier of the King's armies.

He died in 1743 being outlived by his wife by seven years.

== Marriage and issue ==
Louis married Jeanne Henriette Marguerite de Durfort, grand daughter of Jacques Henri de Durfort on 22 May 1709. The couple had six children, two of which would have issue:

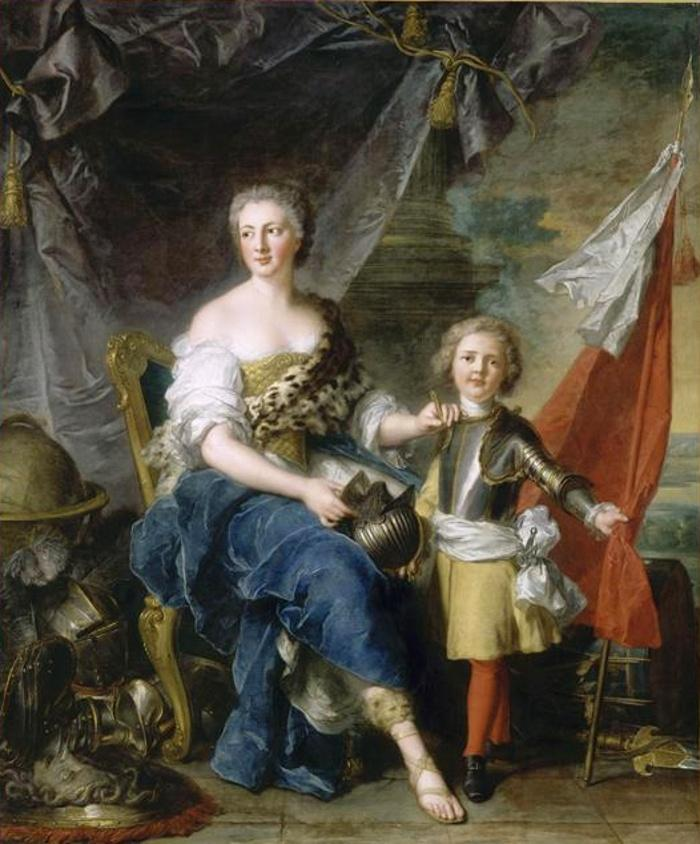
Jeanne Louise & her brother Louis: two children of Louis, Prince of Lambesc

- Jeanne Louise of Lorraine (4 December 1711 – 2 October 1772) never married;
- Louise de Lorraine (21 July 1724 – 6 January 1747) married Alexander Ferdinand, 3rd Prince of Thurn and Taxis, had no issue;
- Henriette Julienne Gabrielle of Lorraine (3 October 1722 – 24 March 1761) married Jaime Álvares Pereira de Melo, 3rd Duke of Cadaval and had issue;
- Louis of Lorraine, Prince of Brionne (10 September 1725 – 28 June 1761) married three times; first to Louise Charlotte de Gramont, daughter of the Duke of Gramont, had no issue; married Auguste de Coëtquen, no issue; lastly married Louise Julie Constance de Rohan and had issue;
- Camille of Lorraine (31 December 1726 – 21 August 1788) never married;
- Henriette Agathe of Lorraine (13 July 1731 – 30 November 1756) never married.

== Sources ==
- Gibiat, Samuel (2006). Hiérarchies sociales et ennoblissement: les commissaires des guerres de la Maison du roi au XVIII siecle (in French). Ecole des Chartes.
