= Gerald IV Trancaléon =

Count of Armagnac and Fezensac (1193–1215)

Géraud IV
- Count of Armagnac and Fezensac
- Coat of arms
- Reign: 1193–1215
- Predecessor: Bernard IV
- Successor: Géraud V
- Died: 1215
- Noble family: Armagnac
- Father: Bernard IV
- Mother: Étiennette

Géraud IV (died 1215), was Count of Armagnac and Fezensac from 1193 until his death in 1215. He was the son of Bernard IV and his wife Étiennette.

== Life ==
Géraud IV succeeded his father, Bernard IV, as count of Armagnac and Fezensac in 1193. In 1204, he appeared as a witness to a peace treaty between his cousin Vézian II, Viscount of Lomagne and Raymond VI, Count of Toulouse.

He took part on the side of Alfonso VIII of Castile during Alfonso's failed military action in Gascony as part of his claim to Gascony as the dowry of his wife Eleanor of England from 1205 until the claim was abandoned shortly after 1206. Géraud IV also accompanied Alfonso VIII into the Kingdom of Castile.

Géraud IV died childless in 1215, and the counties passed to his cousin Géraud V.
