= Odo of Fézensac =

10th-century count

Odo (died 985) was the second Count of Fézensac from 960 to his death.

Odo was the eldest son and successor of William Garcés. Odo's younger brother Bernard received Armagnac in a partition of their father's territory.

Odo spent his first years pillaging neighbouring lands and committing a number infractions against the Church. For this he was nicknamed Falta or the Fool by ecclesiastical chroniclers. In his later life he made amends by donating the church of Saint-Martin de Berdale to the canons of Saint-Marie.

He was succeeded by his only son, Bernard of Fézensac.

== Sources ==
- Histoire de la Gascogne, l'Abbé J-J Montlezun, 1846–50 (online)
- L'art de vérifier les dates des faits historiques, des inscriptions, des chroniques, &c, vol. 9, 1818, pp. 296 ff. (online)
