= County of Fézensac =

French title of nobility

The County of Fézensac was an 8th-century creation on the north-eastern fringes of the Duchy of Gascony following Charlemagne's policy of feudalisation and Frankish colonisation. The move was aimed at offsetting and undermining the authority of the duke of Gascony Lupo II after the setback suffered by the Franks at the Battle of Roncevaux in 778 and failure to restrain the Basques. That advance clearly displeased the Basques, with these policies sparking a stir on the banks of the Garonne (Count of Toulouse Chorso defeated by Odalric "Wasco").

The county was appointed to a count called Burgund, who judging by his name was not a Basque. Burgund died in about 801 and was replaced by a certain Liutard, who was alien to the territory. The new appointment and his fresh military arrangements were met with the hostility of important local officials, who staged a rebellion, burning alive supporters of the new count. Ultimately, the rebellion was quelled and the instigators punished.

However, in 864 we hear of Arnold, Sancho Sanchez's nephew and a native from the area, holding the title of count of Fezensac.

Later in 926, after the death of García II, the Fézensac was given as an appanage to García's second-eldest son William. It included the cities of Vic and Auch, its capital, as well as the territory of Armagnac.

== Carolingian count ==
- Liutard, count of Fezensac then count of Paris (816).

== House of Gascony ==
926–960: William Garcés († 960).

960–985: Odo Falta († 985), son of the previous.

985–1020: Bernard Manciat Tinéa († 1020), son of the previous.

1020–1032: Aymeric I († 1032), son of the previous.

1032–1064: William Astanove I, († 1064), son of the previous.

1064–1103: Aymeric II, († 1103), son of the previous.

1103–1140: Astanove II († 1140), his sons died before him. His daughter Anicelle inherited the county of Fezensac that passed to the house of Armagnac.

Note : In 1777, the Montesquiou family was recognized as descending from the first counts of Fezensac and Louis XVI allowed them to change their name to "de Montesquiou-Fezensac".

== House of Armagnac ==
1140–1160: Géraud III of Armagnac († 1160), count of Armagnac and of Fézensac, husband of Anicelle of Fézensac, countess of Fézensac, daughter of Astanove II, count of Fezensac.

1160–1193: Bernard IV of Armagnac († 1193), count of Armagnac and of Fézensac, son of the previous,

married to Etiennette of la Barthe.

1193–1215: Géraud IV d'Armagnac († 1215), count of Armagnac and of Fézensac, son of the previous.

== House of Lomagne ==
1215–1219: Géraud V d'Armagnac († 1219), count of Armagnac and of Fézensac, son of Bernard of Lomagne, viscount of Fésenzaguet (son of Odon of Lomagne and Mascarose of Armagnac, daughter of Géraud III).

1219–1241: Peter Gérard of Armagnac († 1241), son of the previous.

1241–1243: Bernard V of Armagnac († 1243), brother of the previous,

married to Agnes.

1243–1255: Arnaud Odon of Armagnac († 1256), viscount of Lomagne, nephew of Odon of Lomagne,

married to Mascarose I of Armagnac († 1245), daughter of Géraud V.

1255–1256: Eschivat IV of Chabanais, count of Armagnac and Fézensac and count of Bigorre († 1283),

married in 1255 to Mascarose II of Armagnac († 1256), daughter of Arnaud Odon and Mascarose I of Armagnac.

1256–1285: Gerald VI, Count of Armagnac, comte of Armagnac, († 1285), nephew of Géraud V, son of Roger of Lomagne, viscount of Fésenzaguet,

married in 1260 to Mathe of Béarn.

1285–1319: Bernard of Armagnac, count of Armagnac, († 1319), son of the previous.

married to à Isabelle of lbret († 1 décembre 1294)
married in en 1298 to Cécile of Rodez (1275 † 1313)

1313–1373: Jean I of Armagnac (1311 † 1373), comte of Armagnac and Rodez, son of the previous.

married in 1327 to Béatrice of Clermont († 1364), countess of Charolais

1373–1384: Jean II of Armagnac († 1384), comte of Armagnac and Rodez, son of the previous.

married in 1359 to Jeanne of Périgord.

1384–1391: Jean III of Armagnac († 1391), comte of Armagnac and Rodez, son of the previous.

married in 1378 to Marguerite countess of Comminges.

1391–1418: Bernard VII of Armagnac (1360 † 1418), comte of Armagnac and Rodez, constable of France, brother of the previous.

married to Bonne of Berry (1365 † 1435).

1418–1450: Jean IV of Armagnac (1396 † 1450), count of Armagnac and Rodez, son of the previous.

married in 1407 to Blanche of Bretagne (1395 † 1419), and after in 1419 to Isabelle of Évreux (1395 † 1450)

1450–1473: Jean V of Armagnac (1420 † 1473), count of Armagnac and Rodez, viscount of Lomagne, son of the previous and Isabelle of Évreux.

married in 1469 to Jeanne of Foix.

1473–1497: Charles I of Armagnac (1425 † 1497), count of Armagnac and Rodez, brother of the previous.

married in 1468 to Catherine of Foix († 1510)

== House of Alençon ==
1497–1525: Charles IV of Alençon (1489 † 1525), great-nephew of the previous, his grandfather Jean II duke of Alençon married Marie of Armagnac, daughter of Jean IV.

married in 1509 to Marguerite of France (1492–1549), sister of François I of France.

== House of Albret ==
1527–1555: Henry II of Navarre (1503 † 1555), king of Navarre, count of Foix, count of Bigorre, count of Périgord, count of Armagnac and Rodez,

married in 1527 to Marguerite of France (1492 † 1549)

1555–1572: Jeanne of Albret (1528 † 1572), daughter of the previous, queen of Navarre, ...

married in 1548 to Antoine of Bourbon (1518 † 1562), duke of Vendôme.

1572–1589: Henry IV of France (1553 † 1610), king of France and Navarre, son of the previous.

== House of Guise ==
In 1645, the county of Fezensac is given with the county of Armagnac to Henri of Lorraine-Guise (1601 † 1666), count of Harcourt
