= Bernard of Fézensaguet =

Bernard d'Armagnac (1155–1202) was Lord of Firmacon then Viscount of Fezensaguet from 1182 to 1202. He was the son of Gerald, Count of Armagnac.

== Albigensians ==
In 1171, in support of the Albigensians, Bernard's troops pillaged and partially destroyed the cathedral of Auch. Upon his return, he was banned from entering the city and had to seek refuge at St. Martin's. Later, Count Raymond of Toulouse captured Auch and burned the cathedral.

== Inheritance ==
In 1182, his uncle, Bernard IV, Count of Armagnac and Fézensac, declared him heir to his county and gave him the manor of Fezensaguet.

However, shortly after this, Bernard IV had a son, Gerald IV, who succeeded his father. After Gerald IV died without issue, the eldest son of Bernard Fezensaguet, Gerald V, inherited the counties of Armagnac and the Fézensac.

== Marriage and children ==
Bernard Fezensaguet married to 1172 Géralda, daughter of Roger-Bernard I Count of Foix and Cecile Trencavel.

They had;

- Bernard († 1200).
- Gerald V (1175 † 1219), Viscount of Fézensaguet, then Count of Armagnac and Fézensac.
- Arnaud-Bernard d'Armagnac († 1226).
- Odon d'Armagnac († 1229).
- Roger I (1190 † 1245), Viscount of Fézensaguet

== Sources ==
- Lodge, Eleanor C. (1926). Gascony under English Rule. Methuen & Co. Ltd.
