= Pays d'Orthe =

Region of France

The Pays d'Orthe is a region in the Landes department of Nouvelle-Aquitaine in southwestern France.
