= Mascarose II of Armagnac =

French countess regnant (d. 1254)

Mascarose II of Armagnac (died 1254), was a Countess regnant suo jure of Armagnac and Fézensac in 1246-1254.
