= Gerald V of Armagnac =

French nobleman

Gerald V d'Armagnac (died 1219), Count of Armagnac and Fézensac from 1215 to 1219, was the son of Bernard d'Armagnac, Viscount of Fézensaguet and Geralda of Foix.

In 1182, his great-uncle the Count Bernard IV of Armagnac, made Gerald's father, Bernard, heir in case he died without children. But Gerald IV Trancaléon was born in the years that followed and it was not until 1215 that Gerald IV died childless, and Gerald V became Count of Armagnac and Fézensac.

On 8 June 1215, to avoid the fate of Count Raymond VI of Toulouse, he acknowledged Simon de Montfort as overlord. In 1217, Count Raymond VI rebelled against Simon de Montfort. Simon called Gerald for help and their troops laid siege to the city and conquered the surrounding country, and Isle-Jourdain was given to Gerald. Simon was killed during the Siege of Toulouse.

== Marriage and children ==
- Peter Gerard († 1241), Count of Armagnac and Fézensac
- Bernard V († 1245), Count of Armagnac and Fézensac after his brother
- Mascarose I († 1249), Countess of Armagnac and Fézensac, married Arnaud Odon († 1256), Viscount Lomagne.

== Confusion surrounding numbering ==
Some historians and genealogists, including the famous Pere Anselme de Sainte-Marie, confuse him with Gerald IV. It is for this reason that his nephew who became Earl Gerald of Lomagne is sometimes numbered Gerald V instead of VI.

== See also ==
- House of Armagnac

== Sources ==
- Lodge, Eleanor C. (1926). Gascony under English Rule. Methuen & Co. Ltd.
