= Arnold I of Astarac =

Arnold I García (also Arnaldo Garcés, Arnau Nonat, Arnaud, or Arnaut) (died 960) was the first Count of Astarac from 926.

Arnold was the youngest son of García II Sánchez of Gascony and Amuna. When García died, his duchy was divided between his heirs. The eldest, Sancho, inherited Gascony itself, while the second, William, inherited Fézensac. Arnold inherited Astarac, between Fézensac and Bigorre, comprising Pardiac and Magnoac. Arnold was succeeded by his son García of Astarac.

The chief sources of his reign are the Cartulary of Auch and the Códice de Roda.

== Sources ==
- Collins, Roger. The Basques. Blackwell Publishing: London, 1990.
- Sedycias, João. História da Língua Espanhola.
- Lewis, Archibald R. The Development of Southern French and Catalan Society, 718–1050. University of Texas Press: Austin, 1965.
