= County of Armagnac =

Former county of France

Coordinates: 43.9036°N 0.1522°W

County of Armagnac Comté d'Armagnac
- Before 960–1790
- Coat of Arms before 1304 on left, and after 1304 on right.
- Capital: Auch
- Government
  - Type: County
- Duke of Gascony (to 1453) King of France (from then)
  - c. 950–961: Sancho V Sánchez of Gascony
  - 1422–1453: King Henry VI of England
  - 1453–1461: King Charles VII of France
  - 1774–1790: King Louis XVI
- Count of Armagnac
  - ?–960: William Garcés of Fézensac
  - 1718–1751: Charles de Lorraine
- Historical era: Middle Ages/Early modern period
  - County created: Before 960
  - Decree dividing France into departments: 1790
Preceded by	Succeeded by
Duchy of Gascony	Gers; Landes

The County of Armagnac (US: /ˌɑːrmənˈjæk, ˌɑːrmɑːnˈjɑːk/, French: [aʁmaɲak]; Gascon: Armanhac), situated between the Adour and Garonne rivers in the lower foothills of the Pyrenees, was a historic county of the Duchy of Gascony, established in 601 in Aquitaine (now France). In 960, the title of 'Count of Armagnac' was established, and thus the County of Armagnac was created. In 1751, following the death of childless Charles de Lorraine, Comte d'Armagnac, the title of the county was absorbed into the Crown lands of France and the King, then Louis XV took the title of 'Count of Armagnac' (Comte d'Armagnac). In 1791, following the decree dividing France into departments, the county was disestablished, but remains an important natural region of France.

== History ==
Under Roman rule, Armagnac was included in the Civitas Ausciorum, or district of Auch, of Aquitania. Under the Merovingians it was part of the duchy of Aquitania. Near the end of the ninth century the part now known as Fezensac became an hereditary county. In 960, Armagnac was separated from Fezensac as a separate county, under Bernard le Louche, Géraud Trancaléon and Bernard II, who reunited under his control all of Gascony (1040–1052); in 1052 Gascony became part of "Aquitania", by personal union of duke William VIII. About 1140 Bernard's grandson, Géraud III, briefly reunited the comté of Fezensac, which was then detached as an appanage for a younger son, styled comté de Fézensaguet. When Gascogne was linked once more to Aquitaine by the Treaty of Meaux in 1229, the county of Armagnac was the most powerful of the fiefs of Gascony. The chance of dynastic succession continued repeatedly to separate Fezensac.

The three great territorial lords in the south were the Count of Armagnac, the Count of Foix, and the Lord of Albret. The counts of Armagnac increased their territory through marriage and purchase. Jean I, comte d'Armagnac (1319–1373) and his successors joined to Armagnac the comté of Rodez and that of Carlat, and the vicomtés of Lomagne and Auvillars, Comminges and briefly Charolais (which Jean III alienated in 1390).

During the Hundred Years' War the southern part of France, including Armagnac, was ceded to England by the Treaty of Brétigny (1360). Edward of Woodstock, the Black Prince, administered the region for his father, King Edward III of England. Woodstock asserted his authority in 1355 by laying waste on the countries lying between Bordeaux and Languedoc. He soon alienated the nobles by giving privileges to the towns and levying heavy taxes. Until this time Armagnac had remained practically independent by shifting alliances, but the rule of the Black Prince was so harsh that the count of Armagnac appealed to the French king for help in 1369. By submitting themselves to King Charles V of France, noble families like the Armagnacs were able to retain much of their former power and assure themselves of protection.

In 1410 the daughter of Count Bernard VII of Armagnac (d. 1418) was married to Duke Charles I of Orleans. Charles' father had been killed by supporters of the duke of Burgundy, who resented Orleans' influence on the king. After the marriage, the Armagnac family became associated with the part of King Charles VI against Burgundy, and the royal faction came to be called Armagnacs. Until his death in 1418, Count Bernard remained a bitter enemy of Burgundy. When Burgundy allied itself with England during the later stages of the Hundred Years' War, the friction between the two parties greatly increased. The two factions engaged in a bloody civil war that ended in 1435.

After peace was established, many veterans originally recruited by Count Bernard VII formed mercenary bands that also became known as the Armagnacs. Although they were in the service of King Charles VII, the Armagnacs became notorious for their rapacious plundering in the north of France. In 1444 they were sent to Switzerland on an expedition known as the Armagnac War, which culminated in a battle between the Swiss and the Armagnac mercenaries on August 26, 1444. Although the Swiss were badly defeated, their determined resistance persuaded the Armagnacs to withdraw from Switzerland. Soon after, the Armagnacs were incorporated into Charles VII's regular army.

After the death of Bernard VII in 1418, the counts of Armagnac gradually lost their powerful position in southern France. In the late fifteenth century Count Jean V opposed King Louis XI. He plotted repeatedly against the king, was excommunicated by the pope for his lecherousness and was finally killed by the king's soldiers in 1473, in Lectoure under siege. After the last count died in 1497, Armagnac was united temporarily with the crown. However, King Francis I gave the district to a nephew of the last count, and it subsequently passed by marriage to the family of Henry of Navarre. Henry became king of France as Henry IV in 1589 and joined Armagnac to the royal domain in 1607. In 1645, Louis XIV granted the title to Henri de Lorraine-Harcourt, whose heirs possessed it until the Revolution.

== Government ==
In 1473, following the control of the county by Louis XI, the Seneschalcy of Armagnac was created. This allowed a seneschal to be stationed in the county, acting as a court of appeal and agent of the crown. The county was placed under the legal supervision of the Parliament of Toulouse. Administration and taxation were performed by the Generalité of Montauban and the Cour des Aides of Cahors. By the mid-17th century, the seneschalcy was transferred to Auch, and Lectoure lost its status as capital city.

The Wars of Religion saw considerable damage inflicted on the county by Catholics and Protestants alike. Large sections of the nobility and the bourgeoisie had become Calvinists, including in the capital Lectoure. Some towns had become entirely Protestant. Many Protestants emigrated from the country before and after the Revocation of the Edict of Nantes and joined the armies of European monarchies against King Louis.

During the 17th and 18th centuries, the County of Armagnac was an administrative division of the General Government of Guyenne and Gascony (Gouvernement-Général de Guienne et Gascogne). During this period the government was divided into the Duchy of Guyenne and the Duchy of Gascony; the division was part of the latter.

Following the decree dividing France into departments announced on 22 December 1789, the County of Armagnac was disestablished. The majority of the county formed part of the new Department of Gers, the far western parts became part of Landes, and the southernmost parishes rejoined Hautes-Pyrénées, formerly called Bigorre.

== Geography ==
The region is watered by several small rivers that descend from the Lannemezan plateau; the river Gers is the largest of these. The region is centered at approximately 43°40'N 0°12'E (43.7, 0.2).

== Bibliography ==
- The Encyclopedia Americana, 1977
