= William Garcés of Fézensac =

Count of Fézensac

William García (also Guillaume Garcès or Guillermo Garcés) (died 960) was a Count of Fézensac. He was the second son of García II of Gascony and Amuna.

When García II died in or around 926, he gave Gascony to his eldest son Sancho IV and created appanages for his younger sons: Fézensac for William and Astarac for Arnold. Fézensac included Auch, Vic, and the Armagnac.

William himself divided his county amongst his heirs:

- Odo, successor in Fézensac
- Bernard, received Armagnac
- Fredelon, received Gaure
- Garsinda, married Raymond II of Ribagorza
