= Count of Armagnac =

French noble title

Coat of arms of the County of Armagnac (before 1304).

Coat of arms of the County of Armagnac (after 1304).

The following is a list of rulers of the County of Armagnac:

== House of Armagnac ==
- William Count of Fézensac and Armagnac ?–960
- Bernard the Suspicious, first count privative of Armagnac 960–?
- Gerald I Trancaléon ?–1020
- Bernard II Tumapaler 1020–1061
- Gerald II 1061–1095
- Arnauld-Bernard II (associated 1072 for about ten years)
- Bernard III 1095–1110
- Gerald III 1110–1160
- Bernard IV 1160–1188
- Gerald IV Trancaléon 1188–1215
- Gerald V 1215–1219
  - Bernart Arnaut d'Armagnac 1217–1226, in opposition
- Pierre-Gerald 1219–1241
- Bernard V 1241–1245
- Mascarose I (countess) 1245
- Arnauld II, Count of Lectoure and Lomagne 1245–1249
- Mascarose II 1249–1256
- Eskivat de Chabanais, Lord of Chabannais 1249–1256
- Gerald VI 1256–1285
- Bernard VI 1285–1319
- Jean I 1319–1373
- Jean II the Hunchbacked 1373–1384
- Jean III 1384–1391
- Bernard VII 1391–1418
- Jean IV 1418–1450
- Jean V 1450–1473
- Charles I 1473–1497

== House of Alençon ==
- Charles II 1509–1525

== House of Albret ==
- Henri I 1527–1555
- Jeanne of Albret 1555–1572
- Henry II (king of France as Henry IV 1572–1589)

== House of Lorraine ==
- Henry de Lorraine, the Young 1607–1666
- Louis de Lorraine 1666–1718, son of the above;
- Charles de Lorraine 1718–1751, son of the above.
