= County of Vasconia Citerior =

Medieval domain

The County of Vasconia Citerior (literally, the "nearer Vasconia") was a medieval domain attested as of 824. It may have comprised the lands between the western Pyrenees and the river Adour.

After Pepin the Short's war on Aquitaine, Charlemagne started Frankish penetration into the Duchy of Vasconia (778) by taking the Church on his side and appointing Frankish and Burgundian counts loyal to him, even creating new counties on Vasconia's lands (Fezensac), or expanding existing ones (Toulouse), thereby fragmenting the previous autochthonous territorial and political unity. The territory farther away from the Garonne was made into a county.

The Basque count (also cited as duke) Aznar Sanchez led the Carolingian expedition against Pamplona in 824, and was captured, but he was released years later for his kinship with the captors. The region to the north of the Pyrenees remained in a state of rebellion, and Aznar Sanchez, count of Hither Vasconia, makes a comeback opposing Pepin I, but he was killed in 836 in confusing circumstances ("died a horrible death").

His brother Sancho II Sanchez (Sans Sancion) succeeded him. He opposed both the family of Seguin II family based in the region of Bordeaux, as well as central Frankish authority, namely Pepin I and Louis the Pious, who were reluctant to acknowledge him as Duke of Vasconia. Sancho supported Pepin II of Aquitaine until Sancho took over most of present-day Gascony, and eventually Charles the Bald confirmed him as duke of Vasconia (851). The county seems to have been re-incorporated to Gascony (Vasconia) with Sancho II Sanchez, but his lineage was broken soon after, and a new dynasty of Gascon Basque dukes seem to have taken over.

While records on the region of the Adour are scanty thereafter for the next 150 years, Garcia II Sanchez is cited with the title comes et marchio in limitibus oceani ("count and margrave to the limits of the ocean") in 886. Vikings are attested during this period as raiding upstream the banks of the Adour, destroying also monasteries not heard of thereafter. The Norsemen stationed themselves at the mouth of the Adour in or next to Bayonne, and in other coastal areas, until they were definitely defeated by William II Sanchez of Gascony (982). In 1020, the County of Labourd and Bayonne emerged for the first time in the same area as a result of a treaty between Pamplona and Gascony.

== Bibliography ==
- Clémens, J. (1987). "Hispania citerior et Vasconia citerior au IX^{e} siècle". Le Sud Ouest et la péninsule ibérique. Pau. pp. 87–97.
- Collins, Roger (1990). The Basques (2nd ed.). Oxford: Basil Blackwell. ISBN 0631175652.
- Collins, Roger (1990b). "Pippin I and the Kingdom of Aquitaine". In Roger Collins; Peter Godman (eds.). Charlemagne's Heir: New Perspectives on the Reign of Louis the Pious (814–840). Oxford: Clarendon Press. pp. 363–89.
- Collins, Roger (2012). Caliphs and Kings: Spain, 796–1031. London: Wiley Blackwell. ISBN 978-1-118-73001-0.
- Jaurgain, Jean de (1898). La Vasconie: Étude historique et critique sur les origines du royaume de Navarre, du duché de Gascogne, des comtés de Comminges, d'Aragon, de Foix, de Bigorre, d'Alava et de Biscaye, de la vicomté de Béarn et des grands fiefs du duché de Gascogne. Vol. Première Partie. Pau: Garet.
- Pépin, Guilhem (2005). "Les Aquitains et les Gascons au haut moyen âge: l'affirmation des deux peuples". Bulletin de la Société de Borda. 130 (479): 321–40.
- Sénac, Philippe (1999). "Estudio sobre los primeros condes aragoneses". Aragón en la Edad Media. 14: 1501–06.
