= Adalric of Gascony =

8th-century Basque lord in Gascony

Adalric was probably a Basque lord in the late eighth century in Gascony. He has been called a possible Duke of Gascony by some scholars.

He was a possible son of Lupo II of Gascony. After Lupo's death, Adalric controlled western Gascony including Lower Navarre, Béarn, and Bigorre. His brother Sancho controlled the east.

In 788, he captured Chorso of Toulouse and made him swear a humiliating oath, either to himself or to Lupo II. Upon this Chorso was released, but Charlemagne dismissed him from his post. This incident gives rise to the notion that Adalric was in fact an independent Basque duke in Gascony, though others interpret him as a rival Carolingian count.

According to the spurious Charte d'Alaon, Adalric was captured by forces of Charlemagne and exiled to Hispania, later being killed in battle. This charter also makes him the father of Seguin I of Bordeaux and Centule. His relationships are, in fact, unknown.

== Sources ==
- Collins, Roger. The Basques. Blackwell Publishing: London, 1990.
- "Astronomus", Vita Hludovici imperatoris, ed. G. Pertz, ch. 2, in Mon. Gen. Hist. Scriptores, II, 608.
- Monlezun, Jean Justin. Histoire de la Gascogne. 1864.
