= Sancho Sánchez (disambiguation) =

Sancho Sánchez may refer to:

- Sancho II Sánchez of Gascony (died c. 860), duke
- Sancho III Mitarra of Gascony (died c. 890), duke, possibly son of previous
- Sancho V Sánchez of Gascony (died c. 961), duke
- Sancho Sánchez (died c. 1116), a Navarrese magnate
- Sancho VII of Navarre (died 1234), king
