= Bernard I =

Bernard I (or Bernardo, Bernhard) may refer to:

- Bernard of Septimania, also known as Bernard I of Toulouse (born 795)
- Bernard I of Poitiers (died 844)
- Bernard I of Armagnac (died 995), called 'the Suspicious', first duke of Armagnac
- Bernard I William of Gascony (died c. 1009)
- Bernard I, Duke of Saxony (died 1011)
- Bernard I of Bigorre, (962–1034)
- Bernard I of Berga, count of Berga in 1035–1050
- Bernard II Tumapaler of Gascony (died 1064x1090), sometimes counted as Bernard I
- Bernhard I, Lord of Lippe (c. 1090 – c. 1158)
- Bernard I de Balliol (died 1164)
- Bernhard I, Prince of Anhalt-Bernburg (c. 1218–1287)
- Bernard I, Margrave of Baden-Baden (died 1431)
- Bernard I, Duke of Brunswick-Lüneburg (died 1434)
- Bernardo I of Kongo (died 1567)
- Bernhard I, Duke of Saxe-Meiningen (1649–1706)
