= Chorso =

Torson (known variously as Tercin, Torso, Chorso, and Chorson) was the first count (or duke) of Toulouse (778 – 789 or 790).

He is called Chorso dux Tholosanus by the so-called "Astronomer" in his Vita Hludovici ("Life of Louis", year 789). Torson was the regent of Aquitaine during the first years of the reign of Louis the Pious there (from 781). In 788, he was captured by the Gascon Adalric and made to swear an oath of allegiance to the Duke of Gascony, Lupus II. This was the reason for his dismissal upon his release.

Count of Toulouse; 778–790	Succeeded by William of Gellone
