= Urraca Garcés (countess) =

Urraca Garcés (c. 944 – c. 1000) was a Pamplonese infanta who was by marriage the countess of Castile (961/4–970) and duchess of Gascony (972/3–994/9). She had no children by her first marriage, but three sons and four daughters by her second.

== Countess of Castile ==
Urraca was born around 944, the daughter of King García Sánchez I of Pamplona and Queen Teresa Ramírez. Her father's sister, Sancha Sánchez, was the wife of Count Fernán González of Castile. After Sancha died sometime between 959 and 963, the count married Urraca. The marriage took place sometime after 961, for in that year Urraca was still at the Pamplonese court, and before 5 May 964, when she is recorded beside her husband. The marriage most likely took place in 963 or 964. It did not produce children.

Later popular traditions combined stories of Fernán González's two wives without naming Urraca. According to the version of the tale in the Poema de Fernán González, King García lured Fernán to a meeting to discuss his proposed marriage to the king's daughter but imprisoned him instead. The king's daughter then approached the count in prison and promised to secure his release in return for marriage. The earliest version of this story is found in the Crónica najerense of around 1160, although the count's imprisonment by García is recorded in the Anales compostelanos from around 1000, which dates the incident to 960. In the original version of the legend, the princess was Urraca. The story, however, has no historical validity.

== Duchess of Gascony ==
After Fernán González died in 970, Urraca returned to Pamplona, to the court of her brother, King Sancho II. She is recorded there in 971 and 972, witness two acts in favour of San Millán de la Cogolla. Sometime after 14 July 972 and before the end of 973, she married Count William Sánchez of Bordeaux. In 976, because of this marriage alliance, he led the Pamplonese forces against al-Mansur. From 977, he was recognized as the Duke of Gascony. Urraca, however, always bore the title countess (comitissa), but was sometimes qualified as "of royal lineage" (ex regali stirpe). At Lescar, she and her husband founded an abbey dedicated to the Virgin Mary, which became Lescar Cathedral. They made a donation to the abbey of Sorde. In 988, they founded Saint-Sever in fullfillment of a vow made by William before his victory over the Vikings.

Urraca was still living in 994. The duke died between 997 and 999. She was dead by 1008, when her son, Duke Bernard William, referred in a charter to "my mother Urraca of holy memory". Although the year of her death is not known, the day is recorded in an obituary as 28 June. Her second son, Sancho VI, also became duke of Gascony. She and William had one other son, name unknown, and four daughters: Alausia, Brisca, Adalais and Garsenda.

== Works cited ==
- Keller, Jean Paul (1954). "Inversion of the Prison Episodes in the Poema de Fernán González". Hispanic Review. 22 (4): 253–263. JSTOR 471247.
- Martínez Díez, Gonzalo (2005). El condado de Castilla, 711–1038: la historia frente a la la leyenda. Vol. 1. Marcial Pons Historia.
- Mussot-Goulard, Renée (1982). Les Princes des Gascogne, 768–1070. CTR Éditeur.
- Mussot-Goulard, Renée (1996). Histoire de la Gascogne. Presses universitaires de France.
- Salazar y Acha, Jaime de (2021). Las dinastías reales de España en la Edad Media (PDF). Real Academia de la Historia.
- Salazar y Acha, Jaime de (2022). "Urraca Garcés de Pamplona". Diccionario Biográfico Español. Real Academia de la Historia.
