= Vasconia =

Basque region from 5th to 8th centuries

- Late 5th century–8th century
- Extent of Vasconia in the early 8th century
- Common languages: Aquitanian (Proto-Basque), Medieval Latin
- Religion: Catholic Christianity and Basque paganism
- Historical era: Early Middle Ages
  - Emergence as a distinct territory: Late 5th century
  - Integration into successor states: 8th century
Preceded by
Western Roman Empire
Novempopulania
Hispania Tarraconensis
Succeeded by
Duchy of Vasconia
Kingdom of Aquitaine
Kingdom of Pamplona
- Today part of: Basque country (France and Spain)

Vasconia (Latin: Vasconia; sometimes written Wasconia; Basque: Baskonia) refers to a large territory inhabited, structured, and defended by the Vascones from the late 6th century until the 11th century. This territory served as a buffer zone or natural line of defense against incursions from external powers such as the Franks, the Visigoths, and the Umayyads.

Far from being merely a marginal zone dominated by neighboring powers, Vasconia was an autonomous space where Basque-speaking communities preserved their own institutions, language, and ways of life. There were two regions of Vasconia, separated by the natural frontier of the Pyrenees, but united by a common historical dynamic:

- The Citerior Vasconia (Lower Vasconia), south of the Pyrenees, was centered around the city of Pamplona. It was long contested by the Visigoths, Franks, and the Umayyads of Córdoba. In the early 9th century, the Kingdom of Pamplona emerged here, forming the foundation of the future Kingdom of Navarre. A branch of local Basque leadership developed in this area, led by regional elites.
- The Ulterior Vasconia (Upper Vasconia), north of the Pyrenees, included both Aquitani and Basque-speaking peoples, often using highly regional dialects. It became the Duchy of Vasconia, a political entity whose name officially replaced that of Novempopulania in 626. The Vascones maintained a continuous presence from the late 6th century. The Frankish attempt to organize the region by creating a Duchy of Vasconia did not mark submission, but rather a tactical acknowledgment of the authority of local chieftains, often of Basque origin. These dukes or princeps exercised real military and administrative authority, as evidenced by their court in Saint-Sever, referred to as Caput Vasconiae. A Basque dynasty ruled there, closely linked to that of Pamplona in the south.

Several attempts were made to reunify both parts of Vasconia. The Navarrese king Sancho III the Great proclaimed himself king of all Vasconia, while his cousin, the Duke of Gascony Sancho William, acted as his political ally. Despite their coordination, Sancho William never paid homage to the king of the Franks, and their plan for Pyrenean unification failed after Sancho III's death, leading to a period of political fragmentation.

Despite this disintegration, cross-Pyrenean ties persisted. The southern Vascones supported the Aquitanians during their revolts against the Carolingians, just as they had earlier opposed Rome. When the House of Plantagenet imposed its rule over Gascony, local jurists emphasized the special status of Basque land, considered an allod—a type of freeholding not subject to the Frankish crown.

Thus, despite pressure from the north (Franks, Carolingians) and the south (Córdoba, and later the Christian kingdoms), Vasconia retained its cultural and political autonomy for several centuries.
