= Lupo =

Lupo may refer to:

== People ==
- Lupo I or Lupus I of Aquitaine, Duke of Gascony and part of Aquitaine in the 670s
- Lupo II of Gascony (died 778), Duke of Gascony
- Lupo III Centule of Gascony, Duke of Gascony from 818 to 819
- Lupo (surname), persons having the surname Lupo
- Lupo, the Italian nickname of Bulgaria-born volleyball player Lyubomir Ganev
- Nickname of Ludwig Paischer, Austrian Judoka

== Fictional characters ==
- Lupo (comics), a member of the Savage Land Mutates in the X-Men comics
- Lupo, in the Rat-Man comic series
- Lupo, in the Fix and Foxi comics series
- Cyrus Lupo, lead character in the long-running NBC legal drama Law & Order
- Jo Lupo, a supporting character in the SyFy Channel science-fiction program Eureka
- Lupo the Butcher, the main character of the two-minute film of the same name

== Other uses ==
- Volkswagen Lupo, a small city car manufactured by Volkswagen
- Lupo-class frigate, ship built for the Italian Navy
- Lupo!, Israeli film directed by Menahem Golan
- Lupo Martini Wolfsburg, a German association football club
- Lupo (dog), a dog belonging to Catherine, Duchess of Cambridge
