= Sancho I of Gascony =

Duke of Gascony (died 812)

Sancho I López or Lupus Sancho (also Lupo; Basque: Antso Otsoa, French: Sanche Loup, Gascony: Sans Lop) was a Duke of Gascony between the years 801 and 812.

His parentage is unknown, but onomastics and chronology indicate that he may have been a son of Lupus II. This is especially likely if the early dukes of Gascony are to be regarded as related.

Sancho first appears (as Lupus Sancho) in the historical record as dux "of the Vascones." This means that he was almost certainly a Basque. He was a leader of the army of Louis the Pious which besieged and took Barcelona in 801. He was probably the leader of the Gascon contingent. Ermoldus Niger celebrates him in a poem as a nutritus of Charlemagne, perhaps indicating that he was raised at the Frankish king's court. This has led to speculation that he was initially sent by Charlemagne to pacify the Gascons and be their duke: a royal Frankish appointee.

He was the probable elder brother of Lupus Centule, Seguin I, and Garsand (García) and father of Aznar and Sancho II. It is possible that Sancha, the wife of Emenon, was his daughter or granddaughter. Sancho died on an unknown date before 812 and was probably succeeded by his brother Seguin. He has been reputed as the father of Dhuoda.

== Sources ==
- Collins, Roger. The Basques. Blackwell Publishing: London, 1990.
- Einhard. ''Annales Regni Francorum''.
- Lewis, Archibald R. The Development of Southern French and Catalan Society, 718–1050. University of Texas Press: Austin, 1965.
- Astronomus. Vita Hludovici imperatoris, ed. G. Pertz, ch. 2, in Mon. Gen. Hist. Scriptores, II, 608.
- Chronicle of Moissac.
- Ermoldus Nigellus. Carmina in honorem Hludovici, ed. E. Dummier, I, in Mon. Ger. Hist. Scriptores, I, 472–475.
- Sedycias, João. História da Língua Espanhola.
- Monlezun, Jean Justin. Histoire de la Gascogne. 1864.
