= Bernard II Tumapaler =

- Count of Armagnac

Duke of Gascony
- Reign: 1039 - 1052
- Predecessor: Odo of Gascony
- Successor: William VIII, Duke of Aquitaine
- Born: c. 1020
- Died: between 1064 and 1090
- Noble family: House of Armagnac
- Spouse: Ermengard
- Issue: Arnold; Girard; Gisela
- Father: Gerald I, Count of Armagnac
- Mother: Adalais

Bernard II Tumapaler (or Tumpaler, Occitan: Bernat, Spanish: Bernardo; c. 1020 – between 1064 and 1090) was Duke of Gascony from 1039 to 1052 and Count of Armagnac from 1020 to 1061.

Bernard was the son of Adalais, daughter of William V of Aquitaine and Prisca, and Girard I Trancaleon, whom he succeeded in Armagnac. Prisca was a daughter of William II of Gascony and it was through her that Bernard inherited his Gascon claim. Prisca's claim was passed to her son Odo on the death of her brother Sancho VI in 1032. Bernard was recognised duke in turn on the death of his uncle Odo in 1039, but probably only in the southern regions and not in the region around Bordeaux. Later his title to Gascony was contested by his uncle Guy Geoffrey, younger half-brother of Odo, but not descended from William II. Guy Geoffrey, however, was married to Garsenda, daughter of Aldabert II of Périgord and Alausia, the second daughter of the late Sancho VI.

Eventually, after a protracted fight, Bernard was defeated at the Battle of La Castelle (fought between Cazères and Grenade on the Adour) and had to relinquish Gascony to Guy Geoffrey for 15,000 sous. However, by then the title was almost empty, as most of Gascony had been dismembered and parcelled out as appanages, being in the hand of the counts of Béarn, Bigorre, Armagnac, Comminges, Astarac. Guy Geoffrey had only conquered a rump Gascony. Bernard fought the archbishop of Auch, partisan of Guy Geoffrey. He abdicated from Gascony before 4 May 1052 and Armagnac by 1061. He may have entered a monastery. In May 1063, he led a rebellion of the Gascon barons against Guy Geoffrey, who had inherited the Duchy of Aquitaine in the meanwhile, but was soundly defeated and Gascony firmly bound to Aquitaine. He disappeared from history, but is not surely dead until 1090.

He married Ermengard and had three children:

- Arnold
- Girard, along with Arnold made a joint donation to the Abbey of Cluny in 1049.
- Gisela married Centule V of Béarn

== Sources ==
- Higounet, Charles. Bordeaux pendant le haut moyen age. Bordeaux, 1963.
