= William the Good, Count of Bordeaux =

William the Good (French: Guillaume le Bon) was the count of Bordeaux in the final decades of the 10th century. The last recorded count of Bordeaux before him was Amalvinus, who flourished in the first decade of the century. Little is known of his rule, which may have been occupied by defence against Viking raids. On his death the County of Bordeaux passed to Duke William Sánchez of Gascony.

An early 11th-century notice attributed to Hugh, bishop of Agen, in the History of the Abbey of Condom (Latin Historia abbatiae Condomensis) says that at the time when William the Good was captured, probably by Vikings, Hugh's uncle, Duke William of Gascony, made a donation to the Abbey of Condom, which Hugh had founded.

There were conflicting traditions in the 12th century over whether the Abbey of Sainte-Croix in Bordeaux, which had been destroyed by Vikings, was restored by William the Good before 977 or by Duke William V of Aquitaine in 1027. Since William V certainly had non influence in Bordeaux in 1027, it seems likely that the two Williams were confused and that the actual founder was the obscure Count of Bordeaux. This is supported by a papal bull issued by Urban II on 27 April 1099, which states that "William of good memory, the count of Bordeaux, by his right granted" the abbey an endowment and the right to rebuild.

According to documents from Sainte-Croix, William's father was Raymond and his mother was Entregodis (Andregoto), probably the daughter of that name of Duke García II Sánchez of Gascony. The name Raymond may indicate a family connection to the counts of Toulouse. If this genealogy is correct, William was the first cousin of William Sánchez, and the latter was his heir. William was succeeded as count sometime between 977 and 988.
