= Sancho III Mitarra of Gascony =

Sancho III (Basque: Antso, Sanzio, Santio, Sanxo, Santzo, Santxo, or Sancio; French: Sanche; Gascon: Sans), called Mitarra (from the Arabic for "terror" or "the terrible"), Menditarra (meaning "the mountaineer" in Basque), was the Duke of Gascony in a very obscure period of its history between 864 and 893. He was probably duke from 872 to 887. He is shrouded in mystery and legend, but is regarded as a great fighter of the Reconquista elected to his post as Carolingian power waned by the native Gascons.

His genealogy is obscure, but he was probably a son of Sancho II Sánchez. There is much confusion among the sources about the identity of Sancho Mitarra. Some give that sobriquet to Sancho II, while some give it to Sancho III. Some call the latter Mitarra Sancho and call him a son of the former. It seems likely that these two Sanchos are related. Genealogies of a "phantasmagorical" character assign to him a Castilian parentage.

During the reign of Sancho III, Gascony became de facto independent, owing no allegiance to the King of France. He settled the Vikings at the mouth of the Adour and brought them under control. He was succeeded by either his son (most likely) or his brother, García II Sánchez.

== Sources ==
- Collins, Roger. The Basques. Blackwell Publishing: London, 1990.
- Higounet, Charles. Bordeaux pendant le haut moyen age. Bordeaux, 1963.
- Sedycias, João. História da Língua Espanhola.
