= Sancho II =

Sancho II may refer to:

- Sancho II of Pamplona (b. aft. 935–994), King of Pamplona and Count of Aragon (970–994)
- Sancho II of Castile (1040–1072), King of Castile (1065–1072) and León (1072)
- Sancho II of Portugal (1207–1248), King of Portugal (1223–1248)
- Sancho II of Gascony
