= Odo of Gascony =

11th-century duke of Gascony and Aquitaine

Odo (French: Eudes or Odon, Latin: Odonis; c. 1010 – 10 March 1039/1040 (Note: Higounet gives 1040)) was Duke of Gascony from 1032 and then Duke of Aquitaine and Count of Poitou from 1038.

== Family ==
He was a member of the House of Poitiers, the second son of William V of Aquitaine, the eldest by his second wife Brisca, daughter of William II of Gascony.

== Control over Gascony and Bordeaux ==
The Chronicle of Saint-Maixent and Adhemar of Chabannes are the chief sources for his reign. He was subscribing donation charters to Saint-Cyprien with his father and mother and his brother Theobald, who died young, before 1018. He inherited Gascony in 1032 after the death of his uncle Sancho VI. In 1033, Odo took possession of the County of Bordeaux, traditional seat of the Gascon dukes.

== Control over Aquitaine and Poitou ==
At the death of his half-brother William VI in 1038, he succeeded as Duke of Aquitaine and Count of Poitou. However, he was killed while asserting his rights in Poitou against his stepmother Agnes of Burgundy and his half-brother William VII. He died in battle at Mauzé defending his recently acquired title there. He was buried in the abbey of Saint-Pierre at Maillezais beside his father and brother. (Note: Probably his half-brother William VI.)

== See also ==
- Dukes of Aquitaine family tree

== Sources ==
- Bachrach, Bernard S. (1993). Fulk Nerra, the Neo-Roman Consul, 987-1040. University of California Press.
- Higounet, Charles (1963). Bordeaux pendant le haut moyen age. Federation Historique Du Sud-Ouest.

| Preceded by Sancho VI | Duke of Gascony; 1032–1039 | Succeeded by Bernard II |
| Preceded by William VI | Duke of Aquitaine; 1038–1039 | Succeeded by William VII |
| Preceded by William VI | Count of Poitou; 1038–1039 | Succeeded by William VII |
