= Lupus II of Gascony =

8th-century Duke of Gascony

Lupo II (died 778) is the third-attested historical Duke of Gascony (dux Vasconum or princeps), appearing in history for the first time in 769. His ancestry is subject to scholarly debate.

In 769, a final rising of the Aquitanians against Charlemagne and Carloman was put down, and the rebel Hunald II was forced to flee to the court of Lupo in Gascony. Lupo had thitherto been his ally, lending him Gascon troops. Lupo, however, did not desire to bring down upon himself the wrath of the Frankish kings and handed Hunald, along with his wife, over to Charlemagne. He himself did homage for his province, recognising Charlemagne's suzerainty.

Lupo may have been of Basque ethnicity but was perhaps Frankish or Roman (Aquitanian). The name Lupo ("wolf", otsoa in Basque) is a well-attested totemic first name and surname widely spread across the whole Basque ethnic area in the early Middle Ages. He may have been a royal appointment of Pepin III (in 768), or he may have been elected duke by the people. The extent of his territory is unknown. He may have ruled all of Aquitaine after 769, though this is unlikely. His Gascony did border the Agenais and its northern border seems to have been the Garonne. Bordeaux was not under his control, but that of a separate line of Carolingian-appointed counts. Lupo's power may or may not have extended to the Pyrenees, but the trans-Pyrenean Basques were also under Carolingian suzerainty, as seen by Einhard's reference to Basque perfidia (treachery) at Roncesvalles. This region may have been part of Lupo's realm. Some historians have nevertheless implicated Lupo in the legendary ambush of Roland.

Lupo probably died in 778. His relationship to the previous dukes of Aquitaine-Vasconia and his successors is unclear. If he is to be regarded as related to subsequent Gascon dukes, which seems reasonable on the basis of patronymics, a genealogy can easily be constructed. He was the father of Sancho, Seguin, Centule (father of Lupus III) and García (Garsand). All of his sons ruled Gascony at one time or another, except García, who died in battle with Berengar of Toulouse in 819. He may also have had another son named Adalric, who was active in the reign of Chorso of Toulouse.

== Sources ==
- Collins, Roger. The Basques. Blackwell Publishing: London, 1990.
- Einhard. Vita Karoli Magni. Translated by Samuel Epes Turner. New York: Harper and Brothers, 1880.
- Lewis, Archibald R. The Development of Southern French and Catalan Society, 718–1050. University of Texas Press: Austin, 1965.
- Lacarra, J. Vasconia medieval: Historia y Filología.
- Wallace-Hadrill, J. M., translator. The Fourth Book of the Chronicle of Fredegar with its Continuations. Greenwood Press: Connecticut, 1960.
- Estornés Lasa, Bernardo. Auñamendi Encyclopedia: Ducado de Vasconia.
- Annales Laurissense, in Mon. Gen. Hist. Scriptores, I, 148.
- "Astronomus", Vita Hludovici imperatoris, ed. G. Pertz, ch. 2, in Mon. Gen. Hist. Scriptores, II, 608.
- Sedycias, João. História da Língua Espanhola.
- Monlezun, Jean Justin. Histoire de la Gascogne. 1864.
