= Sancho III =

Sancho III may refer to:

- King Sancho III of Navarre (c. 985 – 1035)
- King Sancho III of Castile (1134–1158)
- Sancho III of Gascony
