= Aznar Sánchez of Gascony =

Duke of Gascony (died 836)

Aznar (or Asnar) Sánchez (Basque: Aznar Antso, French: Aznard Sanche, Gascon: Aznar Sans) (died 836) was the Duke of Gascony from 820. He was the supposed son of Sancho I of Gascony, though he has been identified with Aznar Galíndez I, Count of Aragon.

In 824, according to the Vita Hludowici, the counts Aznar and Aeblus (Eblus atque Asenarius committees) led an army against rebellious Pamplona. According to the Annales regni Francorum of Einhard, they (Aeblus et Asinarius comites) brought a great deal of wealth with them. They were defeated in a "second Roncesvalles" and Pamplona gained its independence while the two counts were captured. Aznar, however, being a relative (consanguineus) of his captors, according to Astronomus, was released.

Aznar fell out with Berengar's successor in the March of Gothia, Bernard of Septimania. In 828, Gascony revolted again. In 836, Aznar was killed (a horrible death).

== Sources ==
- Collins, Roger (1990). The Basques (2nd ed.). Oxford: Basil Blackwell. ISBN 0631175652.
- Higounet, Charles (1963). Bordeaux pendant le haut moyen âge. Bordeaux: Fédération Historique de Sud-Ouest. OCLC 2272117.
- Higounet, Charles (1948). "Les Aznar: une tentative de groupement de comtés gascons et pyrénéens au IX^{e} siècle". Annales du Midi. 61 (1): 5–14. doi:10.3406/anami.1948.5636.
- Lewis, Archibald R. (1965). The Development of Southern French and Catalan Society, 718–1050. Austin, TX: University of Texas Press.
- Codera y Zaidín, Francisco (1901). "Expedición a Pamplona de los condes francos Eblo y Aznar". Revista de Aragón. 2: 48–52; reprinted in Colección de Estudios Árabes 7 (1903), pp. 185–98.

Preceded by Lupus III	Duke of Gascony; 820–839	Succeeded by Sancho II
