= Pepin of Aquitaine =

Pepin, Peppin, or Pippin of Aquitaine may refer to:

- Pepin I of Aquitaine (797 – 838), King of Aquitaine
- Pepin II of Aquitaine (823 – after 864), King of Aquitaine, son of Pepin I
