= Garcia I =

Garcia I may refer to:

- García I Jiménez of Gascony, duke of Gascony, leader of the Gascons from 816 to his death in 818
- García I Galíndez, count of Aragon (d. 833)
- García Íñiguez of Pamplona (died 882)
- García I of León (died 914)
- García Sánchez I of Pamplona (c. 919 – 970)
- García I of Castile (died 995)
- Garcia I of Kongo (ruled 1624–1626)
