= Emenon =

9th Century Count of Poitou, Périgord, and Angoulême

Emenon (or Emeno) was the Count of Poitou (828–839), Périgord (863–866), and Angoulême (863–866).

It is unknown who nominated him count of Poitou, but it was probably Pepin I of Aquitaine, at whose side he had fought against the emperor Louis the Pious. During his tenure in Poitou, the Empress Judith was imprisoned in the abbey of Sainte-Croix at Poitiers for a while. The country of Herbauges was taken from him and given in benefice to Ragenold of Neustria. When Pepin died, Emenon joined the nobles who proclaimed Pepin II king. Louis invaded Aquitaine and took Poitiers, passing Christmas there in 839 and appointed Ranulf I in his place as count.

Emenon became count of Périgord and Angoulême in 863. He died in battle with Landri, Count of Saintes, who was also killed.

He married Sancha, daughter of Sancho II of Gascony, and left a son, Arnold, who became duke of Gascony. By a second wife, a daughter of Odo I, Count of Troyes, he left two sons: Adhemar (Aymer), who inherited Poitou and Angoulême, and Adalelm, who later became Count of Troyes.
