= Sancho VI =

Sancho VI may refer to:

- Sancho VI William of Gascony (d. 1032)
- Sancho VI of Navarre (1132–1194)
