= Count of Bordeaux =

The Count of Bordeaux (Latin comes Burdagalensis) was the ruler of the city of Bordeaux and its environs in the Merovingian and Carolingian periods. The names of the counts are scarcely known until the ninth century, when they start to take on a larger role because of their strategic importance in the defence against Viking raids. Over the next two centuries, the county of Bordeaux was brought into union with the Duchy of Gascony. The County of Saintes (comitatus Santonicensis) was often held concomitant with Bordeaux.

Towards the end of the tenth century, the counts of Bordeaux began minting money in their own name. There was an active mint at Bordeaux in Merovingian times, and a series of 19 moneyers are known by name between 580 and about 710. Thereafter, minting at Bordeaux ceased until the reign of Louis the Pious as emperor, when the mint was re-opened. After that there is another hiatus until minting was resumed in the king's name under Louis IV (936–54) and Lothair (954–86). Subsequently obols are known bearing the names of William, Bernard, Sancho and Odo. The coins of William may belong to the time of William the Good or his successor, William Sánchez.

== List of counts ==
- Sigulf (fl. 575)
- Warnachar (fl. 584)
- Galactorius (fl. 585), defensor civitatis (defender of the city)
- Seguin I (c. 781 – 816), also Duke of Gascony
- Seguin II Mostelanicus (840 – 846), also Duke of Gascony, also in Saintes
- William I (846 – 848), also Duke of Gascony
- Arnold (863 – 864)
- Amalvinus (c. 887 – c. 906)
- William II the Good (977 – 988)

Bordeaux inherited by William II of Gascony. Thereafter united to the duchy and acts as its capital even until Angevin times.
