= Seguin I of Gascony =

9th-century Frankish nobleman

Seguin I Lupo was Duke of Gascony from 812 until 816, when Louis the Pious deposed him "because of his boundless arrogance and wicked ways", according to the contemporary Frankish chroniclers. The "Basques across the Garonne and around the Pyrenees" rebelled against the removal of their duke, but the Frankish king received the submission of the rebels in Dax. The emperor crossed the Pyrenees and "settled matters" in Pamplona (according to the Vita Hludovici). This could imply that the Gascony of Seguin's day was trans-Pyrenean, i.e., comprised lands on both sides of the mountains.

A count of Bordeaux (ruler of the "Burdegalian country", or pagus Burdegalensis) appointed by Charlemagne in 778 had the same name, Seguin, and may have been the same person. The duke was probably of Gascon (Basque) lineage, though the Vita Hludovici calls him "of the race of Franks" (ex gente Francorum). After subduing the Basques and receiving the submission of the duke Lupus in 768–769, Charlemagne devised in 778 a territorial re-organization intending to undermine the native order of Vasconia (Gascony) and Lupus II's authority by (re-)establishing counties. Seguin was appointed count in Bordeaux, possibly from a rival family of duke Lupus II. He may have been a brother of Sancho I, Lupus III, and Garsand (or Garseand), and probably was the father of Seguin II. He was not, as has been alleged from time to time, the forefather of the Jiménez dynasty which ruled the kingdom of Navarre (905–1234).
