= Seguin II of Gascony =

Seguin II (died 846), called Mostelanicus, was the Count of Bordeaux and Saintes from 840 and Duke of Gascony from 845. He was either the son or grandson of Seguin I, the duke appointed by Charlemagne.

When Louis the Pious subdued Aquitaine and took it from his rebellious grandson Pepin II in 839, he began partitioning it into counties for those loyal to him. Seguin was one of the new counts. It was probably the emperor's intention to install a duke with local connections to offset the power of Sancho Sánchez, the local factional leader who opposed both Pepin and then Louis.

Seguin continued to support Louis until his death and then his successor in the west, Charles the Bald, but his fidelity to the latter wavered and he went over to the side of Pepin. He was rewarded with the title of dux Wasconum—Duke of Gascony—which probably referred to the Frankish march against the Gascons of Sancho. In Autumn 845, Seguin marched on the Vikings assaulting Bordeaux and Saintes but was captured and put to death.

== Bibliography ==
- Monlezun, Jean Justin. Histoire de la Gascogne. 1846.
- Higounet, Charles. Bordeaux pendant le haut moyen age. Bordeaux, 1963.
