= Bernard William of Gascony =

Sketch of an obol with the inscription +BENARDU +BURDIGA. Minted in Bernard's name at Bordeaux. On the obverse a human hand, on the reverse a cross.

Bernard William, (Note: Basque: Bernart Gilen, French: Bernard-Guillaume, Gascon: Bernat Guilhem, Latin: Bernardus Willielmus, Spanish: Bernardo Guillén) sometimes Bernard I (died 25 December 1009), was the Duke of Gascony (Note: There was no standardisation between the titles "Duke of Gascony" and "Count of Gascony" in Bernard's day.) and Count of Bordeaux from c.997 to his death. During his time, Gascony was effectively independent, its duke a sovereign and any connection to the Kingdom of France theoretical. His reign fell during a period of relative peace and prosperity: the Peace of God movement had originated in Gascony in his father's time, monastic reform was introduced during his reign and the period of Viking attacks was over. Nonetheless, it was also a period of increasing feudal fragmentation, and Bernard died a violent death.

Descended on both sides from dynasties of Basque origin, Bernard was the eldest son of Duke William Sánchez and Urraca, daughter of King García Sánchez I of Pamplona. "Bernard" was his given name and "William" a patronymic, being the name of his father. He used both names.

== Rule ==
The date of Duke William's death and Bernard's succession may be placed anywhere between 996 and 999. The early modern historian Pierre de Marca believed that Bernard was a minor and under a regency at the time of his accession, but this very unlikely. (Note: Marca was motivated in part to explain an unusual inscription reported by Arnauld de Oihenart on the wall of the church of Sainte-Quitterie d'Aire. This inscription may never have existed, and in any case is now lost. It recorded the burial in the church of one "William, count, margrave and duke of the Gascons", brother of García, count of Agen. Marca supposed that this William was an uncle and regent of Bernard.) Jean de Jaurgain reckons he was 23 or 24 years old, based on the lifespans of his father and brother.

Bernard's father had inherited the county of Bordeaux between 977 and 988 and begun minting coins there. Bernard continued to mint deniers and obols under his name and possibly under his patronymic as well. Of the several different types of obol minted under the name William, some were probably minted by Bernard. The hand on the obverse of some of Bernard's coins may represent a glove as used in a ceremony of investiture. A coin bearing his name was found in an 11th-century hoard of diverse coins in Piedmont. The hoard was probably assembled by a merchant or pilgrim who travelled throughout France and Gascony.

During Bernard's rule, the abbot Abbo of Fleury visited the monastery of La Réole with some of his monks to reform the monastery and establish the Benedictine rule. He is said to have remarked that he was more powerful in La Réole than the king of France (then Robert II), since nobody feared the power of the king. In fact, the Fleury mission was under the protection of Amalvi, viscount of Bézeaune. When Abbo was assassinated on 13 November 1004, according to the contemporary chronicler Adhemar of Chabannes, Bernard punished the assassins, "some he hanged, other he sent to the flames", and gave all the disputed monastic property and the monastic church of St Peter itself to the French monks from Fleury who had accompanied Abbo.

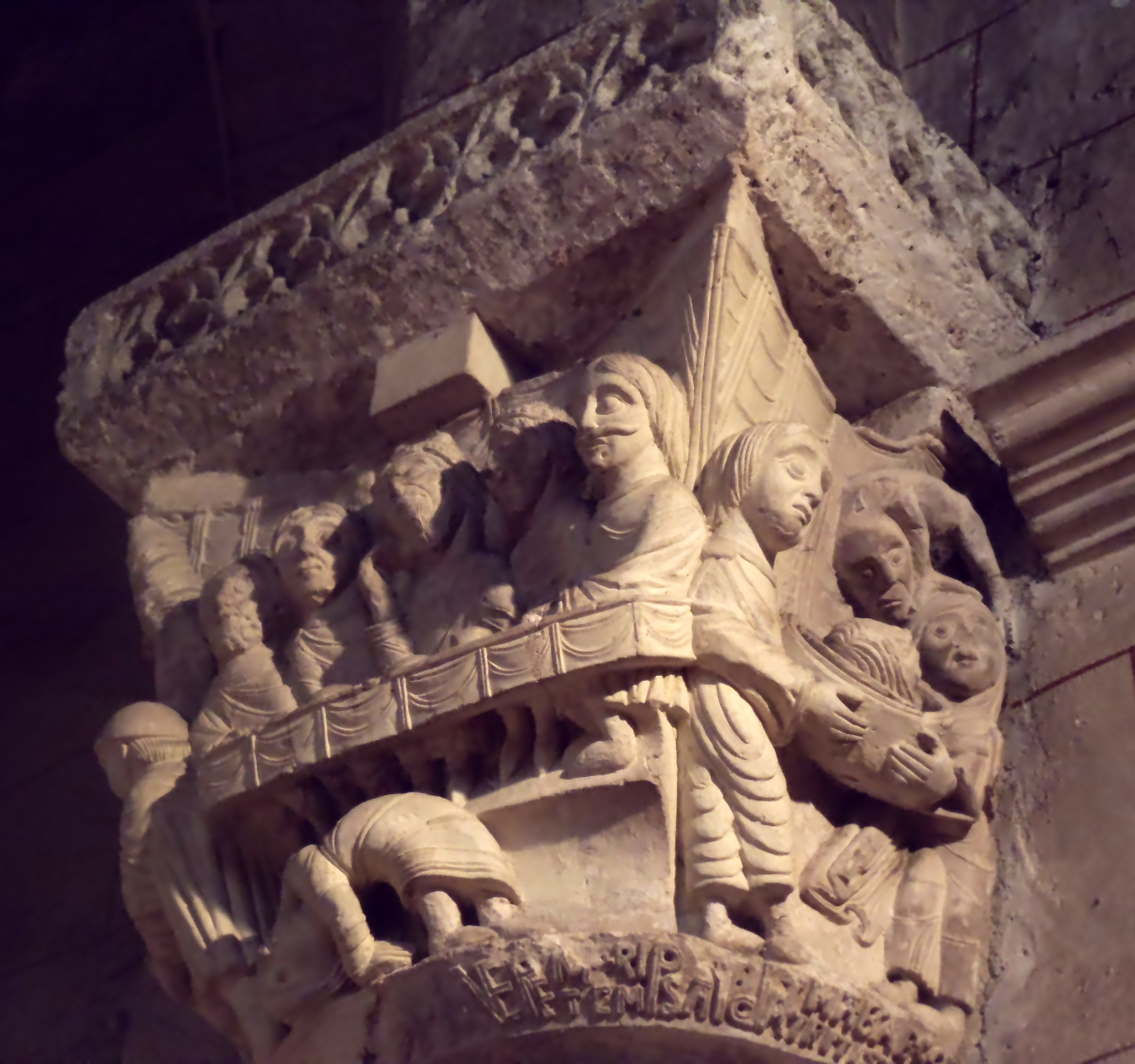
A carved capital from Saint-Sever, a monastery founded by Bernard's father and endowed and confirmed by Bernard.

Bernard's swift response to the murder of Abbo may have been designed to strengthen his authority in the territory of Viscount Amalvi and show who was the real protector of La Réole, for there is other evidence of challenges to Bernard's authority over the monasteries of Gascony. The ruling family of Montaner annexed the abbey of Saint-Orens de Larreule in 1009 and installed one of their own as abbot. By 1010, the head of the family Odon-Doat, had appropriated for himself the title of viscount.

On 3 April 1009, Bernard and his wife Urraca issued a charter of confirmation for the property of the abbey of Saint-Sever, founded by his father. By the time of this charter, Bernard's mother had also died.

== Death ==
Bernard's death is dated to 25 December 1009 by the necrology of the abbey of Saint-Sever. Since Bernard died without a male heir, his younger brother Sancho William succeeded him. A certain William Bernard, called de Laussianum, who got into a dispute with the abbey of Saint-Sever during the reign of Sancho William, may have been a natural son of Bernard. There are two non-overlapping accounts of Bernard's death.

According to Adhemar, Bernard was poisoned through "womanly plots". Probably he means to identify the killers as witches. Adhemar describes the poisoning of Count William II of Angoulême in 1028 in nearly identical terms.

According to a document in the "black" cartulary of the cathedral of Saint Mary of Auch, dating to about 1110, Bernard was assassinated by a knight named Raymond Paba. (Note: Ramundus, cognomento Paba, was one of the earliest owners of a motte castle in Gascony. The municipality of Lamothe in the Bazadais takes its name from this early motte. He was probably related to the numerous De La Mottes from the Bazadais in the 12th–14th centuries.) After the murder, Raymond sought refuge at the court of Aimeric I, count of Fezensac, who granted him the fief of Vic-Fezensac. (Note: In the charter of Auch, Raymond's great-grandson, Pierre de Vic, is restoring Vic-Fezensac to the diocese of Auch, from which the count of Fezensac had seized it.) This clearly implicates Aimeric in the murder. In response, Odo of Astarac, archbishop of Auch, excommunicated Raymond. As an act of penance, the latter went on a pilgrimage to Jerusalem, during which he died. Before he left, however, he received from Duke Sancho as a fief the castle of Buzet-sur-Baïse, which had been constructed by Sancho and Bernard's grandfather, Duke García Sánchez, to protect a now lost monastery.
