= William VI of Aquitaine =

Duke of Aquitaine and Count of Poitou from 1030 to 1038

William VI (1004 – March 1038), called the Fat, was Duke of Aquitaine and Count of Poitou between 1030 and his death. He was the eldest son of William V the Great by his first wife, Adalmode of Limoges.

== Conflict with his stepmother Agnes of Burgundy and life as a prisoner of war ==
Throughout his reign, he had to face the hostility of his stepmother, Agnes of Burgundy, the third wife of his father, who had remarried to Geoffrey Martel, then count of Vendôme. He entered into a war with Martel, who pretended to the government of the Saintonge. On 20 September 1034, he was captured in the field at Moncontour, near Saint-Jouin-de-Marnes.

He was freed in 1036, after nearly three years imprisonment, only by ceding the cities of Saintes and Bordeaux. He immediately reopened the war, but was defeated again and had to cede the isle of Oléron.

== Marriage and succession by his half-brother ==
William married Eustachie of Montreuil but had no known descendants. He reformed the administration of Poitiers by naming a provost, and died there, being succeeded by his half-brother Odo. He was buried at Maillezais.

== See also ==
- Dukes of Aquitaine family tree

== Sources ==
- Bachrach, Bernard S. (1993). Fulk Nerra, the Neo-Roman Consul, 987-1040. University of California Press.

Preceded by William V	Duke of Aquitaine; 1030–1038	Succeeded by Odo
Preceded by William V	Count of Poitiers; 1030–1038	Succeeded by Odo
