= Sancho IV Garcés of Gascony =

Duke of Gascony

Sancho IV Garcés (Basque: Antzo Gartzia, Gascon: Sans Gassia, French: Sanche; died 950 or 955) was the duke of Gascony from 930 until his death. During his tenure, Gascony shrank considerably as his brothers inherited important regions and the de facto and perhaps de jure independent duchy slipped into historical near-oblivion.

He is mentioned in the cartulary of Auch, as a son of García Sánchez, and the Códice de Roda, which mentions him as the heir of Gascony. On his father's death, he inherited the duchy itself, which included the viscounties of Lomagen, Gavarret, Tursan, and Bruillois. His younger brothers, William and Arnold, inherited Fézensac (including Armagnac) and Astarac respectively with the comital title. Thus was Gascony divided and diminished.

In 932, Flodoard records that the brothers Ermengol of Rouergue and Raymond Pons of Toulouse, Princes of Gothia, brought a "Lupus Aznar Vasco" with them to do homage to Rudolph of France. Lewis considers this "Vasco" to be the duke of Gascony and calls him "Sánchez." The duke meant, however, would be Sancho.

Sancho had two illegitimate sons, Sancho, who later succeeded him, and William, who likewise succeeded his childless brother. A third son was Gombald, a noted pluralist bishop, who held the various sees of Gascony as one until being reappointed to the long-vacant archdiocese of Bordeaux. A fourth son Udalrich or Odulric is attested in charters; probably all were bastards.

== Sources ==
- Lewis, Archibald R. The Development of Southern French and Catalan Society, 718–1050. University of Texas Press: Austin, 1965.
- Monlezun, Jean Justin. Histoire de la Gascogne. 1846.
- Collins, Roger. The Basques. Blackwell Publishing: London, 1990.
