= Sancho V Sánchez of Gascony =

Sancho V Sánchez

Duke of Gascony
- Reign: 950/55–961
- Predecessor: Sancho IV Garcés
- Successor: William II Sánchez
- Born: c.925
- Died: 961 (aged 35–36) (approximately)
- Dynasty: Gascon dynasty
- Father: Sancho IV Garcés of Gascony

Sancho V Sánchez (Basque: Antso Sancion, Gascon: Sans Sancion French: Sanche Sancion; died circa 961) was briefly Duke of Gascony from the death of his father, Sancho IV, between 950 and 955 to his own death. He was an illegitimate son whose rule did not last long before he died heirless to be succeeded by his brother William Sancho.

There is some disagreement as to the name of this successor of Sancho IV. Some sources give two sons, an eldest named García and a younger named Sancho, placing the death of the latter before the succession of William and making García their father's heir. It is probably just a mixup in names: the son who succeeded Sancho IV was named either García or Sancho.

== Sources ==
- Sedycias, João. História da Língua Espanhola.
- Monlezun, Jean Justin. Histoire de la Gascogne. 1846.
- Collins, Roger. The Basques. Blackwell Publishing: London, 1990.
