= Flag of Gascony =

Region of Gascony, located in France

- Lo Sautèr (the Saltire), Union Gascona (Gascon Union)
- Use: Civil
- Proportion: 3:5
- Adopted: 12th century (1188?)
- Design: A red field with a white diagonal cross that extends to the corners of the flag. In Blazon, Gules, a saltire Argent.

Current communes and departments included in the ancient Province of Gascony

Coat of arms of Gascony

The Flag of Gascony represents the region of Gascony, France. The legend says that the flag appeared under Pope Clement III (1187–1191) to gather the Gascons during the Third Crusade (12th century), but no proof of that statement has yet been found. The Chronica of Rogeri de Houedene, often taken as a proof for the creation of the flag, mentions only the crosses taken by the crusaders of three nations: the French (a red cross), the English (a white cross) and the Flemish (a green cross).

That flag contains the St Andrew's Cross, from the patron saint of Bordeaux, and the red colour of the Kingdom of England, which ruled over Gascony from the 12th to the mid-15th centuries.

After the end of the Hundred Years' War (1337–1453), the flag went out of use and was never replaced.

A modern blazon (blue and red with sheaf of wheat and lion) was created in Versailles by the judge of weapons' cabinet (chief of protocol) of French king Louis XIV in 1697–1709 for symbolically adding the province to the French royal coat of arms.

== The Saltire, lo Sautèr ==
Gascony has not had any institutional unity since the 11th century and so several flag versions are currently used on the territory.

The Saltire, sometimes called "Union Gascona" (Gascon Union) is a white Saint Andrew's cross on a red background. Some say that it was originally given by Pope Clement III during the Third Crusade, but no evidence of that assumption has been found.

It is often said that the text of the chronicler Roger of Howden mentioned that Pope Clement III gave crosses to the kings of France and England (Richard I of England as well as the duke of Aquitania and Gascony) during the Gisors Conference in 1188 and that those kings then assigned flags, with the cross on it, to their respective nations. The following text ("The French flags" on the website Heraldica, accessed 04-22-2010) is about this event: The kings of France and England were in a peace conference in a field between Gisors and Trie, in January 1188, when the archbishop of Tyre arrived with the news of the conquest of Jerusalem by Saladdin, and an urgent plea for a new crusade. The event is told by the contemporary chronicler Roger de Hoveden (R. de Houedene, Chronica, ed. William Stubbs, vol. 2, London, 1869, p. 335). At this conference came the archbishop of Tyre, who [...] moved their hearts to taking the cross. And those who were enemies before, by his predication and God’s help, became friends that day, and received the cross from his hand; and in that moment the sign of the cross appeared above them in the sky. On seeing that miracle, many rushed in droves to take the cross. And said kings, when taking the cross, chose a visible sign for themselves and their people to identify their nation. The king of France and his people took red crosses; the king of England with his people took white crosses; and Philip count of Flanders with his people took green crosses; and thus everyone returned home to provide for the needs of his journey. [… ad cognoscendam gentem suam signum evidens sibi et suis providerunt, ... et sic unusquisque ...]

The original text of Howden stops here. What comes next is an addition from F. Velde: "It is often said that the system was extended to other regions or nations : Brittany’s cross was black, Lorraine green, Italy and Sweden yellow, Burgundy a red Saint Andrew’s, Gascony a white Saint Andrew’s."

Thus, it cannot be confirmed that the Gascon saltire comes from the Crusades or even the Middle Ages. At least, it was known while F. Velde wrote the article. As Saint Andrew is the patron of Bordeaux, that could be a hint for its origin.

In Volume 14 of the Grande Encyclopédie, published in France between 1886 and 1902 by Henri Lamirault, one can read that

aux temps difficiles de la guerre de Cent ans et des luttes terribles entre les Armagnacs représentant le parti national (croix blanche) et les Bourguignons alliés des Anglais (croix rouge et croix rouge de Saint-André), le drapeau des Anglais victorieux finit par réunir, en 1422, sous Henri VI, sur son champ les croix blanche et rouge de France et d'Angleterre, les croix de Saint-André, blanche et rouge de Guyenne et de Bourgogne.

During the hard times of the Hundred Years' War and the terrible struggles between the Armagnacs, representing the national party (white cross) and the Burgundians, allied to the English (red cross and red Saint-Andrews' cross), the flag of the victorious English ends up gathering, in 1422, under Henri VI, on its field the white and red crosses of France and England, the white and red Saint-Andrew's crosses of Guyenne and Burgundy.

On the website Gasconha.com, a message from M. Fourment (12-15-2006) returns to the website svowebmaster.free.fr on which would be written that the Saltire was declared "official flag of Gascony" on 13 January in 1903 but without any other details or the source (perhaps was it in the context of the Félibrige that was then developing).

The red and white colors are statistically dominants in the heraldry of the Gascon countries. The red-and-white flag, or Saltire, lo(u) Sautèr, is considered as being the flag of the Gascon people.

Therefore, this Gascon saltire may have picked up some ancient traditions. Even if it was dated from the late 19th century to the early 20th, it follows the rules of vexillology (simplicity, distant readability). It corresponds to the colour and the pattern of the talenquères in many bullrings in Gascony.

== The Quarterly ==
'l'Esquarterat' (Esquarterat)

However, another flag is used: the Quarterly. It corresponds to the arms of the ancient Province of Gascony put in a banner.

The province was smaller than the current Gascony (also called "cultural and linguistic Gascony) since it included neither the Béarn nor the Gascon part of the Guyenne but included the Basque provinces of the Labourd and the Soule.

== Dame Flag ==
'Drapeau à la Dame' (Dame Flag)

The Gascon cultural flag was proposed for promoting the whole of Gascon culture. Red and white are the cultural colours of Gascony. The triangular shape and a young symbol representing Gascony, often described as a triangle bordering the Garonne, the Pyrenees and the Atlantic Ocean. The head in the middle is none other than the statue of the Venus of Brassempouy. Found in the Landes de Gascogne, it dates back 25,000 years and is the oldest known human face today. It does not even measure 4 cm, carved in mammoth ivory with stone. This flag has not gained much popularity but is sometimes used.
