= Bernhard I of Lippe =

Bernhard I (c. 1090 – c. 1158) was the first Lord of Lippe in what is now part of Germany. He ruled Lippe from 1123 to 1158.
