= Arnold of Gascony =

Arnold (also Arnaut or Arnaud) (died 864) was the Count of Fézensac and briefly Duke of Gascony in 864. He was the son of Emenon, Count of Périgord, and Sancha, daughter of Sancho Sánchez of Gascony. He made his claim on Gascony on his uncle's death.

In 863, King Charles the Bald nominated him Count of Angoulême and Bordeaux. The next year he became duke defending the Gascon frontier, but he died fighting the Norsemen within months.

== Sources ==
- Higounet, Charles. Bordeaux pendant le haut moyen age. Bordeaux, 1963.
- Lewis, Archibald R. The Development of Southern French and Catalan Society, 718–1050. University of Texas Press: Austin, 1965.
