= García II Sánchez of Gascony =

9th-century Gascon nobleman

García II Sánchez (Basque: Gartzia Antso, French: Garsie-Sanche le Tors or le Courbé, Gascon: Gassia Sans, Latin: Garsia Sancius Corvum; died c. 930), called the Bent, was Duke of Gascony from sometime before 887 to his death.

He was probably a son of Sancho Sánchez or of Sancho Mitarra, though older sources give a genealogy with a Spanish origin.

His ancestry is, in the end, unknown. He may have been a cousin of Arnold, who some sources claim acted as regent during his minority following his father’s death in 864 (if his father was Sánchez). Other sources place Arnold as Sancho’s successor and date his death to that same year. Whatever the case, García was in power by 887.

In that year, he appeared in a charter issued by the grandees of Aquitaine assembled at Bourges to decide on a course of action in the twilight of the reign of Charles the Fat. In 904, he was using the title comes et marchio in limitibus oceani: "count and margrave to the limits of the ocean." García was the first of a line of dukes which ruled Gascony until 1032 and incorporated the County of Bordeaux into its demesne. García’s daughter Andregoto married one Raymond, who fathered William the Good, Count of Bordeaux. García divided his domain between his three sons by Amuna:

- Sancho IV inherited a rump duchy of Gascony with the ducal title
- William inherited the county of Fézensac (including Armagnac)
- Arnold inherited the county of Astarac
- Andregoto, mother of William the Good, Count of Bordeaux
- Garsinda, married Raymond III Pons, Count of Toulouse
- Acibella, married Galindo II Aznárez, Count of Aragon

== Sources ==
- Higounet, Charles. Bordeaux pendant le haut moyen age. Bordeaux, 1963.
