= García I Jiménez of Gascony =

García Jiménez (Basque: Gartzia Semeno, Gascon: Gassia Semen, French: Garsias and Garsie Siguin) was the Duke of Gascony as leader of the Gascons from 816 to his death in 818. He succeeded Seguin I, who was deposed by Louis the Pious in 816 and García was elected to replace him.
