= Lupus III Centule of Gascony =

Lupo III Centule (Basque: Otsoa Wasco, French: Loup Centulle, Gascon: Lop Centullo, Latin: Lupus Centullus, Spanish: Lope or Lobo Centulo, Catalan: Llop Centoll) (died ca. 820) was the Duke of Gascony briefly from 818 until his deposition by Pepin I of Aquitaine in 819. He was either a son of García I or of Centule, a brother of Sancho I.

Lupo was a Gascon rebel against the authority of Pepin in Aquitaine. In 818, the death of García left a power vacuum in Gascony which Lupo attempted to fill. Pepin responded quickly, however, and entered Gascony, emanating a diploma at Castillon-sur-Dordogne the next year. He formally deposed Lupo and sent Berengar of Toulouse and Guerin of Auvergne into the region to dislodge him from power. He was replaced by Aznar Sánchez, who assumed power in Aragon as well.

== Sources ==
- Higounet, Charles. Bordeaux pendant le haut moyen age. Bordeaux, 1963.
- Lewis, Archibald R. The Development of Southern French and Catalan Society, 718–1050. University of Texas Press: Austin, 1965.
- Zurita, Gerónimo. Anales de la Corona de Aragón I. Edited by Antonio Ubieto Arteta and Desamparados Pérez Soler. Valencia: 1967.
