= William V of Aquitaine =

Duke of Aquitaine and Count of Poitou from 990 to 1030

William V

Duke of Aquitaine
- Reign: 990 − 31 January 1030
- Predecessor: William IV
- Successor: William VI
- Born: 969; Poitiers
- Died: 31 January 1030; Maillezais Cathedral
- Burial: Maillezais Cathedral
- Spouse: Adalemode of Limoges; Brisque of Gascony; Agnes of Burgundy
- Issue: William VI, Duke of Aquitaine; Odo of Gascony; William VII, Duke of Aquitaine; William VIII, Duke of Aquitaine; Agnes of Poitou
- House: Ramnulfids
- Father: William IV, Duke of Aquitaine
- Mother: Emma of Blois

William the Great (French: Guillaume le Grand; 969 – 31 January 1030) was duke of Aquitaine (as William V) and count of Poitou from 990 until his death. Upon the death of the emperor Henry II, he was offered the kingdom of Italy but declined to contest the title against Conrad II.

== Life ==
William was the son and successor of William IV by his wife Emma of Blois, daughter of Theobald I of Blois. He seems to have taken after his formidable mother, who ruled Aquitaine as regent until 1004. He was a friend to Bishop Fulbert of Chartres, who found in him another Maecenas, and founded a cathedral school at Poitiers. He himself was very well educated, a collector of books, and turned the prosperous court of Aquitaine into the learning centre of Southern France.

Though a cultivated prince, William was a failure in the field. He called upon his suzerain Robert II of France to aid in subduing his vassal, Boso of La Marche. Initially unsuccessful, Boso was eventually chased from the duchy. He had to contain Vikings who continually threatened his coast. In 1006, he was defeated by Viking invaders. He lost the Loudunais and Mirebalais to Fulk Nerra, count of Anjou. He had to give up Confolens, Ruffec, and Chabanais to compensate William II of Angoulême, but Fulbert negotiated a treaty (1020) outlining the reciprocal obligations of vassal and suzerain.

However, William's court was a centre of artistic endeavour and he its surest patron. His piety and culture brought peace to his vast territories, and he tried to stem the tide of feudal warfare then destroying the unity of many European nations by supporting the current Peace and Truce of God movements initiated by Pope and Church. He founded Maillezais Abbey (1010) and Bourgueil Abbey. After a fire in Poitier, he rebuilt the cathedral and many other religious structures. He travelled widely in Europe, annually visiting Rome or Spain as a pilgrim. Everywhere he was greeted with royal pomp. His court was of an international flavour, receiving ambassadors from the Emperor Henry II, Alfonso V of León, Canute the Great, and even his suzerain, Robert of France.

Upon the death of Henry II without an obvious heir, some of the nobles of the kingdom of Italy looked for a separate candidate to elect rather than maintain their union with Germany by accepting its election of Conrad II. An embassy led by Ulric Manfred, the marquis of Susa, came to France in 1024 and remained for a year, attempting to interest Robert's son Hugh Magnus and then (after Robert's refusal to permit this) William, whose character and court impressed many. William considered the proposal seriously but, upon visiting Italy himself, he found the political situation so unfavorable that he renounced the crown for himself and his heirs. Most of his surviving six letters deal with the Italian proposal.

William's reign ended in peace and he died on the last (or second to last) day of January 1030 at Maillezais Abbey, which he founded and where he is buried.

The principal source of information on William's reign is the panegyric of Adhemar of Chabannes. His relations with his vassal, Hugh IV of Lusignan, are the subject of the Conventum.

== Family ==
William was married at least 3 times. His first wife was Adalemode of Limoges, widow of Adalbert I of La Marche. They had:

1. William VI, his successor

William's second wife was Brisque(or Brisca) of Gascony, daughter of Duke William Sánchez of Gascony and sister of Duke Sancho VI William. She was dead by 1018. They had:

1. Odo, later duke of Gascony

William's third wife was Agnes of Burgundy, daughter of Otto-William, Duke of Burgundy. Her second husband was Geoffrey II of Anjou. They had:

1. Peter William, later duke as William VII
2. Guy Geoffrey, later duke as William VIII
3. Agnes (or Ala), married Henry III, Holy Roman Emperor (1043)

== See also ==
- Dukes of Aquitaine family tree

== Sources ==
- Bachrach, Bernard S. (1993). Fulk Nerra, the Neo-Roman Consul, 987-1040. University of California Press.
- Nouvelle Biographie Générale. Paris, 1859.
- Owen, D. D. R. Eleanor of Aquitaine: Queen and Legend.

William V of Aquitaine House of Poitiers Born: 969 Died: 31 January 1030
Preceded by William IV	Duke of Aquitaine; 990–1030	Succeeded by William VI
Preceded by William IV	Count of Poitiers; 990–1030	Succeeded by William VI
