= Vita Hludovici =

Astronomus, the Astronomer

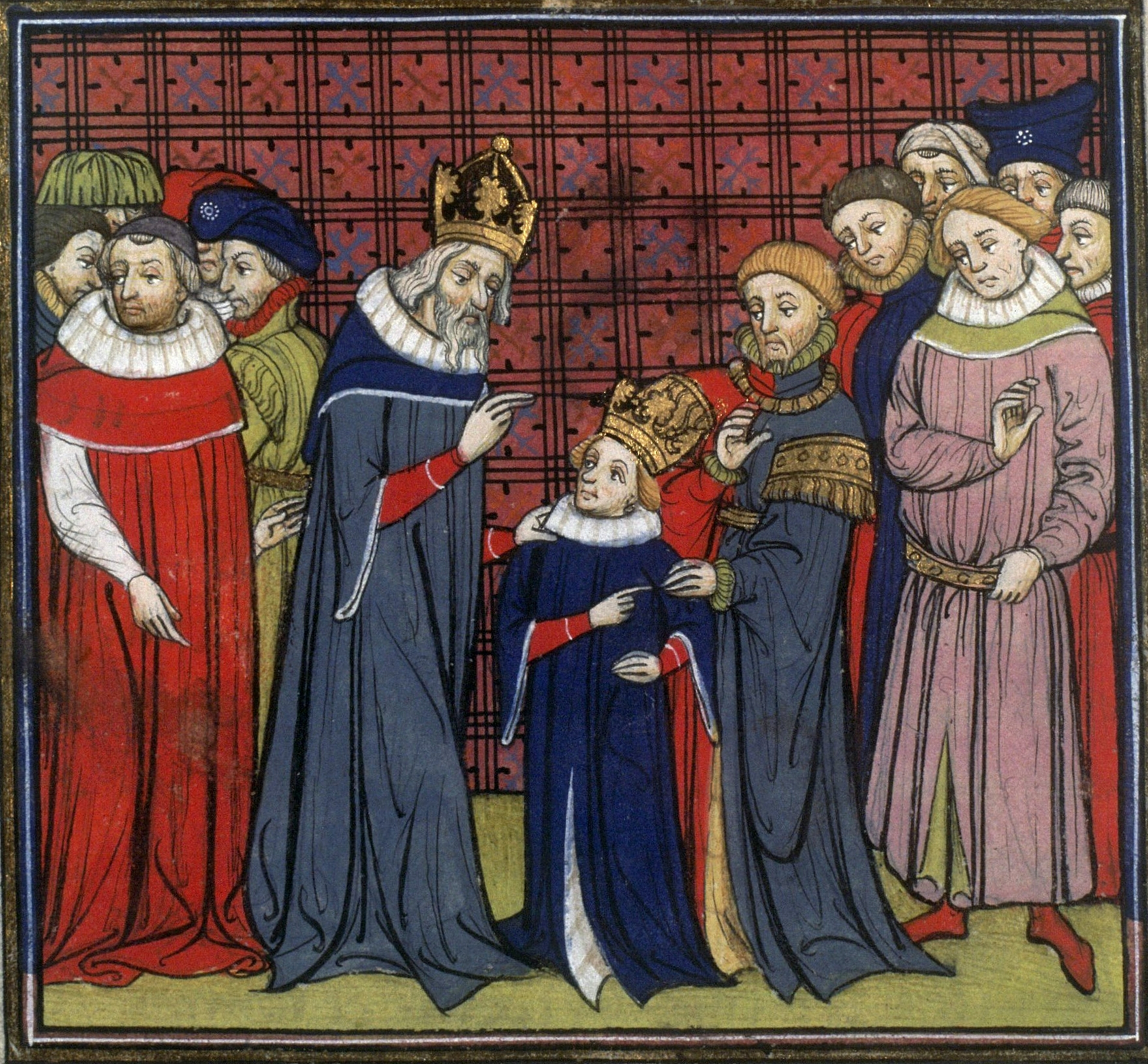
Charlemagne crowns Louis the Pious.

Vita Hludovici or Vita Hludovici Imperatoris (The Life of Louis or the Life of the Emperor Louis) is an anonymous biography of Louis the Pious, Holy Roman Emperor and King of the Franks from AD 814 to 840.

== Author ==
The work was written in Latin in or soon after AD 840 by an anonymous author who is conventionally called Astronomus, the Astronomer or sometimes the Limousin Astronomer. This is due to his many detailed comments on astronomical matters in the work upon which he describes himself as "one credited with having knowledge of this subject." He held office at the court of Louis the Pious, and his cultural and religious references suggest that he was not a churchman. It has been conjectured, based on evidence within the text, that the author was born around AD 800 and that his nationality was not Gothic or Frankish.

The author's attitude to his subject is clearly subordinate and one of admiration, yet he does not idealise Louis in the same way as, for example, Einhard does in his Life of Charlemagne. It has been suggested that the author exhibits a degree of disapproval towards clerics and the workings of the Frankish Church, lending weight to the view that he was not formally connected to the Church. Nevertheless, the most popular recent ideas (see below) do identify him as a cleric.

=== Identification ===
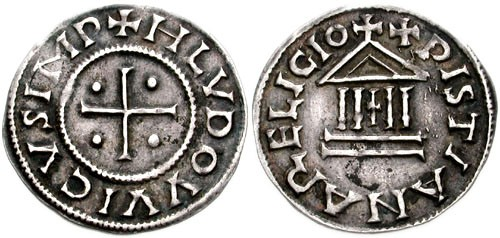
Denier of Louis (20mm, 1.65 g, 1h). Uncertain mint. Struck 822–840 AD. Obverse: HLVDOVVICVS IMP, cross; pellet in each quarter. Reverse: XPISTIANA RELIGIO, temple; cross within.

Various attempts have been made to identify the author with a particular individual. In 1729, Von Eckhart thought he was a notary attached to Louis' court between 816 and 839. Von Simson in 1909 attempted to identify him as Archdeacon Gerolt, a cleric at court. Max Buchner, the author of one of the most influential modern studies of the Astronomer's work in 1940, identified him as Hilduin, the chancellor of Pippin II of Aquitaine and Charles the Bald.

Ernst Tremp supports this view in his important 1995 study, although Buchner and Tremp differ by about a decade in their dating of the work.

Tischler has most recently tried to make a case that the Astronomer was Jonas of Orleans but the Hilduin theory remains more popular amongst historians. Recently, Courtney Booker suggested Walafrid Strabo was the Astronomer.

== See also ==
- Gesta Hludowici Imperatoris by Thegan of Trier

== Bibliography ==
- Booker, Courtney M. (2009). Past Convictions: The Penance of Louis the Pious and the Decline of the Carolingians. Philadelphia: University of Pennsylvania Press.
- Buchner, Max (1940). "Entstehungszeit und Verfasser der "Vita Hludowici" des "Astronomus"". Historisches Jahrbuch (in German). 60: 14–45.
- Cabaniss, Allen (1961). Son of Charlemagne. A Contemporary Life of Louis the Pious. Syracuse: Syracuse University Press.
- King, Paul David, ed. (1987). Charlemagne: Translated Sources. Lambrigg, Kendal: King.
- Pertz, Georgius Heinricus, ed. (1829). "Vita Hludowici imperatoris". Monumenta Germaniae Historica: Scriptores. Vol. 2. Hannoverae: Impensis Bibliopolii Aulici Hahniani. pp. 604–648.
- Rau, Reinhold, ed. (1955). Quellen zur Karolingischen Reichsgeschichte, I: Die Reichsannalen, Einhard Leben Karls es Grossen, Zwei „Leben“ Ludwigs, Nithard Geschichte. Darmstadt: Wissenschaftliche Buchgesellschaft.
- Tischler, Matthias Martin (2001). Einharts Vita Karoli: Studien zur Entstehung, Überlieferung und Rezeption (in German). Hanover: Hahnsche Buchhandlung. ISBN 978-3-7752-5448-9.
- Tremp, Ernst, ed. (1995). Thegan: Die Taten Kaiser Ludwigs - Astronomus: Das Leben Kaiser Ludwigs (in German). Hannover: Hahnsche Buchhandlung.
