= Sancho II Sánchez of Gascony =

Sancho II Sánchez or Sans II Sancion (died sometime between 854 and 864) succeeded his brother Aznar Sánchez as count of Vasconia Citerior (Gascony) in 836, in spite of the objections of King Pepin I of Aquitaine.

After Pepin's death in 838, confusion enveloped southern Gaul. Most Aquitainian counts elected Pepin II as their king, but Emperor Louis the Pious, urged by his wife Judith, redivided his vast realm at Worms in May 839, granting all of Aquitaine, Gascony, Septimania, and the Hispanic March to his youngest son, Charles the Bald. Louis sent an imperial army into the Limousin and then installed his son at Poitiers. The partisans of Pepin were defeated and Louis proceeded to appoint new counts in new districts. One Seguin was appointed in Bordeaux to counter Sancho, now acting virtually alone.

Seguin was appointed dux Wasconum by Louis the Pious—that is, duke of the march guarding the frontier with the Gascons, led by Sancho, most probably a Basque himself. Seguin was killed later that year in a battle against the Vikings. In 848, Bordeaux was left without a leader after the withdrawal of the Vikings. It is not known for sure if Sancho took possession of the city, but it is certainly possible. Historian Ferdinand Lot supposed that Sancho was even nominated as duke at Limoges or Orléans by Charles the Bald in that year. He certainly submitted by 850. With his brother-in-law Emenon, Count of Périgord, the husband of his sister Sancha, Sancho was captured by the dissident Moorish chieftain Musa. Charles negotiated their release and in turn Sancho handed over Pepin II when the latter took refuge in Gascony in September 852.

In or before 864, Sancho died and the duchy of Gascony passed to his nephew Arnold, son of Emenon. The later duke García Sánchez may have been his son.

== Sources ==
=== Primary ===
- Pertz, G, ed. Chronici Fontanellensis fragmentum in Mon. Ger. Hist. Scriptores, Vol. II.
- Pertz, G, ed. Chronicum Aquitanicum in Mon. Ger. Hist. Scriptores, Vol. II.
- Waitz, E, ed. Annales Bertiniani. Hanover: 1883.

=== Secondary ===
- Higounet, Charles. Bordeaux pendant le haut moyen age. Bordeaux, 1963.
- Lewis, Archibald R. The Development of Southern French and Catalan Society, 718–1050. University of Texas Press: Austin, 1965.
