= Sancho VI William of Gascony =

Sancho VI William

Duke of Gascony Count of Bordeaux
- Reign: 25 December 1009–4 October 1032
- Predecessor: Bernard I William
- Successor: Eudes
- Born: c.975
- Died: 4 October 1032 (aged 56–57) (approximately); Saint-Sever
- Burial: Lescar
- Consort: Urraca of Castile
- Issue: Alasia
- Dynasty: Gascon dynasty
- Father: William II Sánchez of Gascony
- Mother: Urraca Garcés of Pamplona

Sancho VI William (Basque: Antso Gilen, French: Sanche Guillaume, Gascon: Sans Guilhem, Spanish: Sancho Guillén) (died 4 October 1032) was the Duke of Gascony from 1009 to his death. His reign is most notable for the renewal of Gascons ties with Spain.

Sancho was a son of William II Sánchez and Urraca of Navarre and relative of Sancho III of Navarre and he spent a portion of his life at the court of that king in Pamplona. He also took part in the Reconquista. It is possible he even submitted Gascony to the suzerainty of Navarre. In 1010, he appeared together with Sancho, Robert II of France, and William V of Aquitaine at Saint-Jean d'Angély. He certainly never paid homage to the king of France.

In 1027, he met William V at Blaye and they jointly selected Geoffrey, a Frank, as Archbishop of Bordeaux, which had become the Gascon capital during Sancho's reign. He had given his sister Brisca in marriage to the widower duke William and when he died without successors in 1032, the Aquitainian duke's children by this second marriage inherited Gascony.

== Sources ==
- Higounet, Charles. Bordeaux pendant le haut moyen age. Bordeaux, 1963.
- Lewis, Archibald R. The Development of Southern French and Catalan Society, 718–1050. University of Texas Press: Austin, 1965.
- Zurita, Gerónimo. Anales de la Corona de Aragón I. Edited by Antonio Ubieto Arteta and Desamparados Pérez Soler. Valencia: 1967.
