= Pepin II of Aquitaine =

King of Aquitaine from 838 to 864

Pepin II
- King of the Franks of Aquitaine
- Denier struck in the name of Pepin II, issued around 845–848 and minted in Toulouse.

King of Aquitaine
- Reign: 845–851/852 or 864
- Predecessor: Charles II the Bald
- Successor: Charles the Child
- Born: c. 823
- Died: after june 864; Senlis, Western Francia
- House: Carolingian
- Father: Pepin I of Aquitaine
- Mother: Ingeltrude or Ringarde
- Religion: Christianity; Germanic paganism

Pepin II, called the Younger (823 – after 864 in Senlis), was King of Aquitaine from 838 as the successor upon the death of his father, Pepin I. Pepin II was eldest son of Pepin I and Ingeltrude, daughter of Theodobert, count of Madrie. He was a grandson of the Emperor Louis the Pious.

== Life ==
Pepin was elected king upon his father's death by the nobles of Aquitaine who were keen to establish their independence from the Empire. However, his grandfather Louis the Pious had appointed his son Charles the Bald, Pepin's uncle who was about the same age, as King of Aquitaine in 832 when he (nominally) dispossessed Pepin's father Pepin I, and eventually contested the kingship on Pepin I's death in 838. Pepin had thereafter been at war with his half-uncle Charles. Louis the Pious fully disinherited him at Crémieu and then at Worms in two subsequent divisions of the empire.

Louis demanded the Aquitainians send Pepin to Aachen to learn the ways of good governance, which they refused. Pepin was in total control of Aquitaine until 841 when he went to his uncle Lothair I's aid at the Battle of Fontenoy. Pepin defeated Charles the Bald, but Lothair was routed by Louis the German, another son of Emperor Louis. Pepin returned to Aquitaine and continued war with Charles the Bald.

In 844 Pepin made the fatal error of asking for help from Jarl Oscar, a Viking adventurer. He guided Oscar's forces up the Garonne to Toulouse, giving them an opportunity to scout the land for plundering. In 845 Pepin welcomed Seguin of Bordeaux who had defected from the Emperor's side. Pepin made him dux Wasconum, to help his fight against Sans II Sancion of Gascony, who had been at war with his father Pepin I.

Bordeaux, the largest city in Aquitaine and then controlled by Charles, was seized by Oscar in 847, with the aid of disaffected citizens. These were either Jews or partisans of Pepin. The loss of this city to a heathen pirate, coupled with Pepin's heavy drinking and loose living, eroded his support in the nobility until 848 he was left with no support. His younger brother, Charles then tried to claim the Aquitainian Kingdom for himself.

Pepin II's rule finally ended in 851 or 852 when he was captured by Sans II Sancion, and handed over to Charles. He was detained in the monastery of Saint Médard in Soissons. As reward Sans was awarded the status of Duke.

Louis the German, who was at war with Charles the Bald, sent his son Louis the Younger, to claim Aquitaine. He marched as far as Limoges in 855 before returning east.

Pepin escaped the monastery in Soissons and, with the help of some of the aristocracy, recovered some of his old authority and lands in 854. The Vikings now established in the Loire Valley ravaged Poitiers, Angoulême, Périgueux, Limoges, Clermont, and Bourges while Charles the Bald was busy trying to subdue Pepin. In 864 Pepin joined the Vikings and is rumoured to have turned from Christianity to worship Woden and "lived like one of them [the Vikings]". (Note: Mentions Pepin's Viking alliance without reference to paganism.) He joined the Vikings in an attack on Toulouse. He was captured again later in 864, deposed by the Edict of Pîtres, and imprisoned in Senlis. Following his condemnation he was executed on charges of apostasy and treason.

== Sources ==
- Bradbury, Jim (2004). "Pepin II of Aquitaine". The Routledge Companion to Medieval Warfare. Routledge. ISBN 978-0-203-64466-9.
- Forte, Angelo; Oram, Richard; Pedersen, Frederik (2005). Viking Empires. Cambridge: Cambridge University Press. p. 61. ISBN 9780521829922.
- Lewis, Archibald Ross (1965). The Development of Southern French and Catalan Society, 718–1050. University of Texas Press.
- Peters, Edward (1970). The Shadow King: Rex inutilis in Medieval Law and Literature, 751–1327. Yale University Press.
- Riche, Pierre (1993). The Carolingians : A Family who forged Europe. Translated by Allen, Michael Idomir. University of Pennsylvania Press.

Pepin II of Aquitaine Carolingian dynasty Born: 823 Died: after 864
Preceded by Pepin I	King of Aquitaine; 838–864 with Charles the Bald and Charles the Child as contenders	Succeeded by Charles the Child
