= Roger Collins =

English medievalist (born 1949)

Roger J. H. Collins (born 2 September 1949) is an English medievalist, currently an honorary fellow in history at the University of Edinburgh.

Collins studied at the University of Oxford (Queen's and Saint Cross Colleges) under Peter Brown and John Michael Wallace-Hadrill. He then taught ancient and medieval history at the universities of Liverpool and Bristol. He arrived at the University of Edinburgh in 1994 and joined the Institute of Advanced Studies in the Humanities before becoming an honorary fellow in the Department of History (now the School of History, Classics and Archaeology) in 1998.

Collins's research has primarily concerned the Early Middle Ages, with an emphasis on Spain, but also the Franks. His studies on the Basques and the Papacy (ongoing) have extended beyond this medieval period into the modern. His most recent publication is a book on the seventh- and eighth-century versions of the Chronicle of Fredegar for the Monumenta Germaniae Historica.

== Select bibliography ==
The following is a select list of Collins's writings. Only first printings and English versions are noted, as well as the latest revisions.

- Early Medieval Spain: Unity in Diversity, 400–1000 (London: Macmillans, 1983, 2nd ed. 1995)
- The Basques (Oxford: Blackwell, 1986, 2nd ed. 1990)
- The Arab Conquest of Spain, 710–797 (Oxford: Blackwell, 1989, 2nd ed. 1994)
- Early Medieval Europe, 300–1000 (London: Macmillans, 1991, 2nd ed. 1999, 3rd ed. 2010)
- Law, Culture and Regionalism in Early Medieval Spain (Aldershot: Variorum, 1992)
- (with Judith McClure) Bede's Ecclesiastical History: Introduction and notes, together with translations of Bede's Letter to Egbert and his Greater Chronicle (Oxford: Oxford University Press World's Classics, 1994, 2nd ed. 1996)
- Fredegar (Aldershot: Variorum, 1996)
- Oxford Archaeological Guide to Spain (Oxford: Oxford University Press, 1998)
- Charlemagne (London: Macmillans, 1998)
- Visigothic Spain, 409–711 (Oxford: Blackwell, 2004)
- (edited with Patrick Wormald and Donald Bullough) Ideal and Reality in Frankish and Anglo-Saxon Society: Studies presented to Professor J. M. Wallace-Hadrill (Oxford: Blackwell, 1983)
- (edited with Peter Goldman) Charlemagne's Heir: New Approaches to the Reign of Louis the Pious (Oxford: Oxford University Press, 1990)
- (edited with Anthony Goodman) Medieval Spain: Culture, Conflict and Coexistence (Basingstoke and New York: Palgrave-Macmillan, 2002)
- Keepers of the Keys of Heaven: A History of the Papacy (New York: Basic Books 2009)
- Caliphs and Kings: Spain, 796–1031 (A History of Spain) (UK: Wiley-Blackwell, 2012)
