= Gascony =

Former province in southwestern France (1453–1789)

Coordinates: 44.0°N 0.5°W

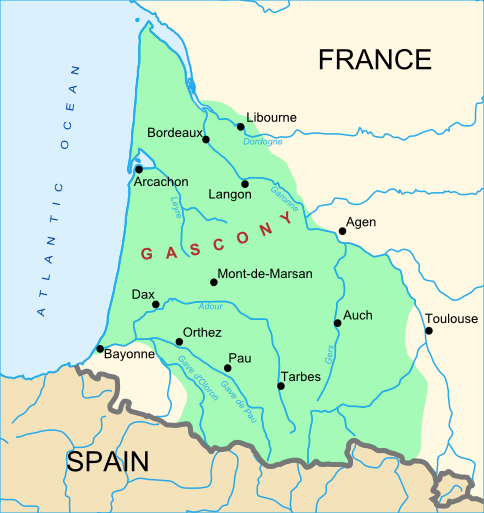
A map of Gascony, showing a wide definition of the region. Other definitions may encompass a smaller area.

Gascony (/ˈɡæskəni/; French: Gascogne [ɡaskɔɲ]; Occitan: Gasconha [ɡasˈkuɲɔ]) was a province of the southwestern Kingdom of France that succeeded the Duchy of Gascony (602–1453). From the 17th century until the French Revolution (1789–1799), it was part of the combined Province of Guyenne and Gascony. The region is vaguely defined, and the distinction between Guyenne and Gascony is unclear; by some they are seen to overlap, while others consider Gascony a part of Guyenne. Most definitions put Gascony east and south of Bordeaux.

It is currently divided between the region of Nouvelle-Aquitaine (departments of Landes, Pyrénées-Atlantiques, southwestern Gironde, and southern Lot-et-Garonne) and the region of Occitanie (departments of Gers, Hautes-Pyrénées, southwestern Tarn-et-Garonne, and western Haute-Garonne).

Gascony was historically inhabited by Basque-related people who appear to have spoken a language similar to Basque. The name Gascony comes from the same root as the word Basque (see Wasconia below). From the Middle Ages until today, the Gascon language has been spoken, usually classified as a regional variety of the Occitan language. Ruled by the Plantagenet kings of England from 1152, the duchy functioned as an overseas English possession—sometimes described by historians as England's first colony—and was a primary source of dispute during the Hundred Years' War until its French reconquest in 1453. It was home to Henry III of Navarre, who in 1594 became king of France as Henry IV.

Gascony is the land of d'Artagnan, who inspired Alexandre Dumas's character d'Artagnan in The Three Musketeers, as well as the land of Cyrano de Bergerac, the eponymous character of the play by Edmond Rostand and the home of Emily St. Aubert, the central character of The Mysteries of Udolpho by Ann Radcliffe.

== History ==
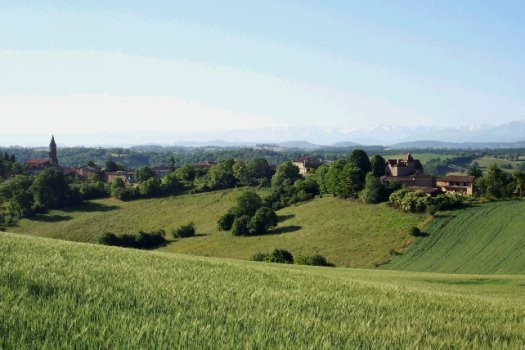
Typical view of the hilly countryside of Gascony, with the Pyrenees mountains in the far distance

=== Aquitania ===
In pre-Roman times, the inhabitants of Gascony were the Aquitanians (Latin: Aquitani), who spoke a non-Indo-European language related to modern Basque.

The Aquitanians inhabited a territory limited to the north and east by the river Garonne, to the south by the Pyrenees mountain range, and to the west by the Atlantic Ocean. The Romans called this territory Aquitania, either from the Latin word aqua (meaning "water"), in reference to the many rivers flowing from the Pyrenees through the area, or from the name of the Aquitanian Ausci tribe, in which case Aquitania would mean "land of the Ausci".

In the 50s BC, Aquitania was conquered by lieutenants of Julius Caesar and became part of the Roman Empire.

Later, in 27 BC, during the reign of Emperor Augustus, the province of Gallia Aquitania was created. Gallia Aquitania was far larger than the original Aquitania, as it extended north of the Garonne, in fact all the way north to the river Loire, thus including the Celtic Gauls that inhabited the regions between the rivers Garonne and Loire.

=== Novempopulana ===
In 297, as Emperor Diocletian reformed the administrative structures of the Roman Empire, Aquitania was split into three provinces. The territory south of the Garonne River, corresponding to the original Aquitania, was made a province called Novempopulania (that is, "land of the nine tribes"), while the part of Gallia Aquitania north of the Garonne became the province of Aquitanica I and the province of Aquitanica II. The territory of Novempopulania corresponded mostly to that of modern Gascony.

The Aquitania Novempopulana or Novempopulania suffered like the rest of the Western Roman Empire from the invasions of Germanic tribes, most notably the Vandals in 407–409. In 416–418, Novempopulania was delivered to the Visigoths as their federate settlement lands and became part of the Visigoth kingdom of Toulouse, while other than the region of the Garonne river their actual grip on the area may have been rather loose.

The Visigoths were defeated by the Franks in 507, and fled into Spain and Septimania. Novempopulania then became part of the Frankish Kingdom like the rest of southern France. However, Novempopulania was far away from the home base of the Franks in northern France, and was only very loosely controlled by the Franks. During all the troubled and historically obscure period, starting from early 5th-century accounts, the bagaudae are often cited, social uprisings against tax exaction and feudalization, largely associated to Vasconic unrest.

=== Duchy of Gascony ===
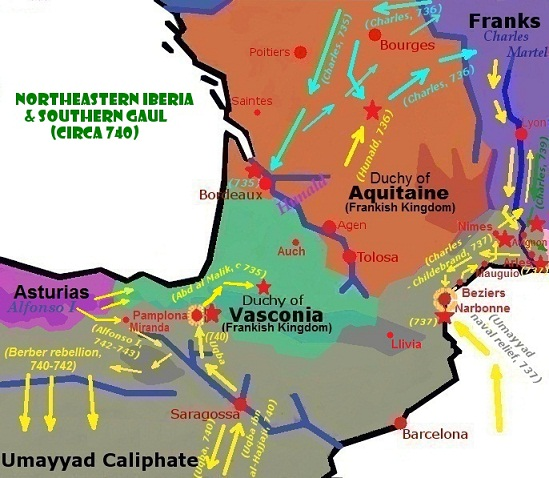
The Duchy was meant to hold sway over the Basques (Vascones).

Early modern and 19th-century historical literature—such as the works of Pierre de Marca (1640) and Jean de Jaurgain (1898)—claimed that the Basques took control of the whole of Novempopulania in the Early Middle Ages. The claim is founded on a 587 AD testimony of Gregory of Tours, and on the etymological link between the words "Basque" and "Gascon". Both are derived from Vascones or Wasconia, the latter being used in Merovingian sources to name the whole of Novempopulania.

Modern historians have rejected this earlier hypothesis, which has no archeological evidence. For Juan José Larrea, and Pierre Bonnassie, "a Vascon expansionism in Aquitany is not proved and is not necessary to understand the historical evolution of this region". This Basque-related culture and race is, whatever the origin, attested in (mainly Carolingian) Medieval documents, while their exact boundaries remain unclear ("Wascones, qui trans Garonnam et circa Pirineum montem habitant" -- "Wascones, who live across the Garonne and around the Pyrenees mountains", as stated in the Royal Frankish Annals, for one).

The word Vasconia evolved into Wasconia, and then into Gasconia (w often evolved into g under the influence of Romance languages; cf. warranty and guarantee, warden and guardian, wile and guile, William and Guillaume). The gradual abandonment of the Basque-related Aquitanian language in favor of a local Vulgar Latin was not reversed. The replacing local Vulgar Latin evolved into Gascon. It was heavily influenced by the original Aquitanian language (for example, Latin f became h; cf. Latin fortia, French force, Spanish fuerza, Occitan fòrça, but Gascon hòrça). The Basques from the French side of the Basque Country traditionally call anyone who does not speak Basque a "Gascon" (kaskoin / gaskoin).

Meanwhile, Viking raiders devastated several Gascon towns in 842–844, including Bayonne and Dax. Their incursions into Gascony accelerated the political fragmentation of the duchy until their decisive defeat by Duke William II Sánchez at Taller in 982. Weakened by these disruptions and the broader spread of feudalism, the early medieval Duchy of Vasconia splintered into numerous counties and viscounties such as Fézensac, Armagnac, Astarac, Bigorre, and Béarn—ruled by local Gascon lords.

=== Angevin Empire ===
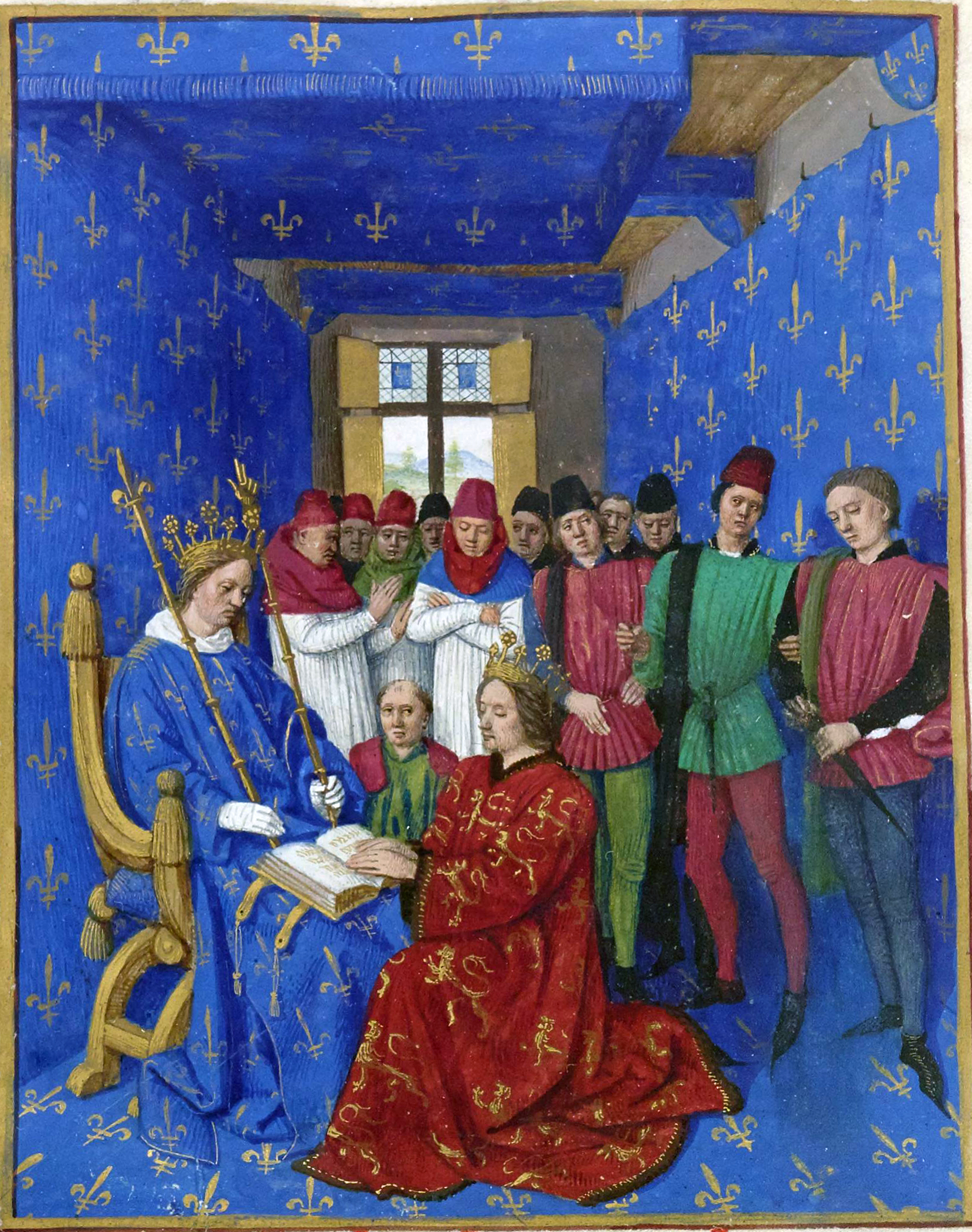
Homage of Edward I (kneeling) to Philip IV (seated)

Coat of arms of Gascony

The 1152 marriage of Henry II and Eleanor of Aquitaine allowed the former to gain control of his new wife's possessions of Aquitaine and Gascony. This addition to his already plentiful holdings made Henry the most powerful vassal in France.

In 1248, Simon de Montfort was appointed Governor in the unsettled Duchy of Gascony. Bitter complaints were excited by de Montfort's rigour in suppressing the excesses of both the seigneurs of the nobility and the contending factions in the great communes. Henry III yielded to the outcry and instituted a formal inquiry into Simon's administration. Simon was formally acquitted of the charges, but in August 1252 he was nevertheless dismissed. Henry then himself went to Gascony, pursuing a policy of conciliation; he arranged the marriage between Edward, his 14-year-old son, and Eleanor of Castile, sister of Alfonso X. Alfonso renounced all claims to Gascony and assisted the Plantagenets against rebels such as Gaston de Bearn, who had taken control of the Pyrenees.

In December 1259, Louis IX of France ceded to Henry land north and east of Gascony. In return, Henry renounced his claim to many of the territories that had been lost by King John.

In May 1286, King Edward I paid homage before the new king, Philip IV of France, for the lands in Gascony. However, in May 1294, Philip confiscated the lands, initiating the Gascon War. Between 1294 and 1298, Edward sent three expeditionary forces to recover Gascony, but Philip was able to retain most of the territory until the Treaty of Paris in 1303.

In 1324, when Edward II of England in his capacity as Duke of Aquitaine failed to pay homage to the French king after a dispute, Charles IV declared the duchy forfeit at the end of June 1324, and military action by the French followed. Edward sent his wife Isabella, who was sister to the French king, to negotiate a settlement. The Queen departed for France on 9 March 1325, and in September was joined by her son, the heir to the throne, Prince Edward the later Edward III of England. Isabella's negotiations were successful, and it was agreed that the young Prince Edward would perform homage in the king's place, which he did on 24 September and so the duchy was returned to the English crown.

When France's Charles IV died in 1328 leaving only daughters, his nearest male relative was Edward III of England, the son of Isabella, the sister of the dead king; but the question arose whether she could legally transmit the inheritance of the throne of France to her son even though she herself, as a woman, could not inherit the throne. The assemblies of the French barons and prelates and the University of Paris decided that males who derive their right to inheritance through their mother should be excluded. Thus the nearest heir through male ancestry was Charles IV's first cousin, Philip, Count of Valois, and it was decided that he should be crowned Philip VI of France. Philip believed that Edward III was in breach of his obligations as vassal, so in May 1337 he met with his Great Council in Paris. It was agreed that Gascony should be taken back into Philip's hands, thus precipitating the Hundred Years War between England and France. At the end of the Hundred Years' War, after Gascony had changed hands several times, the English were finally defeated at the Battle of Castillon on 17 July 1453; Gascony remained French from then on.

=== Province of Guyenne and Gascony ===
Flag of Gascony, Union Gascona (Gascon Union)

From the 17th century onwards, the government of Gascony was united with Guyenne. The government of Guyenne and Gascony (Guienne et Gascogne), with its capital at Bordeaux, lasted until the end of the Ancien Régime in 1792.

== Geography ==
Current communes and departments included in the ancient province of Gascony

Gascony is limited by the Atlantic Ocean (western limit) and the Pyrenees mountains (southern limit); as the area of Gascon language, it extends to the Garonne (North), and close to the Ariège (river) (East) from the Pyrenees to the confluence of the Garonne with the Ariège. The other most important river is Adour, along with its tributaries Gave de Pau and Gave d'Oloron.

The most important towns are:

- Auch, the historical capital
- Bayonne, with both Basque and Gascon identity
- Bordeaux, crossed by the Garonne
- Dax
- Lourdes
- Luchon
- Mont-de-Marsan
- Pau, with both Bearnese and Gascon identity
- Tarbes

Bayonne, Dax and Tarbes are crossed by the Adour. Pau and Lourdes are crossed by the Gave de Pau. Mont-de-Marsan also belongs to the drainage basin of the Adour. The Gers (river), a tributary of the Garonne, flows through Auch.
