= Viking incursions into Gascony =

Viking incursions into Gascony began with a first raid in 840 and ended in 982 with the battle of Taller.

Since 1911, the historians and linguists have been showing that only the Vikings who distinguished themselves north of the Loire and founded Normandy were well enough documented to be worthy of interest. In the wake of Lucien Musset in France, they have never found any reason (documents, archeological sites or artefacts) to start to study seriously the actions of the Vikings south of the Loire. Lucien Musset wrote as follows: "The Norwegian raids south of the English Channel, pure pirate ventures, left no lasting traces, on the Loire, the Garonne or the Bay of Biscay".... For their part, Aquitaine historians, following in the footsteps of Charles Higounet, consider the 9th and 10th centuries as "white pages" of history. "Between the catastrophe of the mid-9th century and the end of the 10th, the history of Bordeaux is almost a blank page, for lack of documents". In 2008, the historian Frédéric Boutoulle concluded that the sources in Gascony did not allow us to form an idea and that salvation could only come from an archaeological discovery. However, uncompleted and disputed sources do exist, some contemporary -Annales Bertiniani, Andreas of Bergamo- and others later. These sources would state that the Vikings carried out operations south of the Loire that went far beyond simple attacks on defenseless monasteries. They describe massive attacks followed by installations and takeovers of the territory. In other words, these sources describe an invasion. The lack of archaeological finds, the absence of linguistic elements, both in onomastics (personal names, place names) and borrowing of words from a Scandinavian language in the local Occitan dialect, Gasconic Occitan, tend to prove that these writings have greatly exaggerated the facts. There is no evidence of Viking settlements in Gascony. In addition, new genetic studies show that the Gascons are close to the Basques (as their name indicates) and not related to the Scandinavians.

This did not prevent the medievalist Renée Mussot Goulard specializing in the Goths in Aquitaine from asserting in the 1990s, that the Scandinavian presence in Gascony was "the longest known Scandinavian occupation in the kingdom".

== Annales Bertiniani and their depictions of Viking assaults ==
Annales Bertiniani are the reference source for the period. They describe large-scale attacks (844, 847, 857, 864), installations (843, 845, an alliance with Pepin II of Aquitaine (857, 864), but also the first ascent of a river by a Viking fleet (the Garonne in 844) and the first siege of a Frankish city in the West (Bordeaux in 847–848).

== Raid : Gascony in 840. ==
An invasion of Gascony is evoked by the cartulary of Lescar "The cities which were destroyed are Dax, Lescar, Oloron, Tarbes, Auch, Eauze, Saint Lizier, Saint-Bertrand de Comminges, Lectoure, Sos, Bazas, Bayonne so that the Gascons remained in oblivion for a long time because no bishop was appointed there any more. ". Other sources evoke the devastation committed by the men of the North during this initial offensive. (Geste des Toulousains by Nicolas Bertrand (1515), Cartulaire de Bigorre, ).

The Geste des Toulousains states that this attack would have taken place in 840, the year before the first Viking attack on Rouen. This date seems to be confirmed by the Chronicle of Fontenelle, the Chronicle of Tours

This attack affected not only Gascony on the left bank of the Garonne, but also Aquitaine on the right bank from 844 onwards. (Carte)

In 860, Andreas of Bergamo wrote about the battle of Fontenoy-en-Puisaye which took place in 841: "A great massacre was made, especially among the nobles of Aquitaine [...]. To this day, the nobility of Aquitaine is so devastated that the Normans take over its lands and it has no strength to resist them." This taking of possession is also evoked by Guillaume de Jumièges. "Having destroyed the bravest offspring of its soil, it (Aquitaine) was then left in prey to foreign races [...]. No country was able to preserve its freedom, and there was no castle, no village, no town that did not succumb to the blows of the Pagans following a massacre."

== Anarchy in Gascony ==
In 858, Annales Bertiniani evokes: "Bernon, duke of this portion of Normandy who lived on the Seine, comes to King Charles in the palace of Verberie, and, putting his hands in his own, swears loyalty to him". This submission is in fact a treaty. In six years, Björn Ironside has just rolled Western Francia. Ruined, at the head of a kingdom adrift, Charles the Bald necessarily granted land to his victor. However, the only lands that will no longer be referred to as part of the kingdom are Saintonge and Gascony. Adhémar de Chabannes tells us that in 868, Charles the Bald regained control of Aquitaine and appointed Vulgrin, already Count of Agen, as head of the counties of Périgueux and Angoulême. Saintes, Charentes-Maritime and Bordeaux - a priori occupied by the Northmen - were not affected by this takeover.

Charles Higounet saw it as the constitution of a military march to oppose the pagans. Their presence in the region is confirmed by the abandonment of the Bordeaux siege by Frothaire in 876: "One read the petition of Frothaire, bishop of Bordeaux, who could not remain in his city because of the infestation of the pagans, asked that he be allowed to live in the metropolis of the country of Bourges. The bishops unanimously rejected this petition". Information confirmed by the Letter of Pope John VIII of October 28, 876 defending Frothaire.

The Scandinavian presence in the region at that time is confirmed by the Chronicle of Guîtres. In 887, Frothaire still did not return to Bordeaux and Pope Stephen V complained about it in a letter addressed to the archbishops of Lyon and Rheims.

"Gascony in the 880s was in full desolation. No traveller ventured to cross it, especially in its western part, which was more affected than the others". The Martyrology of Usuard and Flodoard tells us. This abandonment is confirmed by another source: "The Archbishop of Auch, for his part, in 879 had only three suffragists installed in the eastern seats while the west was totally deprived of pastors". Letters and decrees of Pope John VIII.

== The end of the Vikings in Gascony. ==
During this period, we find no trace of any monastery foundation, no tax levy, no donations, which seems to indicate a lack of Christian power in the region. It is known that in 976, the Count of Périgueux and Bordeaux lost his life fighting the Pagans. Without an heir, Bordeaux returned to the Count of Gascony. In the 980s, probably in 982, the troops of the Count of Gascony and his wife, Urraca, princess of Pamplona, faced the men of the North in a bloody battle. The battle of Taller near Dax would have definitively rid Gascony of the Scandinavian threat. This battle is mentioned in the Charter of the foundation of the Abbey of Saint Sever and in the History of the Abbey of Condom This victory would have put an end to Scandinavian domination in Gascony and paved the way for the restoration of the Church of Gascony.

== Controversy ==
The historians contest this invasion followed by an occupation and in particular the existence of a Viking principality in Gascony However, since the history of Gascony is a "blank page for lack of sources", no historian can say which power, capable of repelling the Northmen, would have dominated the country. The hypothesis of a Scandinavian conquest remains valid but without any kind of material proof such as archeological artifacts or linguistic traces such as local anthroponyms, toponyms or any word in the local language, Gasconic. All the more so as the sources cast doubt on the idea that the men of the North behaved as vulgar plunderers of monasteries with no ambitions south of the Loire.

According to the writer Joël Supéry, the Ragnar clan, originally from the Vestfold, initiated the invasions and invaded Gascony to get their hands on a trade route between Bayonne and Narbonne, a route that dispensed the clan from crossing the dangerous Strait of Gibraltar dominated by the Emir of Cordoba to access Mediterranean trade.
