= Amanieu =

Amanieu may refer to:

- Amanieu IV d'Albret (c. 1150 – c. 1175)
- Amanieu de la Broqueira (fl. 1188), troubadour
- Amanieu V d'Albret (r. 1209–1255)
- Amanieu I (archbishop of Auch) (r. 1226–1241)
- Amanieu VI d'Albret (r. 1255–1272)
- Amanieu II (archbishop of Auch) (r. 1261–1318)
- Amanieu de Sescars (fl. 1278–1295), troubadour
- Amanieu VII d'Albret (r. 1298–1326)
- Amanieu of Astarac (c. 1295 – c. 1326), exile
- Amanieu de Fargues, bishop of Agen (r. 1314–1357)
- Amanieu du Foussat (fl. 1309–1320), seneschal of Gascony
- Amanieu de Cazes, archbishop of Bordeaux (r. 1347–1348)
- Amanieu de La Mothe, archbishop of Bordeaux (r. 1351–1360)
- Amanieu d'Albret (1478–1520), cardinal
- Amanieu de Foix, bishop of Mâcon (r. 1557–1559)

== See also ==
- Arnaud Amanieu d'Albret (1338–1401)
