= Anne of Armagnac =

French noblewoman

- Dame d'Albret; Countess of Dreux
- Coat-of-arms of the Armagnac family
- Born: 1402; Gages, near Rodez, France
- Died: Before March 1473
- Noble family: Armagnac
- Spouse: Charles II d'Albret
- Issue: Jean I d'Albret, Sire d'Albret, Viscount of Talvas; Arnaud Amanieu d'Albret, Sire d'Orval; Charles d'Albret, Seigneur de Sainte-Bazielle; Cardinal Louis d'Albret, Bishop of Cahors; Gilles d'Albret, Seigneur Castelmoron; Marie d'Albret; Jeanne d'Albret, Countess of Dreux
- Father: Bernard VII of Armagnac, Count of Charolais, Count of Armagnac
- Mother: Bonne de Berry

Anne of Armagnac, Dame d'Albret, Countess of Dreux (1402 – before March 1473) was a French noblewoman and a member of the powerful Gascon Armagnac family which played a prominent role in French politics during the Hundred Years War and were the principal adversaries of the Burgundians throughout the Armagnac-Burgundian Civil War. Anne was the wife of Charles II d'Albret.

== Family ==
Anne was born in 1402 in Gages, near Rodez, France, the daughter of Bernard VII of Armagnac, Count of Charolais, Count of Armagnac, and Bonne de Berry. Anne had six siblings; these included John IV of Armagnac, Bernard of Armagnac, and Bonne of Armagnac, wife of Charles, Duke of Orléans. She had three half-siblings from her mother's marriage to Count Amadeus, including Amadeus VIII of Savoy.

Her paternal grandparents were John II of Armagnac and Jeanne de Périgord, and her maternal grandparents were John, Duke of Berry and Jeanne of Armagnac.

Anne's father was head of the powerful, pro-French, pro-Orléans Armagnac party which played a prominent role in French politics in the early 15th century, and whose bitter opponents during the Armagnac-Burgundian Civil War were the pro-English Burgundians, headed by John the Fearless. On 30 December 1415, her father was appointed Constable of France. He controlled the government of the Dauphin Charles (the future King Charles VII of France). On 12 June 1418, he was assassinated by rioting Parisians.

Anne died on an unknown date sometime before March 1473. Her husband Charles died in 1471. The lordship of Albret passed to Alain, the grandson of Charles and Anne; the county of Dreux went to Arnaud Amanieu, but was later seized by Alain.

== Marriage and issue ==
On 28 October 1417, a marriage contract was drawn up and signed, and less than six months later, on 23 April 1418, Anne married Charles II d'Albret, Sire d'Albret and titular Count of Dreux (1401–1471). He was the eldest son of Charles d'Albret, Constable of France who had been killed at the Battle of Agincourt on 25 October 1415, and of Marie de Sully, Princess of Boisbelle.

Charles and Anne together had:

- Jean I d'Albret, Sire d'Albet, Viscount of Talvas (died 3 January 1468), married Charlotte de Rohan in 1447, by whom he had four children, including Alain I of Albret, father-in-law of Cesare Borgia.
- Arnaud Amanieu d'Albret, Sire d'Orval (died 1463), married 25 November 1457, as her second husband, Isabelle de La Tour d'Auvergne (died 8 September 1488), daughter of Bertrand V de La Tour, Count of Auvergne and Boulogne and Jacquette du Peschin, by whom he had three children, including Jean d'Albret, Sire of Orval, father of Marie of Albret, Countess of Rethel.
- Charles d'Albret, Seigneur de Sainte-Bazielle (beheaded 7 April 1473), married Marie d'Astarac
- Louis d'Albret (1422- 4 September 1465), Cardinal, Bishop of Cahors
- Gilles d'Albret, Seigneur Castelmoron (died 8 August 1479), married Anne d'Aguillon, by whom he had issue.
- Marie d'Albret (died after 4 January 1485), on 11 June 1456 married Charles de Nevers, Count of Nevers and Count of Rethel. The marriage was childless.
- Jeanne II d'Albret, Countess of Dreux (died 20 September 1444), in 1442 married, as his second wife, Arthur III, Duke of Brittany. The marriage was childless.

== Later years and death ==
In 1470, Anne is recorded as having owned une pierre pour toucher les yeux, enchassié en or (a stone for touching the eyes, set in gold). It is not known how or where she acquired this "magical stone" which allegedly had healing powers.

She died sometime before March 1473.

== Ancestry ==
Ancestors of Anne of Armagnac

Bernard VI of Armagnac, Count of Armagnac
John I of Armagnac, Count of Armagnac
Cecile de Rodez
John II of Armagnac, Count of Armagnac
Jean de Clermont, Count of St. Charolais
Beatrice de Clermont, Dame de Charolais
Jeanne d'Argies
Bernard VII of Armagnac, Count of Charolais, Count of Armagnac
Hélie IX Talairand, Count of Périgord
Roger-Bernard I, Count of Périgord
Brunissende de Foix
Jeanne de Périgord
Bouchard VI of Vendôme
Eléonore de Vendôme
Alix of Brittany
Anne of Armagnac
Philip VI of France
John II of France
Jeanne of Burgundy
John, Duke of Berry
John the Blind of Luxembourg
Bonne of Luxembourg
Elisabeth of Bohemia
Bonne de Berry
Bernard VI of Armagnac, Count of Armagnac
John I of Armagnac, Count of Armagnac
Cecile de Rodez
Jeanne of Armagnac
Jean de Clermont, Count of St. Charolais
Beatrice of Clermont, Dame de Charolais
Jeanne d'Argies

== Sources ==
- Autrand, Françoise (2000). Jean de Berry: L'art et le pouvoir (in French). Fayard. ISBN 9782213648156.
- Chattaway, Carol Mary (2006). The Order of the Golden Tree: The Gift-giving Objectives of Duke Philip the Bold of Burgundy (PDF). Isd.
- Sumption, Jonathan (2015). The Hundred Years War, Volume 4: Cursed Kings. University of Pennsylvania Press.
