= Marie de Sully =

Marie de Sully or Seuly (1365 – c. 1409/1410) was the Sovereign (Princess) of Boisbelle (today known as Henrichemont). She was the daughter of Louis I de Sully and his wife, Isabelle de Craon (died 1394).

== Early life and engagement ==
Upon the death of her father in 1382, Marie became the sole heiress and successor to the Principality of Boisbelle, a fact made all the more unique because the principality was not under the same Salic law that forbade women from inheriting the throne of France. As sovereign, Marie possessed the authority to make laws, administer justice, and mint money. The inhabitants of the principality were also free from having to pay taxes or render services to the Crown, and could not be conscripted into the armed forces, although they did remain subject to the requirements of the Roman Catholic Church.

Because of her unique status as her father's sole heiress, Marie became one of the most desirable heiresses in France. Her mother, Isabelle, entered into a contract with John "the Magnificent", Duke of Berry, son of King John II of France and Bonne of Luxembourg, on 27 July 1381, in which Marie was betrothed to his son Charles of Berry, Count of Montpensier. In order to cover costs, Isabelle ceded to the duke her own Barony of Châteauneuf-sur-Sarthe. However, before the marriage could be fulfilled, Charles died. Even though she had not married him, Marie wore a widow's veil in mourning for the passing of her intended.

== First marriage ==
It was not long before Marie was engaged to and went on to marry a renowned knight and crusader, Guy VI de La Trémoille. Through this advantageous marriage, Guy became Sovereign of Boisbelle. Among their many acts was the construction of the present Château de Sully-sur-Loire, which would become the seat of the Lords of Sully, successors of Marie through her first marriage to Guy.

In about 1396, Guy participated in the crusade with John the Fearless, later to become Duke of Burgundy upon his father’s death in 1404, as part of the forces sent to assist King Sigismund of Hungary in his war against the Sultan Bayezid I. They fought at the Battle of Nicopolis on 25 September 1396, which ended in disastrous defeat, to the point that Guy was captured and imprisoned along with John, to be ransomed at the cost of 200,000 ducats, of which Guy was ransomed at the cost of 8,500 ducats. However, upon his return journey, he grew ill and died at Rhodes in 1397, leaving Marie a widow alone with underaged children.

== Second marriage ==
On 27 January 1400, Marie remarried to one of the most renowned nobles in France of his time, Charles I d'Albret of Gascony, Lord of Albret and Constable of France. Through his mother, he was the cousin of King Charles VI of France. Charles would go on to become co-commander of the French army at the Battle of Agincourt on 25 October 1415, where he was slain in combat against the English forces led by King Henry V.

== Death ==
Before Charles’ death in battle, Princess Marie died in Pau, Kingdom of Navarre, between 6 September 1409 and 17 February 1410, the date in which an inventory of her furniture and goods was made.

== Issue and descendants ==
From her first marriage to Guy VI de La Trémoille, Marie had seven children, four of which were still living at the time of their father's death, including:

- Jean de La Trémoille (d. 1449), Seigneur de Jonvelle, who married on 17 July 1424 Jacqueline d'Amboise, daughter of Ingerger II and Jeanne de Craon.
- Georges I de La Trémoille (d. 1446), who succeeded his mother to the title of Count of Guînes as well as to the Lordship of Sully. He married twice, and had issue, as well as three natural children between two mistresses.
- Isabeau de La Trémoille, second wife of Charles I de La Rivière, son of Bureau de La Rivière, no known issue.

From her second marriage to Charles I d'Albret, Marie had the following issue:

- Jeanne d'Albret (1403 – 1433), married in 1422 to John I, Count of Foix, as his second wife, and the only one to have issue.
- Charles II d'Albret (1407 – 1471), married Anne of Armagnac (b. 1402), daughter of Bernard VII of Armagnac, and had issue.
- Guillaume d'Albret, Seigneur d'Orval, who perished at the Battle of the Herrings on 12 February 1429, and had no issue.
- Jean d'Albret, died without issue.
- Catherine d'Albret, who married Charles de Montagu (1363 – 1409), and had issue.

Among Marie’s descendants is Jeanne d'Albret, who ruled Navarre as Queen Jeanne III, wife of Antoine of Bourbon. Their son, Henry of Navarre, would rule France as King Henry IV, and would become a close friend of Maximilien de Béthune, 1st Duke of Sully, known as “Grand Sully”, who would redevelop Boisbelle into the present-day Henrichemont, named in Henry IV’s honour.

Also among her descendants is Charles de Saint-Étienne de La Tour, who served as Governor of Acadia from 1631 to 1642, and again from 1653 to 1657. He was the son of Huguenot Claude de Saint-Étienne de La Tour and Marie’s direct descendant, Marie Amador de Salazar. Their descendants would go on to inhabit Acadia and Louisiana.

== Titles ==
Aside from her rule as Princess of Boisbelle, Marie was also Countess of Guînes, Baroness of Sully, Baroness of Craon, Lady of La Chapelle-d'Angillon and des Aix-Dam-Gilon, of Saint-Gondon, of Châteaumeillant, of Bruère, of Épineuil, of Corberin, of Sainte-Hermine, of Prahecq, of Lussac, of Champagne, of Bois de Chisay, of Montrond, of Argent, of Clémont, of Villebon, of Orval, of Dun-Le-Roi, and of Châlucet.

== Bibliography ==
- Biu, Hélène (2002). "Du panégyrique à l'histoire : l'archiviste Michel de Bernis, chroniqueur des comtes de Foix (1445)". Bibliothèque de l'École des chartes (in French). 160 (2): 385–473. doi:10.3406/bec.2002.451098.
- Bradbury, Jim (2004). The Routledge Companion to Medieval Warfare. Routledge.
- Chattaway, Carol Mary (2006). The Order of the Golden Tree: The Gift-giving Objectives of Duke Philip the Bold of Burgundy. Isd.
- Depuichault, Adrienne (1865). Histoire du Royaume de Bois-Belle. C. Douniol.
- Galand, Gérard (2005). Les seigneurs de Châteauneuf-sur-Sarthe en Anjou (in French). Cheminements.
- Smith, Robert Douglas & DeVries, K. (2005). The Artillery of the Dukes of Burgundy, 1363–1477. Woodbridge: Boydell Press. ISBN 978-1-84383-162-4.
- Wagner, John A., ed. (2006). "Albret, Charles, Lord of, Constanble of France". Encyclopedia of the Hundred Years War. Greenwood Press.
