= Bonne of Armagnac =

- Duchess of Orléans
- Marriage of Charles and Bonne at the Chateau de Dourdan – from the Très Riches Heures du duc de Berry
- Born: 19 February 1399; Lavardens
- Died: 1430–35; Castelnau-de-Montmiral
- Spouse: Charles I, Duke of Orléans (m. 1410)
- House: Armagnac
- Father: Bernard VII, Count of Armagnac
- Mother: Bonne of Berry

Bonne of Armagnac (19 February 1399 – 1430/35) was the eldest daughter of Bernard VII, Count of Armagnac and Constable of France, and his wife Bonne of Berry.

== Marriage ==
On 15 April 1410 at the age of 11, she married Charles I, Duke of Orléans (left an orphan by his father Louis's assassination in 1407). This marriage made her father not only Charles's father-in-law but also his natural defender. The Orléans party, left without a leader by Louis's death, thus became the Armagnac party, the name it held up to the Treaty of Arras in 1435, ending the civil war with the Burgundians.

Charles joined the French army at the Battle of Agincourt on 25 October 1415, and following the French defeat, Charles was taken prisoner by the English. Bonne had not borne any children prior to his imprisonment. She died sometime between 1430 and 1435 while her husband was still in captivity.

== In literature and art ==
Bonne appears in the critically acclaimed historical novel Het woud der verwachting (1949) by Hella Haasse, (translated into English in 1989 under the title "In a Dark Wood Wandering"). The novel portrays the life of Bonne's husband Charles.

Charles and Bonne's marriage at the Chateau de Dourdan may be depicted in the elaborate illuminated manuscript entitled Très Riches Heures du duc de Berry (Very Rich Hours of the Duke of Berry) in the illustration for April.

== Ancestry ==
Ancestors of Bonne of Armagnac

16. Bernard VI of Armagnac, Count of Armagnac (=28)
8. John I of Armagnac, Count of Armagnac (=14)
17. Cecile de Rodez (=29)
4. John II of Armagnac, Count of Armagnac
18. Jean de Clermont, Count of St. Charolais (=30)
9. Beatrice de Clermont, Dame de Charolais (=15)
19. Jeanne d'Argies (=31)
2. Bernard VII of Armagnac, Count of Charolais, Count of Armagnac
20. Helie IX Talairand, Count of Périgord
10. Roger-Bernard I, Count of Périgord
21. Brunissende de Foix
5. Jeanne de Périgord
22. Bouchard VI of Vendôme
11. Eléonore de Vendôme
23. Alix of Brittany
1. Bonne of Armagnac
24. Philip VI of France
12. John II of France
25. Jeanne of Burgundy
6. John, Duke of Berry
26. John the Blind of Luxembourg
13. Bonne of Luxembourg
27. Elisabeth of Bohemia
3. Bonne de Berry
28. Bernard VI of Armagnac, Count of Armagnac (=16)
14. John I of Armagnac, Count of Armagnac (=8)
29. Cecile de Rodez (=17)
7. Jeanne of Armagnac
30. Jean de Clermont, Count of St. Charolais (=18)
15. Beatrice of Clermont, Dame de Charolais (=9)
31. Jeanne d'Argies (=19)

== Sources ==
- Neillands, Robin (2001). The Hundred Years War. London: Routledge. ISBN 0-415-26131-7.
