= Margaret of Bourbon, Lady of Albret =

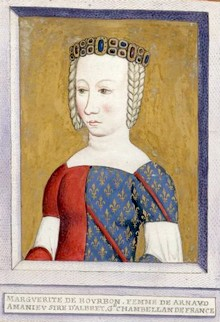
Margaret of Bourbon

Marguerite de Bourbon, Lady of Albret (1344–1416) was a daughter of Peter I, Duke of Bourbon, and his wife Isabella of France, who was a daughter of Charles, Count of Valois. Margaret was a member of the House of Bourbon.

Margaret married Arnaud Amanieu, Lord of Albret, on 30 June 1368; the marriage was the outcome of a secret treaty between King Charles V of France and Arnaud Amanieu. The couple had one son, Charles I d'Albret, who succeeded Arnaud Amanieu as Lord of Albret and Count of Dreux in 1401 and was appointed Constable of France in 1402. He was killed at the Battle of Agincourt in 1415.

== Ancestry ==
Ancestors of Margaret of Bourbon, Lady of Albret

8. Robert, Count of Clermont
4. Louis I, Duke of Bourbon
9. Beatrice, Lady of Bourbon
2. Peter I, Duke of Bourbon
10. John II, Count of Holland
5. Mary of Avesnes
11. Philippa of Luxembourg
1. Marguerite de Bourbon, Lady of Albret
12. Philip III of France
6. Charles, Count of Valois
13. Isabella of Aragon
3. Isabella of Valois
14. Guy IV, Count of Saint-Pol
7. Mahaut of Châtillon
15. Marie of Brittany

== Sources ==
- Autrand, Françoise (1994). Charles V (in French). Fayard.
