= Bonne of Berry =

- Countess of Savoy; Countess of Armagnac
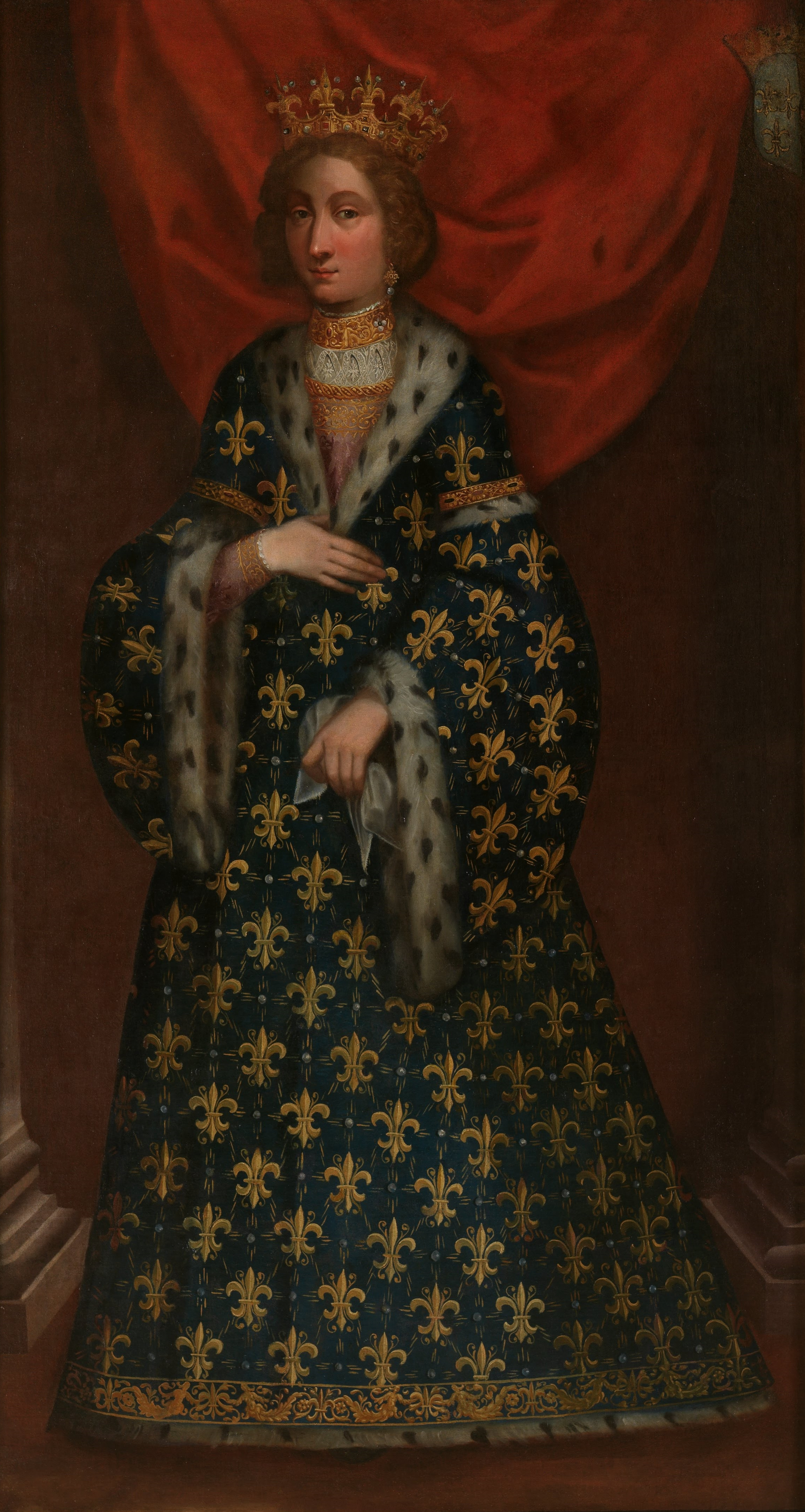
- Born: 1362 or 1365
- Died: 30 December 1435 (aged 69–70); Carlat
- Spouse: Amadeus VII, Count of Savoy; Bernard VII, Count of Armagnac
- Issue: Amadeus VIII, Duke of Savoy; Bonne of Savoy; Joan of Savoy; John IV, Count of Armagnac; Bonne, Duchess of Orléans; Barnard, Count of Pardiac; Anne, Countess of Dreux; Jeanne of Armagnac; Béatrix of Armagnac
- House: Valois
- Father: John, Duke of Berry
- Mother: Joanna of Armagnac

Bonne of Berry (1367 – 30 December 1435) was a French countess. She was Countess of Savoy by marriage to Amadeus VII, Count of Savoy. When she was widowed, she unsuccessfully claimed the regency during her son's minority against her mother-in-law in 1391–93. As niece of King Charles V of France, she played a key role in French diplomatic maneuvers intended to consolidate the alliances of the kingdom of France.

She was the daughter of John, Duke of Berry, and Joanna of Armagnac. Through her father, she was a granddaughter of John II of France. Born at the château de Mehun-sur-Yèvre in the beginning of 1367, she was named after her paternal grandmother, Bonne of Luxembourg.

== Countess consort of Savoy ==
She was first betrothed to Amadeus VII, Count of Savoy, on 7 May 1372 with a royal dowry of 100,000 francs provided by her uncle. The marriage was celebrated on 18 January 1377 in the presence of the King, but Bonne did not move to Savoy to live with her husband until March 1381, when she was 14 years old. They had the following children:

- Amadeus VIII, Duke of Savoy (1383 – 1439); married Mary of Burgundy.
- Bonne of Savoy (1388 – 1432); married Louis of Piedmont.
- Joan of Savoy (posthumously 1392 – 1460); married Giangiacomo Paleologo, marquis of Montferrat.

After Amadeus' death in 1391 from tetanus, a regency dispute over their son Amadeus VIII ensued after her husband passed over Bonne in favor of his mother Bonne of Bourbon, who became regent of the new count during his minority instead. As a result, the counts mother Bonne of Berry established herself with her followers in Montmélian, and his grandmother Bonne of Bourbon with her followers in Chambéry. This conflict, which was in danger of developing to a civil war, would only be resolved by an agreement, signed on 8 May 1393. The agreement was negotiated with the intervention of the King of France. In accordance with the agreement, Bonne of Bourbon signed over the lordship of Faucigny to her daughter-in-law. Bonne subsequently left her children in Savoy and returned to Berry in France to live with her mother.

== Countess consort of Armagnac ==
Her second marriage was to Bernard VII of Armagnac. Their marriage contract is dated on 2 December 1393. They had the following children:

- Bonne of Armagnac (1395 – 1435); married Charles, Duke of Orléans.
- John IV of Armagnac (1396 – 1450); married (1) Blanche of Brittany (2) Isabella d' Évreux
- Marie of Armagnac (1397 – died young).
- Bernard of Armagnac (1400 – 1462), Count of Pardiac; married Eleanor of Bourbon-La Marche.
- Anne of Armagnac (1402 – bef. 1473); married Charles II of Albret.
- Joan of Armagnac (1403 – died young).
- Beatrice of Armagnac (1406 – died young).

== Sources ==
- Samaran, Charles (1905). "De quelques manuscrits ayant appartenu à Jean d'Armagnac" (PDF). Bibliothèque de l'École des Chartes Année. 66 (1).
- Schnerb, Bertrand (2005). "Un Seigneur Auvergnat a la Cour de Bourgogne: Renaud II, Vicomte de Murat (1405-1420)". Annuaire-Bulletin de la Société de l'Histoire de France Nuaire-Bulletin de la Société de l'Histoire de France.
- Vaughan, Richard (2002). Philip the Bold: The Formation of the Burgundian State. Boydell Press.

Preceded by Bonne of Bourbon	Countess of Savoy; 1383–1391	Succeeded by Mary of Burgundy
