= Charles I d'Albret =

Constable of France under Charles VI of France

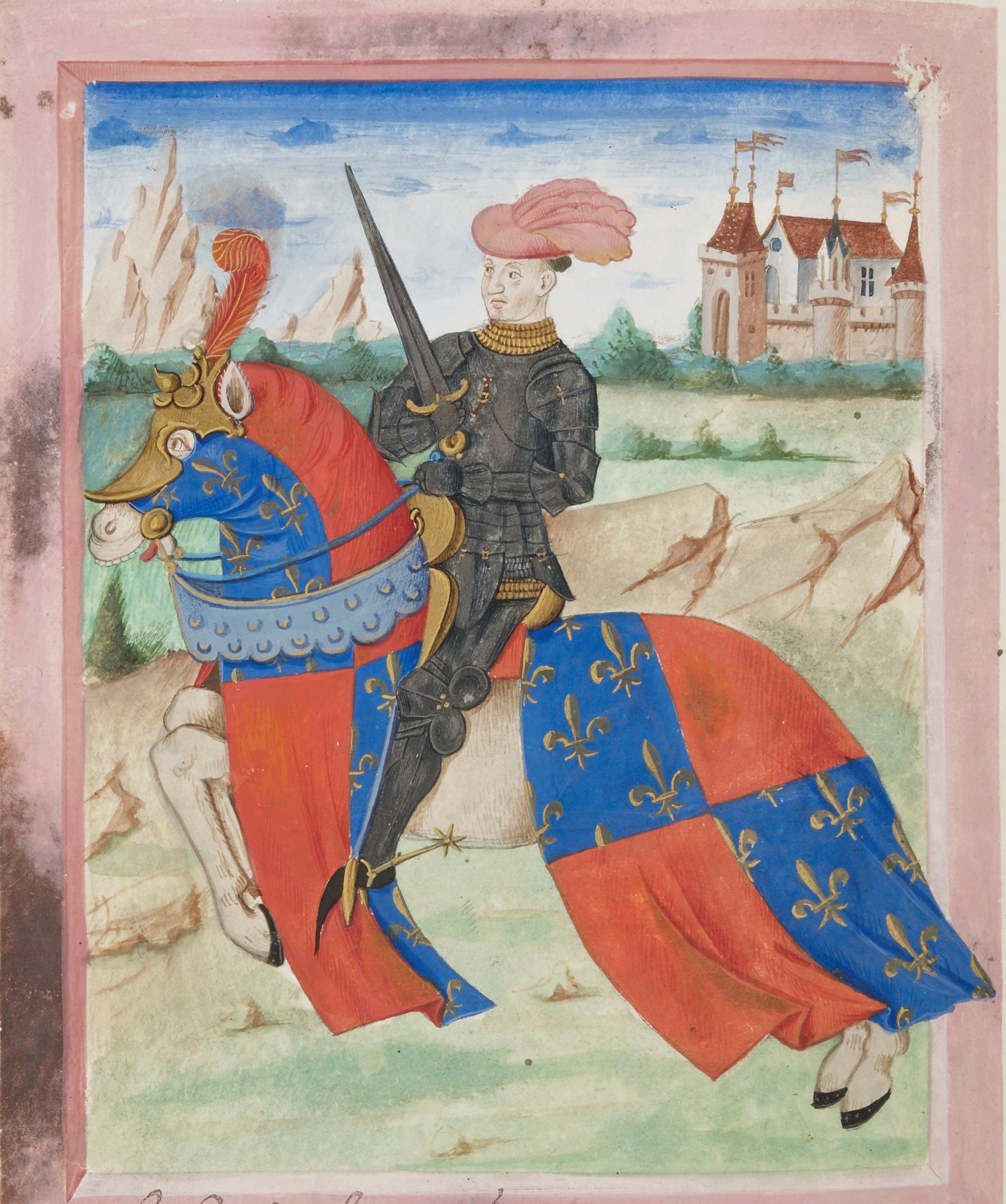
- Charles I d'Albret
- Predecessor: Arnaud Amanieu, Lord of Albret
- Successor: Charles II d'Albret
- Born: December 1368
- Died: 25 October 1415 (aged 46); Azincourt, France
- Buried: Vieil-Hesdin, France
- Noble family: Albret
- Spouse: Marie de Sully
- Issue: Jeanne d'Albret, Countess of Foix; Charles II, Lord of Albret; Guillaume, Lord of Orval; Jean d'Albret; Catherine d'Albret
- Father: Arnaud Amanieu, Lord of Albret
- Mother: Margaret of Bourbon

Coat of arms of Charles I

Charles I d'Albret (December 1368 – 25 October 1415) was the Lord of Albret from 1401 to 1415 and the Constable of France from 1402 until 1411, and again from 1413 until 1415. He was also the co-commander of the French army at the Battle of Agincourt where he was killed by the English forces led by King Henry V.

== Biography ==
Charles was born into an old Gascon family, the son of Arnaud Amanieu, Lord of Albret, and Margaret of Bourbon. He served under Bertrand du Guesclin as a young man and fought at the battle of Roosebeke. He was made the Constable of France by King Charles VI in 1403, but dismissed his constableship to Waleran III, Count of Ligny and Saint-Pol when the Burgundian faction gained power at court in 1411. He was restored to his office in 1413 when the Armagnac faction regained power. An important figure at the French court, he is the subject of two of Christine de Pizan's Autres Ballades (#2 and #3).

Although nominal commander of the French army in the Agincourt campaign together with Marshal Boucicaut, the two professional soldiers could not exercise effective control over the higher-ranking French nobles on the day of the battle. Constable d'Albret led the vanguard and died suffocated in the mud at Agincourt during the battle on 25 October 1415, against the English troops led by King Henry V. He was interred at the Friary church in Vieil-Hesdin.

== Family ==
Charles married Marie de Sully, daughter of Louis de Sully and Isabel de Craon, on 27 January 1400 and had issue:

- Jeanne d'Albret (1403–1433), married in 1422 John I, Count of Foix. She was his second wife; the only one of his three wives who bore him issue.
- Charles II d'Albret (1407–1471), married Anne of Armagnac (born 1402), the daughter of Bernard VII of Armagnac, Count of Charolais and Bonne of Berry
- Guillaume d'Albret, Lord of Orval, died at the Battle of the Herrings in 1429, no issue
- Jean d'Albret, died without issue
- Catherine d'Albret, married Charles de Montagu

== See also ==
- House of Albret

== Bibliography ==
- Biu, Hélène (2002). "Du panégyrique à l'histoire : l'archiviste Michel de Bernis, chroniqueur des comtes de Foix (1445)". Bibliothèque de l'École des chartes (in French). 160 (2): 385–473. doi:10.3406/bec.2002.451098.
- Bradbury, Jim (2004). The Routledge Companion to Medieval Warfare. Routledge.
- Chattaway, Carol Mary (2006). The Order of the Golden Tree: The Gift-giving Objectives of Duke Philip the Bold of Burgundy. Isd.
- Courroux, Pierre (2017). "How to become Armagnac? The case of Charles I d'Albret, 1368–1415". French History. 31 (2): 133–151. doi:10.1093/fh/crx017.
- Galand, Gérard (2005). Les seigneurs de Châteauneuf-sur-Sarthe en Anjou (in French). Cheminements.
- Lodge, Eleanor C. (1926). Gascony under English Rule. Methuen & Co. Ltd.
- Loehlin, James (2000). Shakespeare in Performance: Henry V. Manchester University Press.
- Wagner, John A., ed. (2006). "Albret, Charles, Lord of, Constable of France". Encyclopedia of the Hundred Years War. Greenwood Press.
- Willard, Charity Cannon (1998). "Christine on the Art of Warfare". In Desmond, Marilynn (ed.). Christine de Pizan and the Categories of Difference. University of Minnesota Press.

French nobility
Preceded by Arnaud Amanieu	Count of Dreux; 1401–1415	Succeeded by Charles II
Political offices
Preceded by Louis de Sancerre	Constable of France (Armagnac); 1404–1415; Disputed by Waleran III, Count of Ligny (1411–1413)	Succeeded by Bernard VII of Armagnac
