= Stokvis =

Stokvis may refer to:

- South African hake (Merluccius capensis), a fish called "stokvis" in Afrikaans and Dutch
- Stockfish, a dried whitefish product

== People with the surname ==
- Anthony Marinus Hendrik Johan Stokvis (1855–1924), authority in chronology and genealogy
- Barend Joseph Stokvis (1834–1902), Dutch physiologist and physician
- Ruud Stokvis (born 1943), Dutch rower
