= Arnaud Amanieu d'Albret =

Original coat of arms of the lords and dukes of Albret.

Arnaud Amanieu (also Arnold and Amaneus, 4 August 1338–1401) was the Lord of Albret from 1358.

Amanieu held lands in Gascony which by the Treaty of Brétigny (1360) were obtained by Edward III of England. Edward III appointed his son Edward, the Black Prince Prince of Aquitaine and Gascony, and in 1363 Amanieu paid homage to the two Edwards. In 1368 Amanieu in a secret treaty switched his allegiance to Charles V of France.

== Biography ==
Arnaud Amanieu was the son of Bernard Ezi IV and Mathe of Armagnac.

In 1330, Edward III of England sent men to Gascony to negotiate with the nobles. Bernard Ezi IV attempted to arrange a marriage between Arnaud Amanieu and a daughter of Edmund of Woodstock, Earl of Kent but failed.

In 1363, Edward the Black Prince, then Prince of Aquitaine and Gascony, went to his province to procure the homage of his barons, chief among whom was Arnaud Amanieu. In the cathedral of Bordeaux on 9 July, the lord of Albret was the first to kneel sans belt and cap before the Prince and swear an oath of fealty (save his allegiance to the King of England), then to kiss a Bible and a cross, and finally to kiss the Prince on the mouth (a "holy kiss" signifying fellowship and peace). However, good relations did not last long between Lord and Prince.

In 1367, while preparing to cross the Pyrenees to join in the Castilian Civil War, Edward demanded a contingent from Arnaud Amanieu, but the forces requested were more than the lord of Albret could suffice. Arnaud Amanieu refused, causing the Black Prince to say:

The Sire d'Albret is a great lord indeed when he wishes to break the ordinance of my Council. By God, things shall not be as he thinks. Let him stay home if he likes, I can do without his thousand lances.

Edward's Council also declared a fouage, a new tax, which was bitterly resented by the great landholders. John I of Armagnac, Peter-Raymond II of Comminges, Roger Bernard of Périgord, and Arnaud Amanieu sent appeals to Charles V of France, appeals which are preserved to this day in the Archives Nationales in Paris. They addressed him as the "sovereign lord of the duchée de Guienne and the other lands baillées to the king of England by the treaty of peace". The king of France readily received the Gascon rebels into his fold and made Arnaud Amanieu Count of Dreux.

On 30 June 1368, after Arnaud Amanieu married Margaret of Bourbon, a secret treaty was signed between Charles V, Arnaud Amanieu, John, and Roger Bernard. Charles pledged aid in the event of war and he swore never to give up his claims of sovereignty over Gascony. The lords agreed to serve Charles—for pay—in Auvergne, Toulouse, Berry, and Touraine, and to take an oath to him. The fouage was remitted for the next decade, unless the barons chose to reimpose it on themselves. A body of lawyers and barons was called to decide the sovereignty question and they unanimously affirmed that Charles was sovereign over Gascony. Amanieu remained close to the French monarchy until his death in 1401.

== Family ==
His son, Charles I, became Constable of France.

== Bibliography ==
- Autrand, Françoise (1994). Charles V (in French). Fayard.
- Lodge, Eleanor C. (1926). Gascony under English Rule. London: Kennikat Press.
- Wagner, John A., ed. (2006). "Arnaud Amanieu, Lord of Albret". Encyclopedia of the Hundred Years War. Greenwood Press.
