= Bernard VII of Armagnac =

French noble (1360–1418)

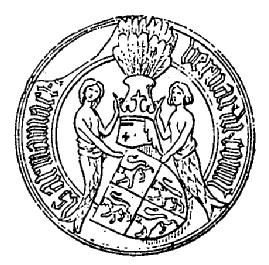
Seal of Bernard VII

Bernard VII (1360 – 12 June 1418) was Count of Armagnac and Constable of France. He was the son of John II, Count of Armagnac, and Jeanne de Périgord. He succeeded to Armagnac at the death of his brother, John III, in 1391. After prolonged fighting, he also became Count of Comminges in 1412.

When his brother, who claimed the Kingdom of Majorca, invaded northern Catalonia in late 1389 in an attempt to seize the kingdom's continental possessions (the County of Roussillon), Bernard commanded part of his forces.

Bernard's wife was Bonne, the daughter of John, Duke of Berry, and widow of Count Amadeus VII, Count of Savoy. He first gained influence at the French court when Louis I, Duke of Orléans, married Valentina Visconti, the daughter of Gian Galeazzo Visconti, Duke of Milan. Bernard's sister Beatrice married Valentina's brother Carlo.

After Louis' assassination in 1407, Armagnac remained attached to the cause of Orléans. He married his daughter Bonne to the young Charles I, Duke of Orléans in 1410. Bernard of Armagnac became the nominal head of the faction which opposed John the Fearless, Duke of Burgundy in the Armagnac–Burgundian Civil War, and the faction came to be called the "Armagnacs" as a consequence.

Armagnac was granted Constable of France in 1415 by King Charles VI, and was the head of the government of the Dauphin, the future King Charles VII, until the Burgundians led by captain Jean de Villiers invaded Paris on the night of 28–29 May 1418, he hid in his neighbor's house but was betrayed. On 12 June 1418, he was one of the first victims of the massacres, in which anywhere between 1,000 and 5,000 of his real or suspected followers were killed over a period of weeks throughout the summer.

== Children ==
Bernard and Bonne had:

- John IV, Count of Armagnac, married 1) Blanche of Brittany and 2) Isabella of Navarre
- Anne of Armagnac, married Charles II of Albret
- Bonne of Armagnac, married Charles, Duke of Orléans
- Bernard, Count of Pardiac, married Eleanor, heiress to La Marche

== Sources ==
- Harrington, David V. (1998). "Charles d'Orléans". The Middle Ages: Dictionary of World Biography. Vol. 2. Routledge. ISBN 0-89356-314-5.
- Lodge, Eleanor C. (1926). Gascony under English Rule. Methuen & Co. Ltd.
- Samaran, Charles (1905). "De quelques manuscrits ayant appartenu à Jean d'Armagnac" (PDF). Bibliothèque de l'École des Chartes Année. 66 (1).
- Schnerb, Bertrand (2005). "Un Seigneur auvergnat à la Cour de Bourgogne: Renaud II, Vicomte de Murat (1405–1420)". Annuaire-Bulletin de la Société de l'histoire de France.
- Sizer, Michael (2007). "The Calamity of Violence: Reading the Paris Massacres of 1418". Proceedings of the Western Society for French History. 35. Michigan Publishing.
- Vaughan, Richard (2009). John the Fearless. The Boydell Press. ISBN 978-0851159164.

Preceded by John III of Armagnac	Count of Armagnac; 1391–1418	Succeeded by John IV of Armagnac
Preceded by John III of Armagnac	Count of Fézensac; 1391–1418	Succeeded by John IV of Armagnac
Preceded by John III of Armagnac	Count of Rodez; 1391–1418	Succeeded by John IV of Armagnac
Preceded by John III of Armagnac	Count of Pardiac; 1391–1418	Succeeded by John IV of Armagnac
