= Labroquère =

- Commune
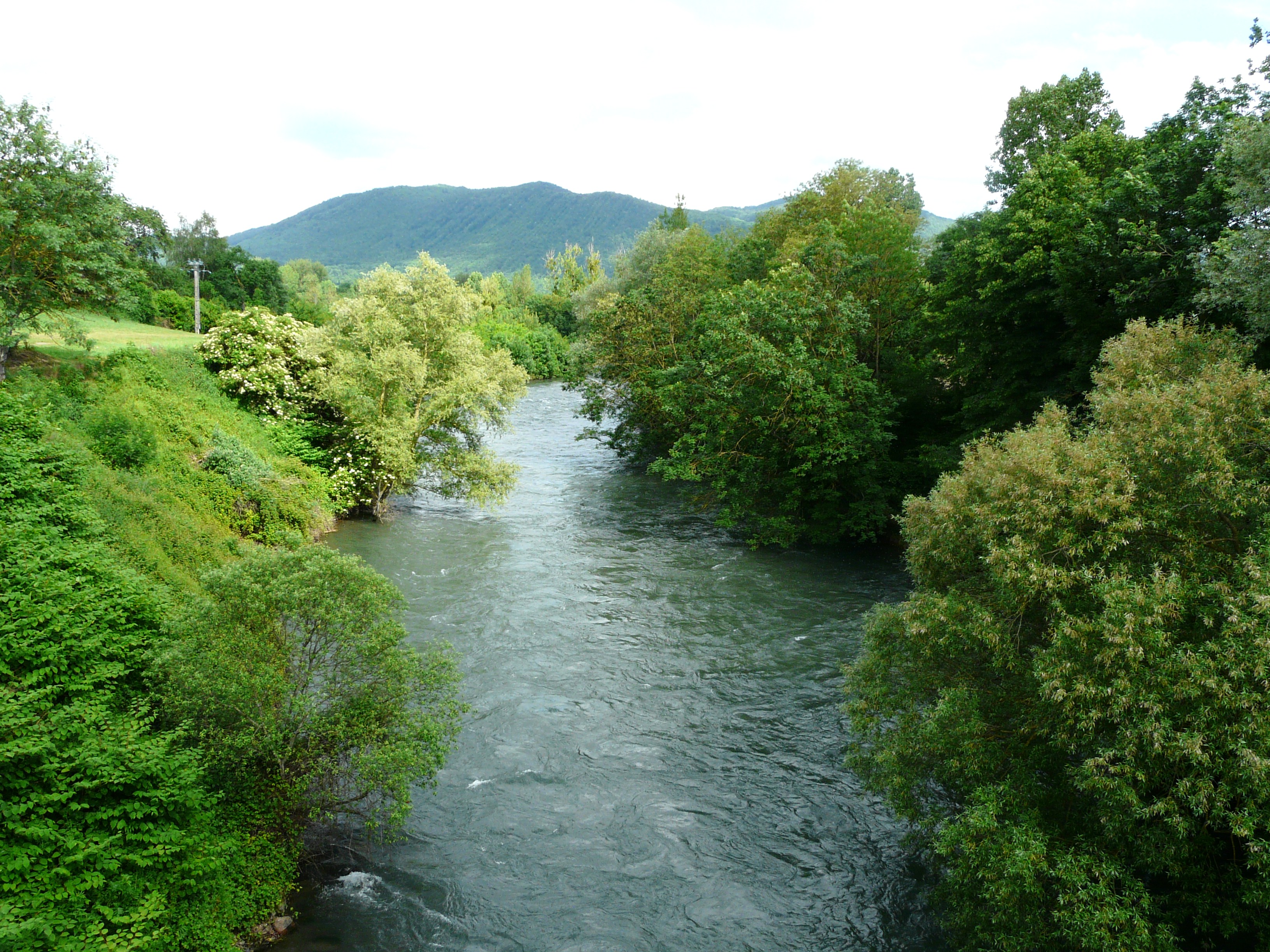
- The Garonne
- Location of Labroquère
- Location within France Location within Occitanie
- Coordinates: 43°02′22″N 0°35′34″E
- Country: France
- Region: Occitania
- Department: Haute-Garonne
- Arrondissement: Saint-Gaudens
- Canton: Bagnères-de-Luchon

Government
  - Mayor (2020–2026): Alain Larqué
- Area^{1}: 4.37 km^{2} (1.69 sq mi)
- Elevation: 460 m (1,510 ft)
- Highest elevation: 690 m (2,260 ft)
- Lowest elevation: 422 m (1,385 ft)
- Population (2023): 324
  - Density: 74.1/km^{2} (192/sq mi)
- Time zone: UTC+01:00 (CET)
  - Summer (DST): UTC+02:00 (CEST)
- INSEE/Postal code: 31255 /31510
- ^{1} French Land Register data, which excludes lakes, ponds, glaciers > 1 km^{2} (0.386 sq mi or 247 acres) and river estuaries.

Labroquère (French pronunciation: [labʁɔkɛʁ]; Occitan: Era Broquèra) is a commune in the Haute-Garonne department in southwestern France.

The troubadour Amanieu de la Broqueira was from here.

== Population ==
Historical population
Year	Pop.	±% p.a.
1968	288	—
1975	279	−0.45%
1982	218	−3.46%
1990	271	+2.76%
1999	269	−0.08%
2007	298	+1.29%
2012	318	+1.31%
2017	323	+0.31%
2023	324	+0.05%
Source: INSEE

== See also ==
Communes of the Haute-Garonne department
