= Amanieu de la Broqueira =

Gascon troubadour

Amanieu de la Broqueira (fl. 1188) was a Gascon troubadour. His name suggests he was from Labroquère, near Saint-Bertrand-de-Comminges. He wrote two cansos that have been preserved in the 14th-century troubadour chansonnier E (BN f.f. 1749):

- Mentre que·l talans mi cocha ["While the desire is pressing me"] (PC 21,1)
- Quan reverdejon li conderc ["When the countryside turns green again"] (PC 21,2)

Along with the works of Guilhem d'Anduza and Guilhem Raimon de Gironella, Amanieu's songs are found only in chansonnier E, which has a high proportion of Gascon, Catalan and Langedocien composers. For reasons unknown, the chansonnier gives Amanieu's name as Ameus.

In Quan reverdejon li conderc, Amanieu gives his own name as Amaneus Aureilla, which is perhaps a family name or else indicates that he came from Aureilhan. Towards the end of the song, Amanieu laments that he did not send it by one of his preferred jongleurs, Porta-joia d'Engolmes from the Angoumois and Paire de Bodeles from the Bordelais. Porta-joia from Angoumois is probably the same person as the jongleur Porta-joia l'escassier (i.e., he who walks on crutches) mentioned by Raimon de Durfort. "Porta-joia" is a nickname meaning "he who carries joy". This places Amanieu's poetic activity in the last third of the twelfth century.

Mentre que·l talans mi cocha has a refrain at verses 2 and 9 and might be classified as a retroencha.

Besides the information gleaned from his poems and the chansonnier, one contemporary document mentions him. In 1188, Amanieu was one of the witnesses of a donation of Count Bernard IV of Armagnac to the cathedral of Auch. His name was spelled "Amaneus de Broquera".

== Bibliography ==
- Chambers, Frank M. (1985). An Introduction to Old Provençal Versification. Philadelphia: American Philosophical Society.
- Guida, Saverio (1999). "Cartulari e trovatori: 1. Arnaut Guilhem de Marsan, 2. Amanieu de la Broqueira, 3. Guilhem Peire de Cazals, 4. Amanieu de Sescas". Cultura Neolatina. 59: 71–127.
- Guida, Saverio; Larghi, Gerardo (2013). Dizionario biografico dei trovatori. Mucchi Editore.
- Jeanroy, Alfred, ed. (1923). Jongleurs et troubadours gascons des XII^{e} et XIII^{e} siècles. Paris: Honoré Champion.
- Paden, William D. (1984). "The Role of the Joglar in Troubadour Lyric-Poetry". In P. T. Noble; L. M. Paterson (eds.). Chrétien de Troyes and the Troubadours: Essays in Memory of the Late Leslie Topsfield. Cambridge: Cambridge University Press. pp. 90–111.
- "Périodiques". Romania. 120 (479–80): 562–65. 2002. (Review of Cultura Neolatina Issue 59 (1999)).
- Viel, Riccardo, ed. (2011). Troubadours mineurs gascons du XII^{e} siècle: Alegret, Marcoat, Amanieu de la Broqueira, Peire de Valeria, Gausbert Amiel. Paris: Honoré Champion.
- Zufferey, François (1987). Recherches linguistiques sur les chansonniers provençaux. Geneva: Librairie Droz.
