= John II of Armagnac =

French nobleman (1333–1384)

Jean II, the Hunchback, (1333 – 26 May 1384), Count of Armagnac, of Fézensac, Rodez (1371–1384) and Count of Charolais (1364–1384), Viscount Lomagne and Auvillars, he was the son of John I, Count of Armagnac, of Fezensac and Rodez, Viscount Lomagne and Auvillars and Beatrix de Clermont, great-granddaughter of Louis IX of France.

During the life of his father, he bore the title of lord, and subsequently, Count of Charolais, which he had received from his mother. Also, during his life, the government of Languedoc was entrusted to him.

== Hundred Years War ==
Since 1351, he actively participated in the battles of the Hundred Years' War, fighting under the command of his father, or for his lord, Philip II, Duke of Burgundy, or John, Duke of Berry, or the king of France.

As Lord of Charolais, he was not required, according to the terms of the Treaty of Brétigny, to pay a humiliating tribute to those he had fought for several years; Edward III, king of England, and his son, The Black Prince, Prince of Wales. But it was the first and only time, to support the call from King Charles V against the actions of the Prince of Wales, which ultimately led to the liberation of Biscay from the English occupation.

== Peace with De Foix ==
In 1379, he concluded with Gaston III Phoebus, a peace consolidated by the marriage of his daughter, Beatrice, with the son of Gaston Phoebus. This ended a quarrel, which for 89 years had set the two most powerful families in the south of France against each other.

== Trial ==
Through the intrigues of the Duke of Berry, against his brother, the Duke of Burgundy, Jean was summoned to court to defend himself against these charges:

- Procuring an alliance with England;
- Being in league with free companies;
- Have tried, in concert with the Count of Foix, to share Languedoc.

John never stood trial, having died at Avignon in 1384.

== Marriage & children ==
On 21 November 1359, he married Jeanne de Périgord, daughter of Roger Bernard, Count of Périgord, and Eleanor de Vendôme. They had three children:

- John III, (1359 to 1391), Count of Armagnac
- Bernard VII, (1363 to 1418), Count of Armagnac, Constable of France
- Beatrice (c1365), married in 1379 to Gaston de Foix († 1381), son of Gaston III, Count of Foix, and 27 January 1382 to Carlo Visconti, lord of Parma, son of Bernabò Visconti and Beatrice Regina della Scala.

Jean also had several illegitimate children:

- Jean, Bastard of Armagnac († 8 October 1409), bishop of Mende and archbishop of Auch.
- Bertrand, Bastard of Armagnac († 1403), master of the Château de Villiers in Armagnac.

== Sources ==
- Bartlett, Kenneth R. (2013). A Short History of the Italian Renaissance. University of Toronto Press.
- Black, Jane (2009). Absolutism in Renaissance Milan: Plenitude of Power Under the Visconti and the Sforza 1329-1535. Oxford University Press.
- Lodge, Eleanor Constance (1926). Gascony Under English Rule. Methuen & Co. Ltd.14
- The Americana: a universal reference library, Vol.2, Ed. Frederick Converse Beach, George Edwin Rines, 1912.
- Histoire générale de Languedoc, Vol.3, Ed. Claude de Vic, Joseph Vaissete, Alexandre Du Mège, 1841.

Preceded by John I	Count of Armagnac; 1373–1384	Succeeded by John III
