= John III of Armagnac =

French nobleman (1359–1391)

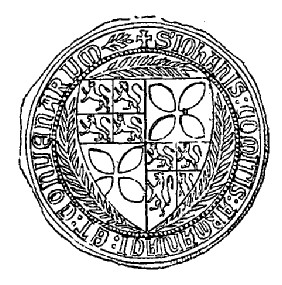
Seal of John III of Armagnac.jpg

Jean III of Armagnac (1359 – July 25, 1391) was Count of Armagnac and also of Fézensac and Rodez from 1384 until his death. He was the son of Jean II of Armagnac and Joan of Périgord.

In 1390, Jean claimed the Kingdom of Majorca, but was overcome by the troops of John I of Aragon in a battle near Navata. John consequently led military actions in Roussillon.

In 1391, he had to leave for Italy in order to go to the assistance of Charles Visconti, Lord of Parma and husband of his sister, Beatrice of Armagnac. Visconti was in conflict with his acquisitive cousin Gian Galeazzo Visconti, later the duke of Milan, whose ambition was to control the whole of northern Italy.

His army was attacked and decisively beaten by that of Gian Galeazzo Visconti as it passed through Alessandria in Piedmont. John was killed in the battle.

== Family ==
On May 14, 1378, Jean married Margaret (1363–1443), countess of Comminges (1363–1443). They had two daughters:

- Joan, who married Guillaume-Amanieu de Madaillan (1375–1414) in 1409.
- Margaret, who married William II of Narbonne in 1415. He was killed in the battle of Verneuil, on August 14, 1424).

== Sources ==
- Allmand, C. T.; Coopland, George William (1976). War, Literature, and Politics in the Late Middle Ages. Liverpool University Press.
- Lodge, Eleanor C. (1926). Gascony under English Rule. Methuen & Co. Ltd.

Preceded by John II	Count of Armagnac; 1384–1391	Succeeded by Bernard VII
