= Jean I of Albret =

- Born: 1425
- Died: 3 January 1468 (aged 42–43)
- Noble family: Albret
- Spouse: Catherine de Rohan
- Issue: Alain I of Albret; Mary of Albret; Louise of Albret
- Father: Charles II of Albret
- Mother: Anne of Armagnac

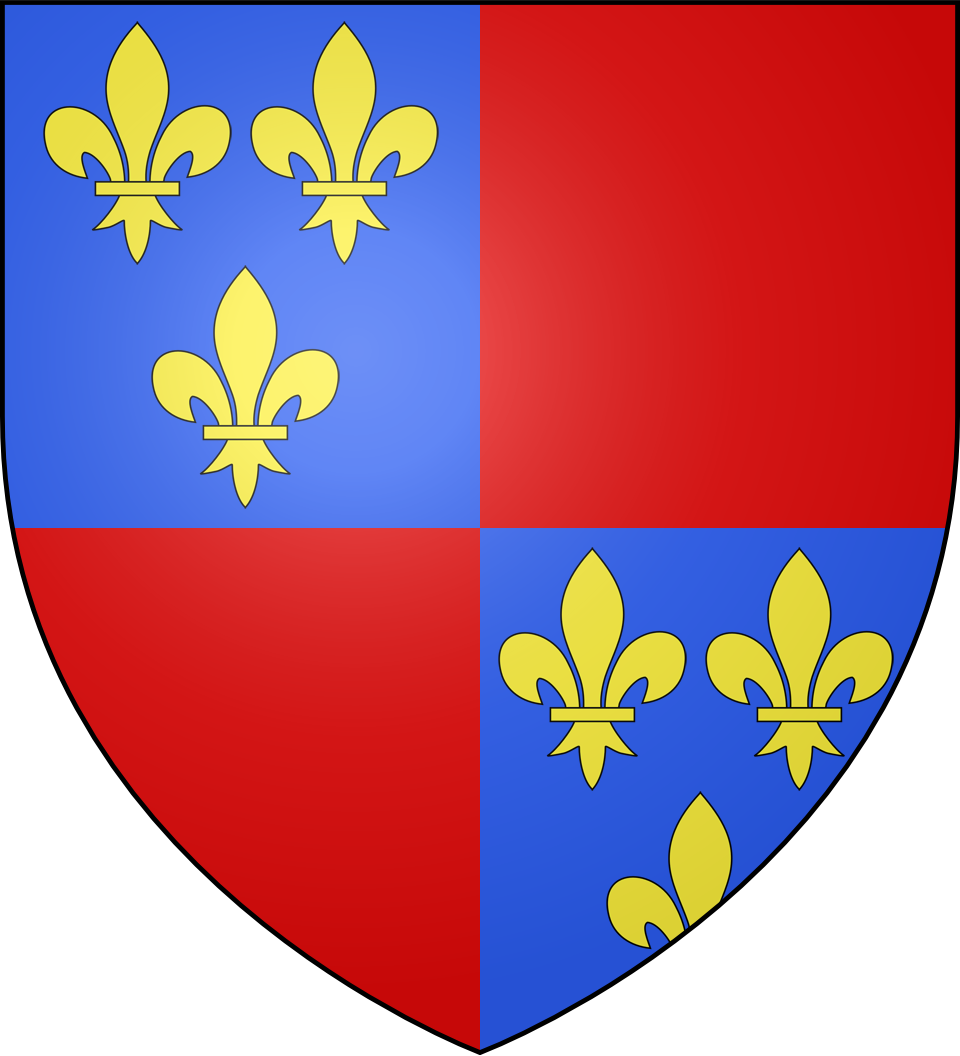
Albret coat of arms

Jean I of Albret (1425 – 3 January 1468), 15th Lord of Albret, was a Viscount of Tartas.

== Life ==
He was the eldest son of Charles II of Albret, Count of Dreux and of Anne of Armagnac. As he predeceased his father, he never ruled Albret.

He married Catherine de Rohan (1425–1471), daughter of Alain IX de Rohan and Marguerite de Dreux, dame de Guillac. They had 3 children :

- Alain I of Albret, 16th Lord of Albret, married in 1470 with Frances, Countess of Périgord
- Mary of Albret, married in 1480 with Bonfile del Giudice, count of Castres
- Louise of Albret ( – 8 September 1494), married in 1480 with Jacques, Lord of Estouteville (4 December 1448 – 12 March 1489), and mistress of John II, Duke of Bourbon

== Sources ==
- de Carvalho, Helena Avelar (2021). An Astrologer at Work in Late Medieval France: The Notebooks of S. Belle. Brill.
- Luchaire, Achille (1974). Alain Le Grand Sire D'albret. Slatkine.
