= John I of Armagnac =

Count of Armagnac from 1319 to 1373

Jean I of Armagnac
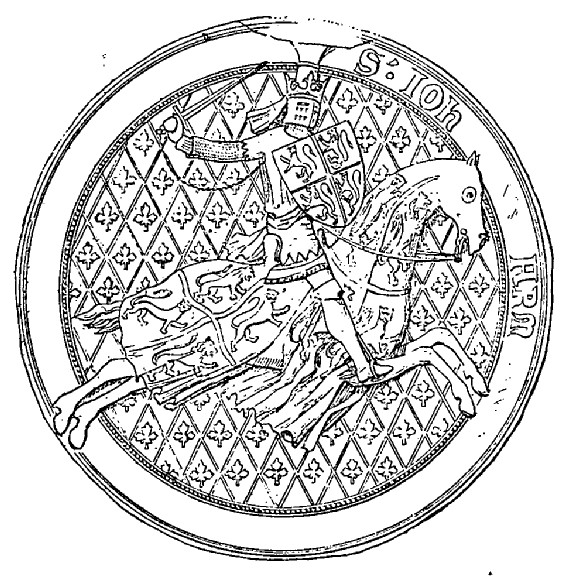
- Born: 1311
- Died: 1373 (aged 61–62)
- Noble family: Armagnac
- Spouses: Reine de Got; Beatrice of Clermont
- Issue: Jean II, Count of Armagnac; Joanna of Armagnac; Martha of Armagnac
- Father: Bernard VI of Armagnac
- Mother: Cecilia Rodez

Jean I of Armagnac (French: Jean d’Armagnac; 1311–1373), son of Bernard VI and Cecilia Rodez, was Count of Armagnac from 1319 to 1373. In addition to Armagnac he controlled territory in Quercy, Rouergue and Gévaudan. He was the count who initiated the 14th century expansion of the county.

== Hundred Years War ==
In the summer of 1337, with the outbreak of the Hundred Years War, he provided a contingent of 6,000 men for the campaign of Raoul I of Eu, Constable of France, in Gascony.

In July 1338, he attended a general conference at La Réole, but before achieving anything of note, John and his fellow captain-general in the south, Gaston II, Count of Foix, were called north to help counter the expected invasion of Northern France by King Edward III of England. As this threat grew weaker the French offensive in the south was resumed with the siege of Penne-d'Agenais in November by John of Bohemia and the Count of Foix. Jean provided 1,200 men for this siege, which ended with the surrender of the town, though not the castle.

Through these early years of the war, the Gaston II, Count of Foix had conducted a series of independent campaigns which allowed him to expand his personal territory into the Adour valley and the Landes. This expansion brought him into conflict with Jean. Just after his return from the north at the end of 1339, Jean attacked Miramont-Sensacq, a small town he laid claim to, but which was situated in territory dominated by the Count of Foix. This started a short but violent private war, which was ended by the town taken into royal custody.

This quarrel caused Jean to reconsider his allegiance to the French Crown. In May 1340, he went to join King Philip VI of France's northern army again, and he left Bernard Ezi IV, Lord of Albret with documents stating terms under which terms he would be willing to do homage to Edward III. As compensation for the territory he expected to lose once he switched allegiance Armagnac demanded several towns held by the King of France, chief among them Montréal, Mézin and Condom. Of these the English only succeeded in taking and holding Mézin. The negotiations therefore came to an end and Jean remained a vassal of Philip VI.

In the north, the situation had improved for the English with their naval victory in the Battle of Sluys. Edward III's next step was an attack on Saint-Omer by his Flemish allies led by Robert III of Artois. However Robert III failed completely in masking his intentions. This allowed Philip VI to dispatch John of Armagnac to reinforce the garrison already present there under Eudes IV, Duke of Burgundy. On 26 July what begun as an unauthorized attack on the enemy lines by some French knights developed into a major battle as the Duke of Burgundy decided to sally forth in strength. During the Battle of Saint-Omer the Count of Armagnac with his retinue of 300 heavy cavalry succeeded in breaking the Flemish left and then in the following pursuit causing several thousand casualties. Faced with the loss of the bulk of his army Robert of Artois was forced to retreat from the city in disorder.

Meanwhile, Edward III had with his own army laid siege to the city of Tournai. The siege dragged out and in September Philip VI marched to confront him. The result was not battle, but negotiations in which Jean of Armagnac took part as one of five French plenipotentiaries. The negotiations resulted in a truce concluded on 24 September. The lull in the fighting, except for an interlude in 1342, was to last until 1345.

In August 1345, Armagnac was laying siege to the Anglo-Gascon garrison at Monchamp outside Condom when Henry of Gosmont, Earl of Lancaster arrived in Bordeaux. Derby's opened his campaign with the capture of the garrison town of Bergerac by storm. This caused major shock to at the French court as no significant English army was expected in the south. Armagnac helped shore up the French position by gathering some of the survivors and retreating to Périgueux. Lancaster moved to surround Périgueux, but did not have the strength to capture the city and in October he was forced to withdraw with the arrival of a force commanded by Louis of Poitiers, Count of Valentinois.

In September 1346, following the French defeat at the Battle of Crécy and the beginning of the English Siege of Calais, Armagnac was appointed royal lieutenant in the south-west. However, due to the overall worsening French situation he was left with few troops and little money. He was therefore unable to stop Lancaster neither from consolidating English gains in the south nor from launching a major raid into Poitou.

Prior to John's lieutenancy in Languedoc, it was common for tax revenues raised in the southwest to be used to finance the war in other parts of France. Inhabitants of the region resented this practice, since they were worried about their own protection. John's lieutenancy was marked by an extreme degree of independence. Once he took office, he vowed to prevent Languedoc tax revenues from being spent on northern campaigns. While the man was overall a somewhat talented commander, he was strongly criticized for his reluctance to meet the English in battle.

In October–December 1355, Edward the Black Prince despoiled the French countryside on a massive scale with an army roughly 5000 strong. John, leading his own army, remained in the vicinity of The Black Prince's troops during much of this campaign, but he dared not confront the English in battle. This was not a decision made strictly due to cowardice. Rather, it was a strategic decision, though perhaps a poorly calculated one. John had seen the disasters that had befallen French at Crécy in 1346, and at Bergerac and Auberoche a decade earlier. All of these battles resulted in heavy losses for the French. Worse still, many prominent French noblemen were captured by the English at all three of these places and later ransomed, raising large amounts of money to fund the English war effort. With these catastrophes in mind, John proved extremely reluctant to risk another disaster by confronting the Black Prince on the battlefield. Regardless of his reasoning, John of Armagnac's inability to act in the face of the English threat embarrassed the French king (John II at the time), for whom he was acting as lieutenant.

John died in 1373.

== Marriages and children ==
Armagnac married Reine de Got (d.1325), a niece of Pope Clement V, they had no children.

Armagnac later married Beatrice of Clermont. They had:

- Jean II of Armagnac (1333–1384)
- Joanna, married John, Duke of Berry in 1360.
- Martha, married John I of Aragon

== Sources ==
- Henneman, John Bell (1996). Olivier de Clisson and Political Society in France Under Charles V and Charles VI. University of Pennsylvania Press.
- Meiss, Millard (1969). French Painting in the Time of Jean De Berry: The Late Fourteenth Century and the Patronage of the Duke. Vol. 1. Phaidon.
- Vincent, Catherine (2004). Fiat lux lumière et luminaires dans la vie religieuse en Occident du XIIIe siècle au début du XVIe siècle (in French). CERF.
- The Encyclopædia Britannica, Vol.3, Ed. Hugh Chisholm, 1911.
- Tout, Thomas Frederick (1914). The Place of the Reign of Edward II in English History. Manchester University Press.

== Fictional depictions ==
Jean I of Armagnac features in the medieval series, Lions and Lilies Books 1, 2 and 4 – The Lily and the Lion, The Order of the Lily and The Traitor's Noose by Catherine A. Wilson and Catherine T. Wilson.

John I of Armagnac House of Armagnac Born: 1311 Died: 16 May 1373
| Preceded by Bernard VI | Count of Armagnac; 1319–1373 | Succeeded by John II |
