= Château de Sully-sur-Loire =

Castle made into a residence in Centre-Val de Loire, France

Coordinates: 47.7677°N 2.3752°E

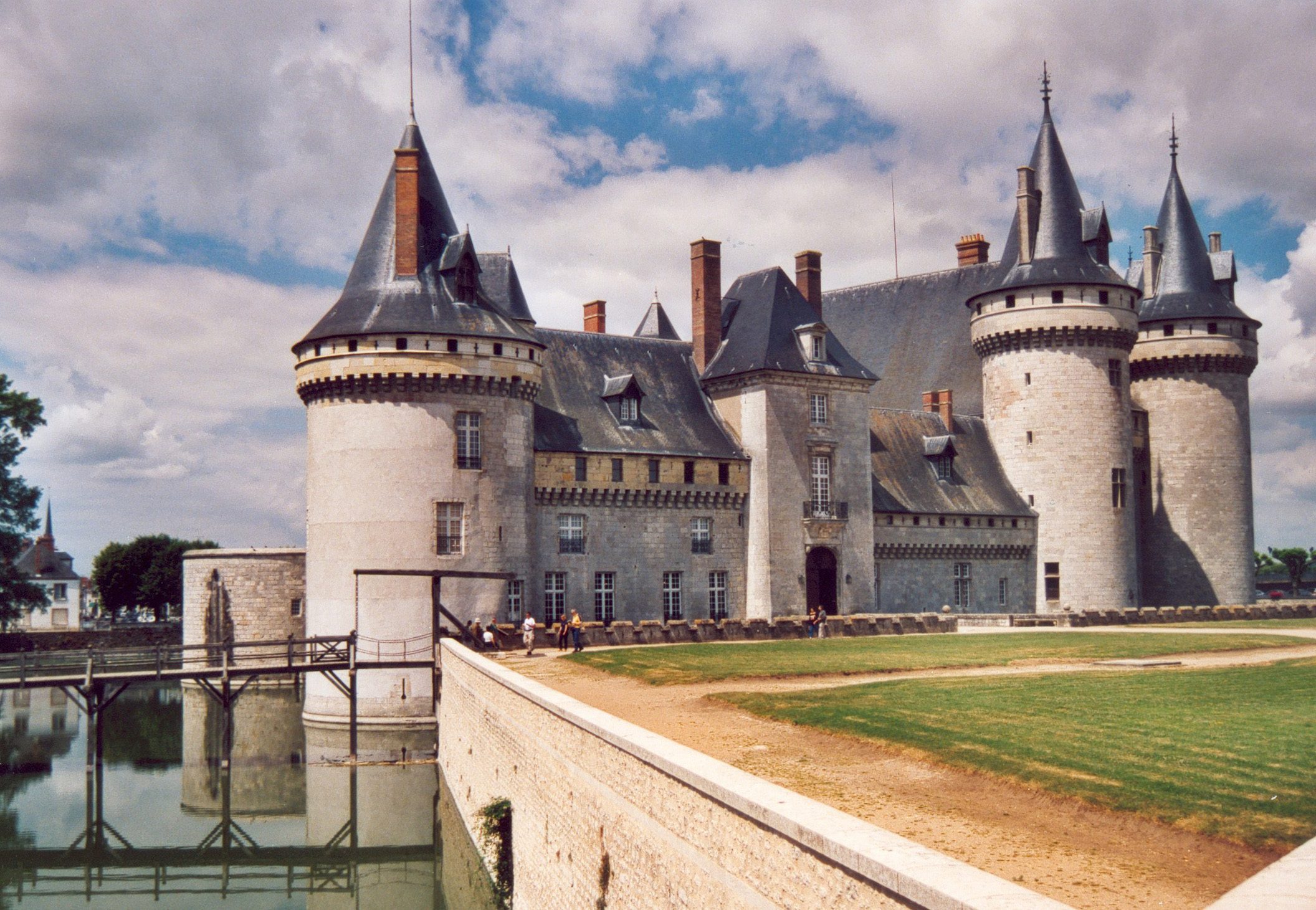
The Château de Sully's Petit Chateau to the left and Keep on the right

The Château de Sully-sur-Loire (French pronunciation: [ʃɑto də syli syʁ lwaʁ]; English: Castle of Sully-sur-Loire) is a castle, converted to a palatial seigneurial residence, situated in the commune of Sully-sur-Loire, Centre-Val de Loire, France.

The château was the seat of the Duke de Sully, King Henry IV of France's minister Maximilien de Béthune (1560–1641), and the later dukes of Sully. It is a château-fort, a true castle, built to control one of the few sites where the Loire can be forded.

== History ==
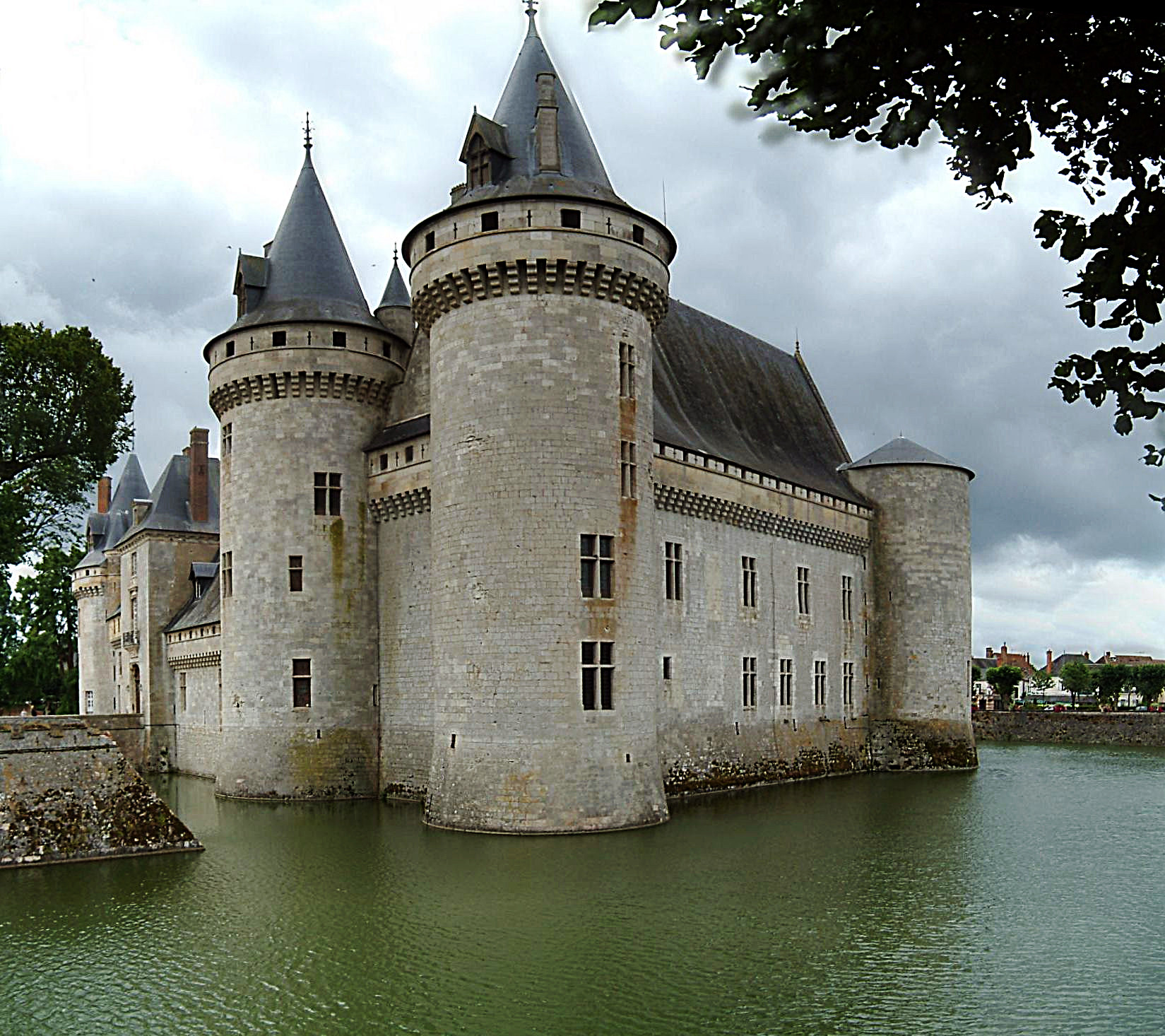
Sully Keep rises directly from its moat.

=== The Original Site Layout ===
The Chateau of Sully Sur Loire sits on the south side at a natural fording point of the Loire, at the confluence of the Loire and the River Sange. Set into the river north of the southern fording point were three grouped islands that were only submerged in the worst Loire floods. It is on these three islands that the Chateau of Sully was built. The Northwestern island is now taken up with the main keep, the ditch that ran between it and the southwestern island is now filled in. This southwestern island holds the Inner Courtyard with defence towers, galleries and later residences. The Outer Courtyard, taking up the Eastern island has been regularised and, although now empty, it held various buildings over history. The dikes that surround the Chateau and town have been built in an attempt to limit flood damage, the chateau was originally open to the Loire. North of the crossing, the village of Saint Père sits on a small mound; to the south, another knoll carries the former parish church of Saint Germain, both sitting high enough to protect them from floods. The Church of Saint Germain is the base site of the port and village of Sully, controlling the crossroads of several routes.

=== First Historical Reference ===
There is no evidence of Roman or Gallic habitation at this point but at Bonnie, a short distance north are the remains of an important Gallo-Romanesque settlement. Later there is mention of a fording point during the Viking incursions in the 9th century. At the same time there are references to the Lords of Sully. The first references in documentation defines a "castrum soliacense" in 1102, the description indicating a building and family holding a certain status. The fortress at Sully was their most northern holding. Others were located around Solonge and Berry.

=== Later History ===
A widely documented incident in 1218, regarding the excessive levee of taxes by the Lord resulted in the King Philip Augustus seizing the lordship and constructed a cylindrical keep in the Outer Courtyard directly in front of the Lords keep (where the main keep still stands). This was a common strategy of the king. The Lord of Sully had to pay restitution to his suzerain, the Bishop of Orleans and recompense the king for the price of the Tower before he could regain his title. The Keep also had its own moat and defences and joined the church of Saint Ythier in the Outer Courtyard that had been built in the 11th century along with other undefined abbey and domestic buildings.

=== The First Accounts ===
Accounts started to appear in the 14th century due to an order by Charles V of France for lords and towns to rebuild and repair their defences after the Peace of Bretigny. The king supplied money for this work between 1357 and 1360, the receipts therefore resulting in increased information on building stock. Furthermore, in 1363 there was a catastrophic storm in the area that damaged the town, fortress and bridge.

The flooding of the Loire and its habit of backing up along the river Sange and Ru d'Oison (that runs around the west of the town and joins the Sange at its confluence) meant that dikes had been built up along the Loire, in front of the fortress and the Sange. The Ru d'Oison was opened up west of the town into a reservoir, that was also stocked with fish. Here, too, dikes were raised against the town walls. The two rivers were run into a mill race sited downstream of the fortress and under the Sully Bridge. The Bridge was destroyed by 1363 and only the section running from the town gate to the Loire dikes remained (where the bridge head now stands); the Sange and Oison ran under it to reach the mill race and Loire.

The Fortress was described as having a keep on the northwest island, damaged in the storm and requiring work, a palisaded fence surrounding the southwest island with a stone gate tower controlling the crossing to the eastern Outer Courtyard (the same or an older version of that now present) and the keep of Phillip and the Church of St Ythier both in the Outer Courtyard. There is also mention of stables, work sheds, ovens and other domestic buildings. A wooden residential building was built in 1377 and in 1382 another defence tower was built facing the town (actual locations unknown). In 1383 two corner towers were built on in the Outer Courtyard. Finally the islands were connected by drawbridges and the surrounding palisades extended over the moats to join the three together. There were two access bridges: the first, the Priests Bridge from the Outer Courtyard to the town and the second from the Outer Courtyard to the land upstream that ran between the Loire and the Sange, that later became the gardens.

=== The New Keep ===
Guy de La Trémoille married the last remaining Sully, Marie de Sully, Princess of Boisbelle, and bought back the estate after it had been absorbed by the crown when the last remaining male Lord (Louis) had died. He undertook the construction of the new keep, flanked by four towers and a south facing entrance flanked by two towers containing a drawbridge across to the Inner Courtyard, beginning in 1395. He died in 1396 in the crusade of Nicopolis. His wife, Marie finished the keep, although the two western towers were never completed and were left empty.

In 1401 Marie also refurbished 'a house' within the compound, thought to be that built in 1377 and now called the Petit Chateau, sitting between the Gate Tower and the Sange Tower in the Inner Courtyard.

=== Georges and Joan of Arc ===
Guy de La Trémoïlle's son Georges was chamberlain and favourite of Charles VII of France. In June 1429 he entertained the king and Joan of Arc at Sully as they carried out a campaign to recapture the bridging points of the Loire, in Meung 14/15 June and Beagency 17 June and were heading for Gien.

Joan returned briefly to Sully in March 1430: By then she was being closely watched as she had broken the truce between Charles and the Burgundians after his coronation in July 1429 at Reims, by attacking Paris. She joined Charles at Sully Sur Loire in March at the family castle of her chief detractor, George de La Trémoille. She left without the king's consent and was captured whilst on her way to Compiegne 23 May 1430

=== Maximilien de Béthune ===
Claude de La Trémoille converted to the Huguenot religion and fought in the army of King Henry IV of France (then Henry of Navarre). He sold the estate to Maximilien de Béthune in 1602. Known as "Grand Sully", the duke was also a Huguenot, as well as a close friend and ally of Henry. In 1606, Henry created him 1st Duke of Sully. The Religious Wars of the time made Maximilien cautious: he had the Catholic St Ythien church (In ruins since 1586 when the Priest bridge had also been destroyed) removed and rebuilt in the town. He increased the defenses of the Inner Courtyard with a new artillery tower: Tour Béthune, to the southwest, using the ruins of an existing tower from 1363. Three new stone galleries were built, to replace the wooden palisades that connected the three buildings: the Keep the Tour de Bethune and the Petit Chateau on two floors. He also relayed out the Petit Chateau, enlarged the park and strengthened the embankments of the Loire especially after a particularly strong flood in 1608 when he had to be rescued whilst in his study in the keep. Despite major reworking of the flood defences a few years earlier that saw the establishment of a new access road running along the Loire embankment and over the moat into the Outer Courtyard from the North. The bridge over the moat still stands. The outflow of both the Sange and the Oison was blocked at the Loire bridge and the mill was destroyed. The outflow was then transferred upstream of the newly laid out gardens.

Henry IV never visited the château, but Mazarin and Anne of Austria took refuge there in March 1652 during the Fronde, France's Religious war. Turenne stayed here the same year, before his defeat of the Grand Condé at the battle of Bléneau. The Chateau was under siege in July 1621 and Max I only periodically lived at Sully and there were only two further periods of development: 1622-3 & 1638–9. In 1638, Max I settled permanently in the castle, to direct the printing of his memoirs, the famous "Ecumenical Royal". The castle passed down to Max I's descendants through the 17th C. before passing across to a cousin in 1729 when the then Duke Max VI (Henri) died without heir.

Later, in 1716 and again in 1719 the château sheltered Voltaire, when he had been exiled from Paris for affronting the Régent, Philippe, duc d'Orléans. Under Duke Armand a large wing connecting the keep to the Gate Tower was built in 1715 Later work of the 18th C. included the building of another building in 1715, probably the Louis XV wing that replaced the eastern gallery between the Keep and the Petit Chateau. The moat between the Keep and the Inner Courtyard were also filled in In 1717 the Tower Keep of King Phillip was destroyed as was the stables in 1767 thus clearing the Outer Courtyard, under Duke Max Alexis. The Drawbridge from the Inner to the Outer Courtyards was replaced by a stone bridge in 1779.

=== Destruction of the Revolution ===
Duke Max VIII (1784-1807) is listed as the lord during the revolution in France. He was obliged to destroy the defences of the chateau by communal decree. This consisted of destroying the two eastern facing towers (Tour de Loire and Terrine) of the main keep. The others towers were opened up below the machicolations and they were all stripped internally completely, including floors. The western gallery wall was also destroyed, thus exposing the Inner Courtyard. As was common at the time the tombs of the Lords were opened and re interred in anonymous graves, Max I and his wife's bodies were moved in 1793.

=== Restoration ===
1808 brought a new branch of the de Bethune family to Sully with Max VIIIs mother Alexandrine controlling the estate 1807-8 before a cousin: Eugene, Comte de Bethune Sully gained the estate. The Title continued to cross lines as there was no direct lines and in 1868 Eugene II gained the estate. From 1869 to his death in 1908 Eugene II carried out repairs and upgrades to the buildings. There is reference to the interiors being modernise in their layout and decoration, although it is unclear if the newly laid out windows and doors were done at this point or if they had been done when the Louis XV wing was built 100 years earlier. Certainly the damage to the Keep due to the revolution was repaired and the towers rebuilt: with matching windows.

=== Disasters and War ===
In 1908 Eugene's son Max died and he lost interest in the château. In 1918 an accidental fire destroyed the Louis XV wing, leaving a shell. Although made watertight with new roof and windows in 1923 the interior was never restored. In 1928 the Building was listed as a historical monument. The chateau was damaged by bombing in 1940 and 1944, although during the war it was used as the German General Staff Headquarters, when much of the furniture was removed. In 1962 the chateau was sold on the death of Eugene IIs granddaughter: Mahaut Marie to the Loiret Local Council who have restored much of it and opened it to the public.

== The castle today ==
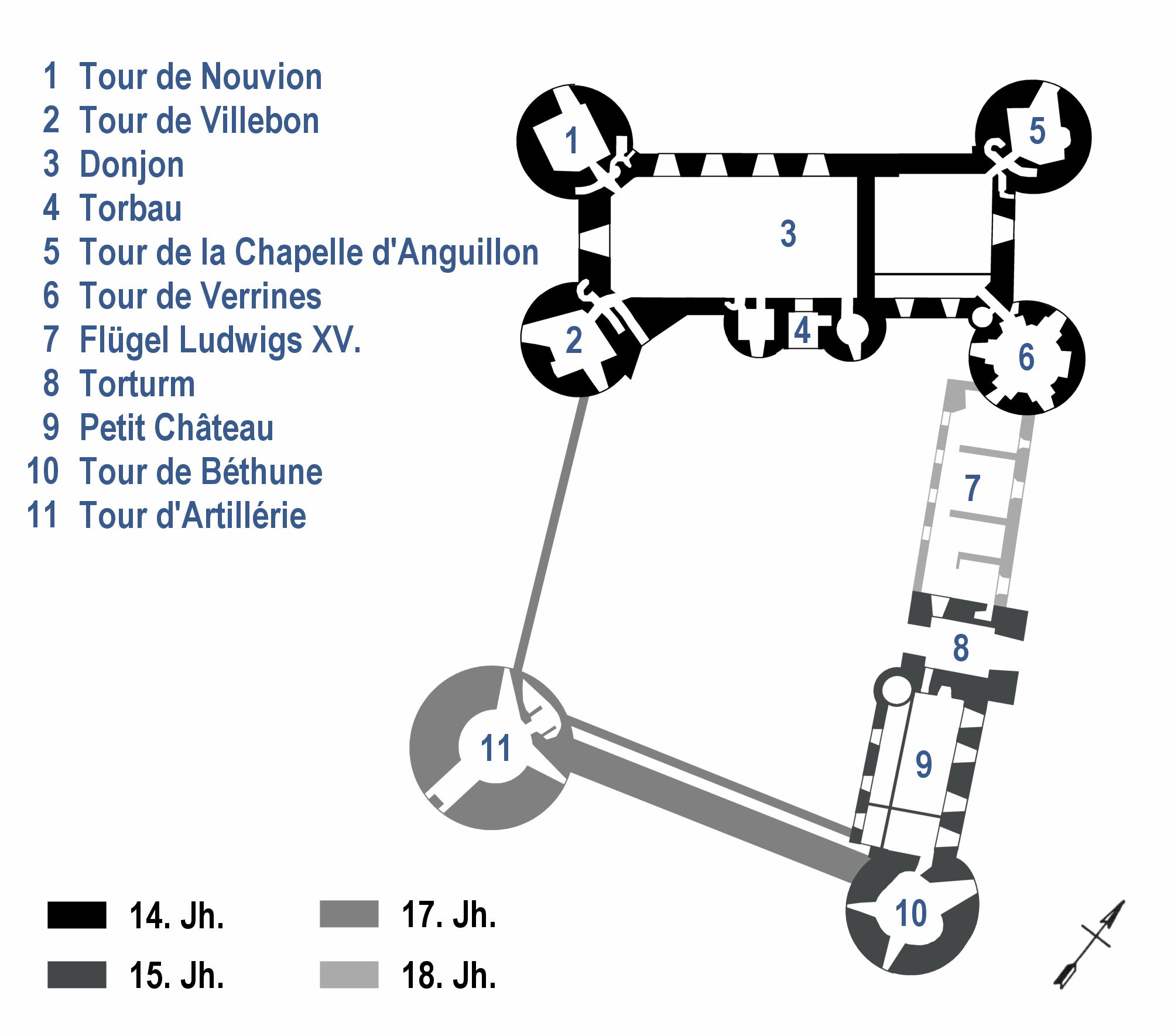
Floor plan of the castle

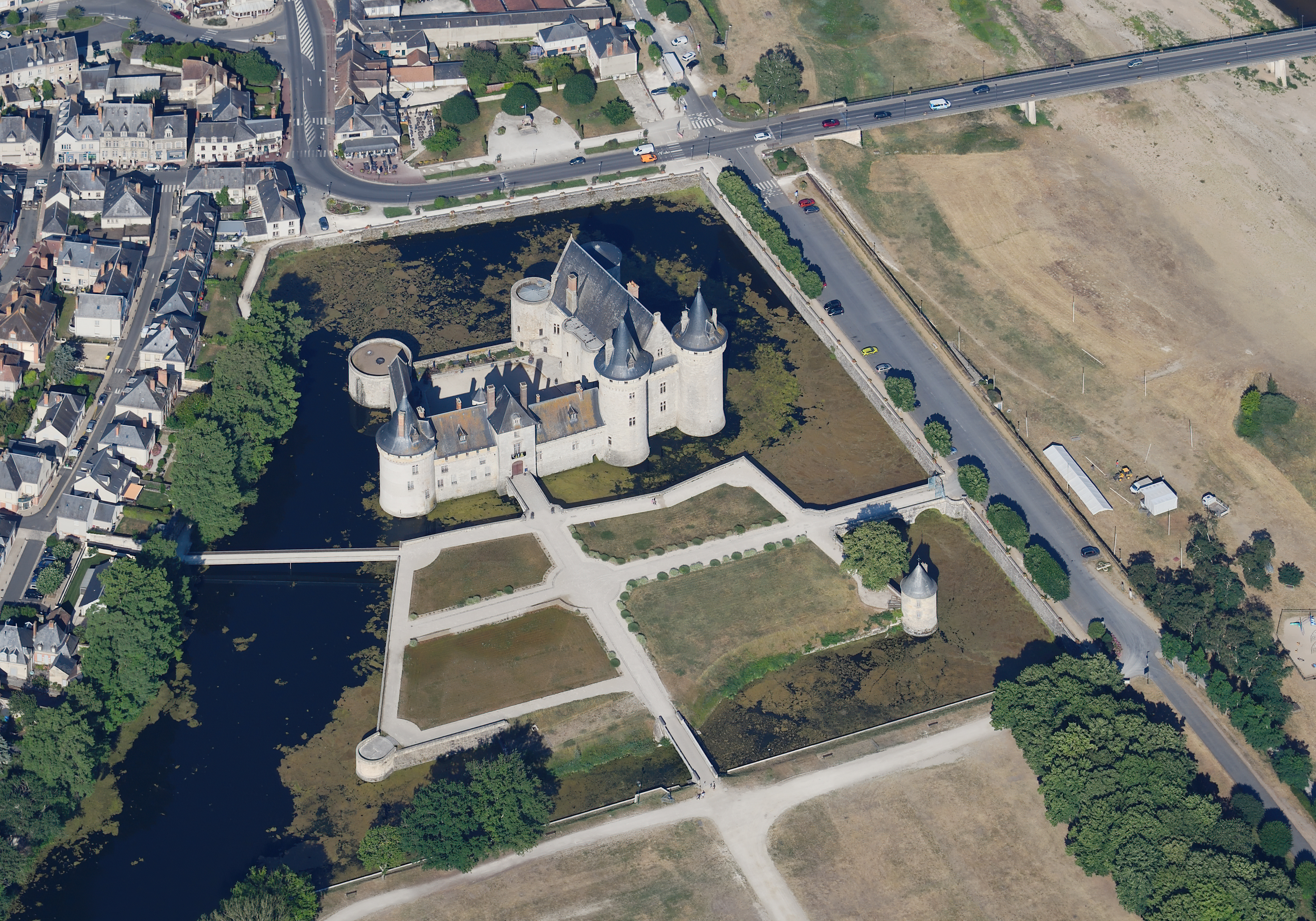
Aerial view of the castle

=== Outer Courtyard ===
Today there is a two-meter-high statue of white Carrara marble representing the first Duke of Sully, Maximilien de Béthune. The figure was originally made for Villebon Castle in 1642 by Pierre II. Biard on behalf of Rachel de Conchefilet. It shows the Minister of Henry IV wearing a laurel wreath and holding a marshal's staff.

=== Castle buildings ===
The buildings are grouped around the Inner Courtyard with a narrow gallery to the South—the so-called Galérie d'Agréement—of two storeys and a steep roof from the 17th century and a curtain wall to the west from the 19th century. All built in Sandstone, the roofs are covered with slate.

=== Gate Tower ===
A stone arched bridge on the west side of the Outer Courtyard leads to the square Gate Tower from the 15th century Its three storeys rise on a square plan and are completed by a bent hipped roof. To the courtyard side, the building has a narrow, pentagonal stair tower with five floors. The coat of arms of the de Béthune family can be seen above the arched entrance.

=== The Petit Chateau ===
South of the portal tower is the Petit Château, a three-storey steep-roofed building. Its top floor has a battlement on a cantilever stone console on the northeast façade. On the ground floor of the building is the former study of Maximilien de Béthunes, while on the first floor his bedroom can be visited. Both rooms were restored in the second half of the 20th century and show the building stock of the 18th century. However, their painted beamed ceilings date back to the 16th century.

=== The Louis XV Wing ===
North of the portal tower is an unfurnished two-storey steep-roofed building, called the wing of Louis XV. and borders at its northern end to the Keep. The Wing accidentally burnt down in 1918 and rebuilt in 1923, as a basic shell of only two floors (it was four).

=== Tour d'Artillery and Tour de Béthune ===
At the southern corner of the courtyard stands as a link between the western curtain wall and southern gallery of the Tour d'Artillerie (Artillery Tower), which owes its name to its use as a platform for cannon. The round tower has five-meter-thick walls and an outer diameter of 15 meters. Built in 1606 on the site of a previous tower from 1363, it has always had only one above-ground floor with a flat roof used originally to house cannon.

The southern end of the Petit Château joins a high round tower with four floors and a conical hipped roof. Its present name, Tour de Béthune, commemorates Maximilien de Béthune, originally it was called Tour de la Sange. With a diameter of twelve meters, it has in the attic a cantilevered, all-round battlement on stone consoles and machicolation rows and dates from 1440.

=== The Keep ===
The Keep from the end of the 14th century is the oldest preserved part of the castle complex. It has three above-ground levels, which are completed by a pitched roof. At each of the four corners of the 39 x 16-meter building, there is a projecting four-story round tower with a diameter of 11.50 meters. Only the two eastern corner towers still show their original shape. Crowned by a bent cone helmet, its fourth story features a projecting battlement with small windows, machicolations and loopholes. The two western corner towers, however, lack the fourth floor; while the northwestern tower has a flat cone helmet, the southwestern is completely roofless. All have in common, however, that they have in the Keep facing wall section a narrow spiral staircase and their floors have no vaulted ceilings, but flat wooden ceilings. The Keep, also called Grand Château, is accessed via a ground-level entrance on its south side. In earlier times, the entrance was only accessible via a drawbridge, as the keep was additionally protected from the courtyard by a moat filled today. The gatehouse is flanked on its west and east sides by two narrow round towers, the eastern contains the staircase to the keeps three floors, while on the ground floor of the western tower contains the chapel. The top floor of the keep has a cantilevered battlement with loopholes on all sides, although that to the west is rudimentary. The interior of the keep and its towers have been heavily modified throughout its life. Inside, all three floors are divided by a partition to the west a 300 m2 hall and a slightly smaller salon to the east. On the ground floor there is the Watch room, which has a coffered wooden ceiling painted partly with ducat gold and to the east a museum space and shop.

The second floor has the Grand Hall, which has served several times as a theatre. Its chimney on the south-east wall dates from the 15th century and has a wall painting in its upper mantelpiece, showing the Rosny Castle. East of the Great Hall is the so-called ceremonial room, the bedroom of the Dukes of Sully with Flemish tapestry and wooden beamed ceiling in the Italian style and wallpaper in blue Damask.

In the southern wall, behind a wood panelling is a hidden heavy iron door from the 16th Century, which leads to a small study in the first floor of the western tower in the entrance building. Originally the drawbridge was operated from there, the room later served as a study and then as a treasury of the lords of the castle. Today there is an oratory with a copy of the tomb of Maximilien de Béthune and his second wife Rachel de Conchefilet, which houses the mortal remains of the couple. The third, 16m high floor of the Keep is primarily known for its extraordinary roof truss, called the Grand Galetas. [5] The tall chestnut woodwork has the shape of a ship's keel turned upside down and today remains free from woodworm or other termites without the use of chemical means. It is considered a great masterpiece of medieval carpentry and is one of the few examples that are completely preserved from that time. The good condition of the roof truss results partly from a special processing method of the wood used, which came from the shipbuilding. After being placed in salt water, the wood was dried for years and treated with alum. In addition, the unusual construction of the roof truss ensured lasting and good ventilation of the beams, so that they still require no modern intervention for their preservation. From an art-historical point of view, a tapestry series of the 17th century is worth mentioning in addition to the beams. The six wall hangings from a Parisian workshop called Tenture de Psyché depict the myth of Psyche and were kept in Rosny-sur-Seine until March 1994.

=== Garden and Parkland ===
The 25-hectare garden lies to the east of the Outer Courtyard reached via a stone bridge. However, the symmetrical beds of the former Baroque garden are no longer preserved. Instead, the area is now almost completely occupied by trees with only the paths ways indicating the original layout.

Château de Sully-sur-Loire is listed as a monument historique by the French Ministry of Culture. Now a property of the Département du Loiret it has since benefited from numerous restorations. It hosts a classical music festival each June. The château contains numerous tapestries (including a set of six seventeenth-century hangings, the Tenture de Psyché), paintings of Sully's ancestors and heirs, and seventeenth-century furnishings. Here is also the tomb of Sully and that of his second wife.

== Notes ==
There are very limited references available here: The Loire Archives were destroyed by fire after WWII, which may be the reason. Few of the information sources available on the internet have provided any sources: primary or secondary and so the information is open to error. Any primary source refs that someone knows. please list!

== Sources ==
- Mesqui, Jean (1997). Chateaux-forts et fortifications en France. Paris: Flammarion. p. 493 pp. ISBN 2-08-012271-1.
- Château de Sully-sur-Loire
- "Sully - History of the City" at https://web.archive.org/web/20150211154354/http://www.sully-sur-loire.fr/decouvrir/historique-de-la-ville accessed 2-11-15
