= House of Albret =

Navarrese royal dynasty of French origin

Original coat of arms of the lords and dukes of Albret.

Coat of arms of the lords and dukes of Albret since the 15th century.

The House of Albret, which derives its name from the lordship (seigneurie) of Albret (Labrit), situated in the Landes, was one of the most powerful feudal families of France and Navarre during the Middle Ages. Establishing in 800s AD they distinguished themselves in the major local wars of the era, eventually transferring support from English to France. Becoming in great positions of power, and importance they were lords and dukes after helping in the wars. They had counties, and through marriage and connections they had many possessions, and power.

== History ==
The work of Anthony M. H. J. Stokvis establishes the genealogy of the Albrets to start with the 800s AD Basque nobleman Jimeno of Pamplona, patriarch of the Spanish Jiménez dynasty. Members of the House of Albret distinguished themselves during the major local wars of that era. During the 14th century they espoused the English cause for some time, afterwards transferring their support to the side of France.

Arnaud Amanieu I, Lord of Albret, helped to take Guienne from the English. His son Charles became constable of France, and was killed at the Battle of Agincourt in 1415. At that time the House of Albret had attained considerable territorial importance, due in great part to the liberal grants which it had obtained from successive kings of France.

The House of Albret then continued its ascension, favored by both Charles VI and Charles VII. It reached its apogee in the fifteenth and sixteenth centuries. They familiarized themselves with the court of France through their alliances. In 1470, they inherited the County of Périgord and the Viscounty of Limoges. Their new strength then allowed them to claim the inheritance of the Duchy of Brittany.

Alain the Great, Lord of Albret (died 1522), wished to marry Anne of Brittany, and to that end fought against Charles VIII; but his hopes being ended by the betrothal of Anne to Maximilian of Austria, he surrendered Nantes to the French in 1486.

They took possession of the county of Foix, when Jean I of Albret, son of Alain, became King of Navarre by his marriage with Catherine of Foix, Queen of Navarre in 1484. Their son Henry II, King of Navarre, was created Duke of Albret and a peer of France in 1550. By his wife Marguerite d'Angoulême, sister of Francis I, Henry II had a daughter, Jeanne d'Albret, Queen of Navarre, who married Anthony de Bourbon, Duke of Vendôme, and became the mother of Henry IV, King of France.

These new possessions (Béarn, Foix, Bigorre, Tartas, Castres, Dreux, etc.) gave them a real political role in the Renaissance century. However, the Albrets did not stay long at the top of the society of orders. Navarre was invaded by Spain in 1512, and the house of Albret kept only the small part on the French side of the Pyrenees (Lower-Navarre), and Joan of Albret is the last of her name to sit on the throne, because the Dukedom of Albret, was united to the crown of France by the accession of the crown prince.

The title of Duke of Albret was later granted to the family of La Tour d'Auvergne (see duc de Bouillon) in 1651, in exchange for Sedan and Raucourt.

A cadet of this house was Jean d'Albret-Orval, seigneur of Orval, count of Dreux and of Rethel, governor of Champagne (died 1524), who was employed by Francis I in many diplomatic negotiations, more particularly in his intrigues to get himself elected emperor in 1519.

List of the Historical Bible (c. 1355) with d'Albret coat of arms in the corners and a signature of Jeanne d'Albret.

== Lords of Albret ==
- Amanieu I (fl. 1050)
- Amanieu II (fl. 1096)
- Amanieu III (fl. 1130)
- Bernard I (fl. 1140)
- Amanieu IV (fl. 1174, died c. 1209)
- Amanieu V (died 1255)
- Amanieu VI (died c. 1270)
- Bernard Ezi I, 1270–1281
- Mathe d'Albret, 1281–1295
- Isabelle d'Albret, 1295–1298
- Amanieu VII, 1298–1324
- Bernard Ezi II, 1324–1358
- Arnaud Amanieu, 1358–1401
- Charles I d'Albret, 1401–1415
- Charles II d'Albret, 1415–1471
- Jean I of Albret (associated, died before 1471) also known as Jean I, viscount of Tartas
- Alain I of Albret le Grand, 1471–1522
- Jean II of Albret (associated, died 1516)
- Henry I of Albret 1522–1555 King of Navarre as Henry II
- Jeanne d'Albret 1555–1572 Queen of Navarre as Jeanne III of Navarre.
- Henry IV of France 1572–1610 (son of Jeanne III)

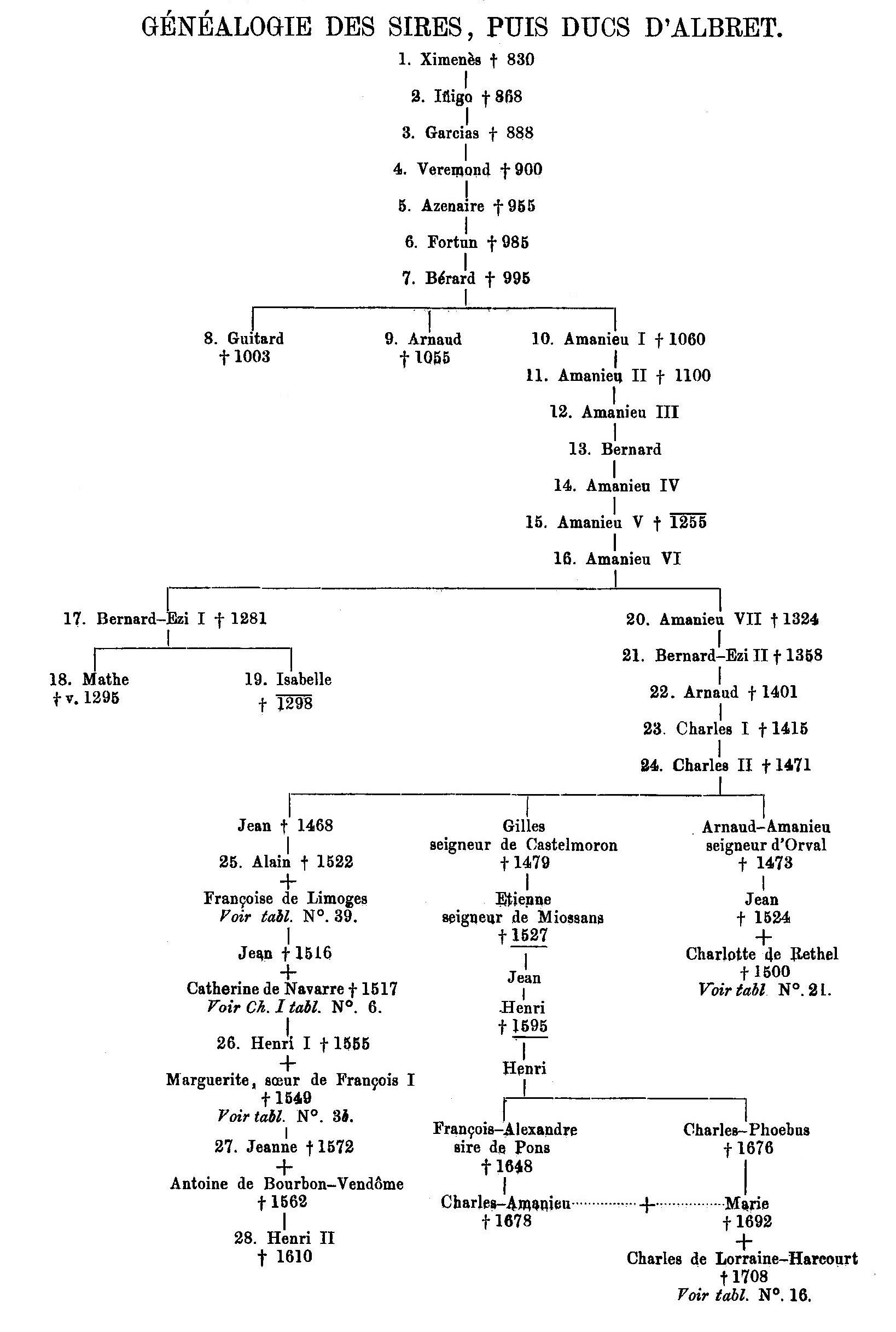
Genealogy of the Lords and Dukes of Albret.jpg

== Armorial ==
Figure	blasonnement
	lords d'Albret De gueules plain.
	counts d'Albret, 14th century écartelé en 1 et 4 d'azur aux trois fleurs de lys d'or et en 2 et 3 de gueules.
	Kings of Navarre parti de deux et coupé d'un : 1, de gueules aux chaînes d'or posées en orle, en croix et en sautoir, chargées en cœur d'une émeraude au naturel; en 2, contre-écartelé en 1 et 4 d'azur aux trois fleurs de lys d'or et en 2 et 3 de gueules; en 3, d'or aux quatre pals de gueules; en 4, contre-écartelé en 1 et 4 d'or aux trois pals de gueules, en 2 et 3 d'or aux deux vaches de gueules, accornées, colletées et clarinées d'azur, passant l'une sur l'autre; en 5, d'azur semé de fleurs de lys d'or à la bande componée d'argent et de gueules; et en 6, contre-écartelé en sautoir d'or aux quatre pals de gueules et de gueules au château d'or ouvert et ajouré d'azur et d'argent au lion de gueules armé, lampassé et couronné d'or; sur-le-tout d'or aux deux lions léopardés de gueules, armés et lampassés d'azur, passant l'un sur l'autre.
	lords of Orval de gueules à la bordure engrélée d'argent et au bâton de sable péri en barre. écartelé, au premier et au quatrième d'azur à trois fleurs de lys d'or, au deuxième et au troisième de gueules à la bordure engrêlée d'argent.
	counts of Rethel coupé en 1 écartelé en 1 et 4 d'azur aux trois fleurs de lys d'or et en 2 et 3 de gueules et en 2 d'azur semé de fleurs de lys d'or à la bordure componée d'argent et de gueules.

== See also ==
- Navarre monarchs family tree
- Guiraude de Dax
