= Amanieu VII d'Albret =

Lord of Albret, France (died 1326)

Coat of arms of the lords of Albret.

Amanieu VII (died 1326) was the Lord of Albret from 1298 until his death; the son of Amanieu VI.

He was an ally of the English and sat on the King's Council during the reigns of Edward I and Edward II of England. As a relative of the Plantagenets and of the sitting pope (Martin IV) and one of the most powerful lords in Gascony, he was the recipient of conspicuous royal largesse.

In 1286 Amanieu ended a long private war with Jean Ferrars, the English seneschal of Gascony, in return for 20,000 livres tournois from Edward I.

His son Bernard Ezi II succeeded him in Albret and on the council.

Amanieu used the French occupation of Aquitaine during the war between Edward I and Philip IV of France from 1294 to 1303 to expand his own authority at the expense of the ducal administration. In 1302 he was amongst the team of plenipotentiaries appointed by Edward I of England to negotiate the Treaty of Paris (1303) that returned Gascony to Edward.

Between 1310 and 1324 he continued to increase his independence from the English government in Bordeaux by appealing a successive number of sometimes trivial quarrels before the Parlement of Paris.

In 1324 he completed his defection from the English cause by joining the French during the short War of Saint-Sardos
