= Amanieu V d'Albret =

Original coat of arms of the lords and dukes of Albret.

Amanieu V was the Lord of Albret from 1209 to 1255. He was the son of Amanieu IV, lord of Albret, and participated in the Albigensian Crusade, being at the siege of Termes in 1210.

List of the Historical Bible (c. 1355) with d'Albret coat of arms in the corners and a signature of Jeanne d'Albret.

Amanieu was originally an ally of the English against the French in the Anglo-French War (1213–1214), but in December 1253 he made peace with Louis IX of France. He received a royal pardon. Then, in August 1254, Henry III of England declared peace between him and all his Gascon vassals, Amanieu included.

He had issue:

- Amanieu VI lord of Albret.

== Sources ==
- Lodge, Eleanor C. (1926). Gascony under English Rule. Kennikat Press.
- Taylor, Claire (2005). Heresy in Medieval France: Dualism in Aquitaine and Agenais, 1000-1249. Royal Historical Society.188
