= Bernard VI of Armagnac =

Bernard VI, Count of Armagnac
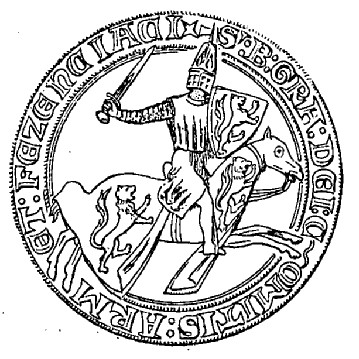
- Bernard VI
- Born: c. 1270
- Died: 1319
- Noble family: Armagnac
- Spouses: Isabella d'Albret; Cecilia Rodez
- Issue Detail: John I of Armagnac
- Father: Gerald VI of Armagnac
- Mother: Mathe de Béarn

Bernard VI, (c. 1270 – 1319), Count of Armagnac and Fezensac, was the son of Gerald VI, Count of Armagnac, and Mathe de Béarn.

== Service for King of France ==
In 1302, Bernard fought in Italy under the command of Charles of Valois. Subsequently, he participated in all the campaigns in Flanders directed by Philippe le Bel and his son Louis X (in 1303, 1304, 1313 and 1315). He then served as head of large detachments of the royal army. He contributed particularly to the victory of Mons-en-Alarcon on 18 August 1304, with four hundred armed men and a thousand policemen on foot. This military activity was very expensive and impoverished Bernard VI and he was obliged to borrow 2500 gold florins for the funeral of his wife.

== Conflict with House of Foix ==
After the death of Gaston VII, Viscount of Béarn, his grandfather, he maintained a long war against the Counts of Foix following the controversy over the will. The will favored the Count of Foix and Bernard refuted its legitimacy. The conflict escalated into an undeclared war between the houses of Foix and Armagnac, which took place during nearly all of the fourteenth century.

== Marriages and children ==
He first married Isabella d'Albret (c. 1275 † 1 December 1294), daughter of Bernard Ezy IV Sire of Albret and Jeanne de Lusignan. Through this marriage, Bernard VI carried the title of lord of Albret between the years 1280 and 1294.

In 1298, he married Cecilia de Rodez, heiress of Henri II Count of Rodez.
Children, all born of the second marriage were:

- John I (1305 † 1373), Count of Armagnac, of Fezensac and Rodez.
- Mathe († 1364), married in 1321 to Bernard Ezi IV, Sire d'Albret.
- Isabella, Lady of Beras.

Bernard had an illegitimate son;

- John, Bastard of Armagnac, called la Guerre (the War), participated in wars in Gascony. He was captured by the king's men, then released after promising to be faithful and loyal to the king. He left arms, embraced the ecclesiastical state, was Patriarch of Alexandria, then took the administration of the diocese of Rodez in 1376.

== Notes ==
Bernard VI of Armagnac House of Armagnac Born: c. 1270 Died: 1319
Preceded by Gerald VI	Count of Armagnac; 1285–1319	Succeeded by John I
