= Amadeus VII of Savoy =

Count of Savoy from 1383 to 1391

Amadeus VII

Count of Savoy
- Reign: 1383 – 1391
- Predecessor: Amadeus VI
- Successor: Amadeus VIII
- Born: 24 February 1360; Chambéry
- Died: 1 November 1391 (aged 31); Thonon
- Burial: Hautecombe Abbey
- Spouse: Bonne of Berry
- Issue: Amadeus VIII; Bonne; Joan
- House: Savoy
- Father: Amadeus VI of Savoy
- Mother: Bonne of Bourbon

Amadeus VII (24 February 1360 – 1 November 1391), known as the Red Count, was Count of Savoy from 1383 to 1391.

== Biography ==
Amadeus was born in Chambéry on 24 February 1360, the son of Count Amadeus VI of Savoy and Bonne of Bourbon. In 1382, summoned by Charles VI of France, he led Savoyard troops to victory against Flemish rebels at the Battle of Roosebeke. After his father's death in 1383, his mother and grandmother fought over the regency. In 1384, in order to suppress a revolt against his relative Edward of Savoy, Bishop of Sion, Amadeus led an army that attacked and pillaged Sion. In 1388, he acquired territories in eastern Provence and the port city of Nice, thus giving the County of Savoy control of an important Alpine pass and access to the Mediterranean Sea. Nice became part of the domains of the House of Savoy on 28 September 1388, when Amadeus VII, taking advantage of the internal struggles in Provence, negotiated the transfer with Giovanni Grimaldi, baron of Boglio (governor of Nice and the Eastern Provence) of Nice and the Ubaye Valley to the Savoy domains, with the name of Terre Nuove di Provenza. Amadeus' father, Amadeus VI, the Green Count, was credited with purchasing the territory of the mountain pass, the Col de Largentièes, today Maddalena Pass on the border of France and Italy, for the sum of 60,000 ecus, but this took place in 1388 after his death. The Col de Largentière was of great strategic and commercial importance because it linked Lyon with Italy; it offered an easy route between Piedmont and the outlying valley of Barcelonnette, which came into Savoyard possession when Amadeus VII, or his father, transferred it from the County of Provence to the County of Nice.

On 1 November 1391, Amadeus died from tetanus, as a result of a hunting accident. Upon his death, controversy arose because of his will. Amadeus left the important role of guardian of his son and heir, Amadeus VIII, to his own mother, a sister of the powerful Duke de Bourbon, instead of following the tradition of appointing the child's mother, who was a daughter of the equally powerful Duke de Berry. Due to the dispute between his mother and his wife, rumours that Amadeus had been poisoned emerged soon after his death. It took three months of negotiations to restore peace in the family.

Amadeus was known for his hospitality, for he would entertain people of all stations and never turn a person from his table without a meal.

== Marriage and children ==
Amadeus married Bonne of Berry, daughter of John, Duke of Berry, who was the younger brother of King Charles V of France. They had:

- Amadeus VIII, later known as Antipope Felix V, married Mary of Burgundy (1386–1422), daughter of Philip the Bold.
- Bonne (d. 1432), married Louis of Piedmont, the final of the Savoy-Achaea Branch.
- Joan (d. 1460), married John Jacob, Marquis of Montferrat

== Sources ==
- Coolidge, W. A. B. (October 1915). "The Passages of the Alps in 1518". The English Historical Review. 30 (120): 681–691. JSTOR 551305.
- Cox, Eugene L. (1967). The Green Count of Savoy. Princeton, New Jersey: Princeton University Press. LCCN 67-11030.
- Pfeffer, Wendy, ed. (2022). Blandin de Cornoalha, A Comic Occitan Romance: A New critical Edition and Translation. Translated by Burrell, Margaret; Pfeffer, Wendy. Medieval Institute Publications.
- Tuchman, Barbara Wertheim (1978). A Distant Mirror: The Calamitous 14th Century. New York: Knopf.
- Vaughan, Richard (2002). Philip the Bold: The Formation of the Burgundian State. Boydell Press.

Amadeus VII of Savoy House of Savoy Born: 1360 Died: 1 November 1391
Regnal titles
Preceded by Amadeus VI	Count of Savoy; 1383–1391	Succeeded by Amadeus VIII
