= Amanieu VI d'Albret =

Coat of arms of the early lords of Albret.

Amanieu VI (? — after April 1272) was a French nobleman, the Lord of Albret (French: Seigneur d’Albret). The lordship (seigneurie) of Albret, in the Landes, gave its name to one of the most powerful feudal families of France in the Middle Ages. One of Amanieu’s descendants became king of Navarre; a later descendant was Henry IV, king of France.

Amanieu’s reign was dominated by conflict over the English kings’ control of Gascony. His father, also named Amanieu, was one of the leaders of the revolt against English rule. After his father's death in 1255, Amanieu surrendered Milhau and its surrounding region to Prince Edward, newly arrived to assert English control over the province. His son, Amanieu VII, became a staunch ally of the English and was a member of the Curia Regis during the reigns of both Edward I and Edward II of England.

== Family ==
Lord Amanieu VI was a son of Lord Amanieu V and his first wife, Lady Assalide of Tartas (daughter of the nobleman Arnaud Raymond of Tartas). The first spouse of Amanieu VI was Lady Viane of Gontaud, who later divorced him; however, according to an ecclesiastical judgment in 1272, Viane was later ordered to return to her husband Amanieu. Amanieu’s second spouse was Lady Mathe of Bordeaux. Amanieu VI and Viane had at least two children, whilst he and Mathe had more children:

- Lord Bernard Ezi I, father of the daughters: Mathe of Albret and Isabella of Albret
- Assalide
- Lord Amanieu VII
- Arnaud Amanieu
- Mathe
