= Guilhem d'Anduza =

Troubadour

Guilhem d'Anduza (Note: Alternative Occitan spelling: Guillem; French: Guillaume d'Anduze.) (fl. 1244–81) was a minor troubadour active in the middle of the thirteenth century. He belonged to the family of the lords of Anduze, who were patrons of several other troubadours.

He was the eldest son of Peire Bremon VII, the last lord of Anduze and Sauve, and Josserande de Poitiers. Most of his father's lands were confiscated for rebellion in 1244. Guilhem acquired the barony of Olargues through marriage and inherited Hierle on his father's death in 1254. His petition to recover Anduze and Sauve was dismissed in 1259.

In 1266, according to the rubric, the troubadour Guiraut Riquier dedicated his canso "Anc non aigui nul temps de far chanso" to Guillem. Guillem himself composed at least one canso, "Sens ditz que·m lais de chantar e d'amor", (Note: His Pillet–Carstens number is 203 and "Sens ditz" is 203.1; there is no other song assigned to Guillem by Pillet–Carstens.) and possibly a descort, "Per solatz e per deport", which is assigned to either Guiraut de Salignac or Guilhem de Salignac in certain manuscripts.
