= Alain of Albret =

French aristocrat

Alain
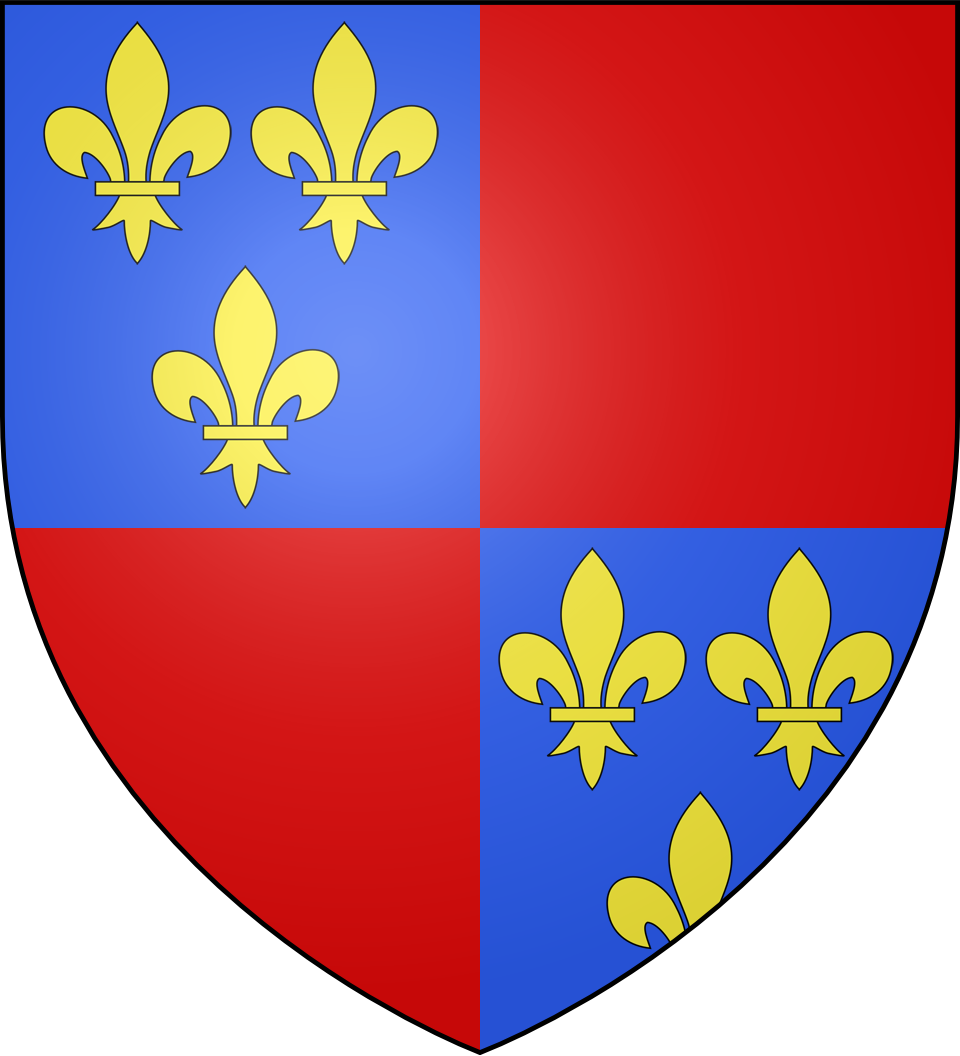
- Coat of arms of Albret
- Born: 1440
- Died: 1522 (aged 81–82)
- Noble family: Albret
- Spouse: Frances, Countess of Périgord
- Issue: Jean d'Albret; Gabriel; Charlotte of Albret; Amanieu d'Albret; Pierre; Louise; Isabelle
- Father: Jean I of Albret
- Mother: Catherine de Rohan

Alain of Albret (1440–1522), called "The Great", was a powerful French aristocrat. He was 16th Lord of Albret, Viscount of Tartas, the 2nd Count of Graves and the Count of Castres. He was the son of Catherine de Rohan and Jean I of Albret. He was the grandson and heir of Charles II of Albret and became head of the House of Albret in 1471.

During his half century of rule, he took a political course which was more agitated than effective, following his father's example, making him one of the most visible actors on the stage of Europe.

== Early career ==
Alain initially benefited from his fidelity to King Louis XI of France and, through this, enlarged his principality. He married Frances, Countess of Périgord, which brought him the county of County of Périgord, the viscounty of Limoges, and the Penthièvre claim to the Duchy of Brittany.

He later seized Armagnac and married his son, John, to Catherine, recently proclaimed queen regnant of the Kingdom of Navarre and heiress to Foix and Bigorre.

== The Mad War ==
The pattern of royal lands, independent duchies and lordly domains in 1477, shortly before the Guerre Folle

At this time, Alain hoped to consolidate his power by taking control of the Duchy of Brittany by marriage to Anne of Brittany, the daughter and heir of Duke Francis II. He entered into rebellion against the royal authority in support of the duchy, during the so-called Mad War. His intrigues were unsuccessful and he was defeated, having been unable to provide support to the duke in 1487. The following year, he brought reinforcements by sea, but was defeated by Louis II de la Trémoille at the Battle of Saint-Aubin-du-Cormier. He continued, however, to claim the legacy of Francis II, occupying Nantes with his Gascon troops. He still hoped to marry Anne and inherit the duchy but found it expedient to deliver Nantes to the royal army in exchange for an agreement that the French would support his claim to Anne's hand. Anne had no intention of marrying Alain. Instead, she married the French king, putting an end of Alain's dynastic ambition in Brittany.

== Family ==
Despite his failure in Brittany, Alain established other dynastic links through his daughter, Charlotte of Albret, who married Cesare Borgia in May 1499.

With Frances of Périgord, his children were:

- Jean d'Albret, who married in 1484 Catherine, Queen of Navarre. King iure uxoris of Navarre up to 1516.
- Gabriel, lord of Avesnes-sur-Helpe
- Charlotte of Albret, lady of Châlus, who married in 1500 Cesare Borgia
- Amanieu d'Albret († 1520), bishop of Pamiers, Comminges, and Lescar, and later a cardinal
- Pierre, count of Périgord
- Louise, viscountess of Limoges († 1531), who married in 1495 Charles I de Croÿ
- Isabelle, who married Gaston II, captal de Buch

Alain d'Albret died at Castel Jaloux in October 1522.

== Sources ==
- Duboscq, Guy (1938). "Amanieu, cardinal d'Albret et les évêchés du sud-ouest de la France d'après un compte du début du XVIe siècle". Annales du Midi (in French). 50–198: 200–207.
- Harris, Robin (1994). Valois Guyenne: A Study of Politics, Government, and Society in Late Medieval France. The Boydell Press.
- Luchaire, Achille (1974). Alain Le Grand Sire D'albret. Slatkine Reprints.
- Moreau, Gerard (1985). "Charles (I) de Croy". In Bietenholz, P.G.; Deutscher, Thomas B. (eds.). Contemporaries of Erasmus: A Biographical Register of the Renaissance and Reformation. Vol. 1:A-E. University of Toronto Press. pp. 363–364.
- Reulos, Michel; Bietenholz, Peter G. (1985). "John d'Albret". In Bietenholz, P.G.; Deutscher, Thomas B. (eds.). Contemporaries of Erasmus: A Biographical Register of the Renaissance and Reformation. Vol. 2:F-M. University of Toronto Press. p. 241.

French nobility
Preceded by Charles II	Seigneur d'Albret; 1471 – 1522	Succeeded by Henry I
