= Bernard Ezi II d'Albret =

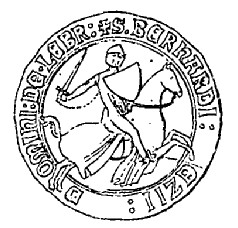
Seal of Bernard Ezi II

Bernard Ezi II (Ezi is also spelled Aiz) was the Lord of Albret from 1324 to 1358 and the son of Amanieu VII.

In 1330, Edward III of England sent men to Gascony to negotiate with the nobles. Bernard tried to negotiate a marriage between his eldest son and heir Arnaud Amanieu and a daughter of Edmund of Woodstock, 1st Earl of Kent, but the plans fell through. Bernard was nonetheless granted money and lands.

In 1337, Bernard and Oliver of Ingham were appointed lieutenants of the king of England in Gascony. This post was primarily military in nature. Subsequently, he proved to be one of the most loyal Gascon barons to the English cause. Philip VI of France found it impossible to win him over even with bribes.

In 1351, his second son Bernard was betrothed to Isabella, eldest daughter of Edward III. The marriage never took place, however, due to Isabella having changed her mind prior to her departure for Gascony.

He was married to Mathe, daughter of Bernard VI of Armagnac.
