= Charles II d'Albret =

French magnate, administrator and soldier

Coat of arms of Albret

Charles II d'Albret (1407–1471) was a French magnate, administrator, and soldier.

Charles was the son of Charles I of Albret and Marie de Sully. His father died in 1415 at the Battle of Agincourt, leaving the younger Charles as Lord of Albret and titular Count of Dreux, titular count since after Agincourt the lands of the County of Dreux were in English hands. Charles II d'Albret was a cousin and supporter of the Dauphin Charles, future King Charles VII of France, and Albret was the half-brother of Georges de La Trémoille, giving him strong ties within the king's court.

While serving on the royal council of Charles, Albret took part in the campaigns of Joan of Arc, and he participated in the coronation of Charles VII at Reims where Albret carried the sword of the king. Albret was later named lieutenant general of the province of Berry.

He was confirmed in possession of the County of Dreux in 1441 by King Charles VII.

During the reign of King Louis XI, Charles joined the rebellious nobles in the War of the Public Weal.

== Family ==
Charles married Anne of Armagnac. They had:

- Jean d'Albret (1420–1468), associated Lord of Albret, died before Charles II.
- Louis d'Albret, Cardinal and the Camerlengo of the Sacred College of Cardinals (1422–1465).
- Arnaud Amanieu d'Albret, d.1463, grandfather of Marie d'Albret, Countess of Rethel
- Charles d'Albret, d.1473
- Gilles d'Albret, d.1479
- Marie d'Albret, d.1486, married Charles I, Count of Nevers, on 11 June 1456, no issue
- Jeanne II d'Albret, d.1444, married Arthur III, Duke of Brittany, on 29 August 1442, no issue

== Death ==
On his death Albret passed to his grandson Alain (called Alain the Great), Jean's son, but he left the County of Dreux to his third son, Arnaud Amanieu. Alain, however, seized control of the county. His fourth son, Charles, was executed for treason in 1473.

== Sources ==
- de Carvalho, Helena Avelar (2021). An Astrologer at Work in Late Medieval France: The Notebooks of S. Belle. Brill.
- Bordonove, Georges, Charles VII le Victorieux. Paris: Pygmalion, 1985.
- Manning, Scott (2023). Joan of Arc: A Reference Guide to Her Life and Works. Rowman & Littlefield. ISBN 978-1538139165.
