= Anthony Marinus Hendrik Johan Stokvis =

Anthony Marinus Hendrik Johan Stokvis (23 September 1855, The Hague - 17 November 1924) is a figure in the fields of chronology and genealogy. His major work, Manuel d'Histoire, de Généalogie et de Chronologie de tous les États du Globe, depuis les temps les plus reculés jusqu'à nos jours, was published at Leiden, in three volumes, 1888-1893, and reprinted in 1966.
