= Constable of France =

First Officer of the Crown in the Kingdom of France

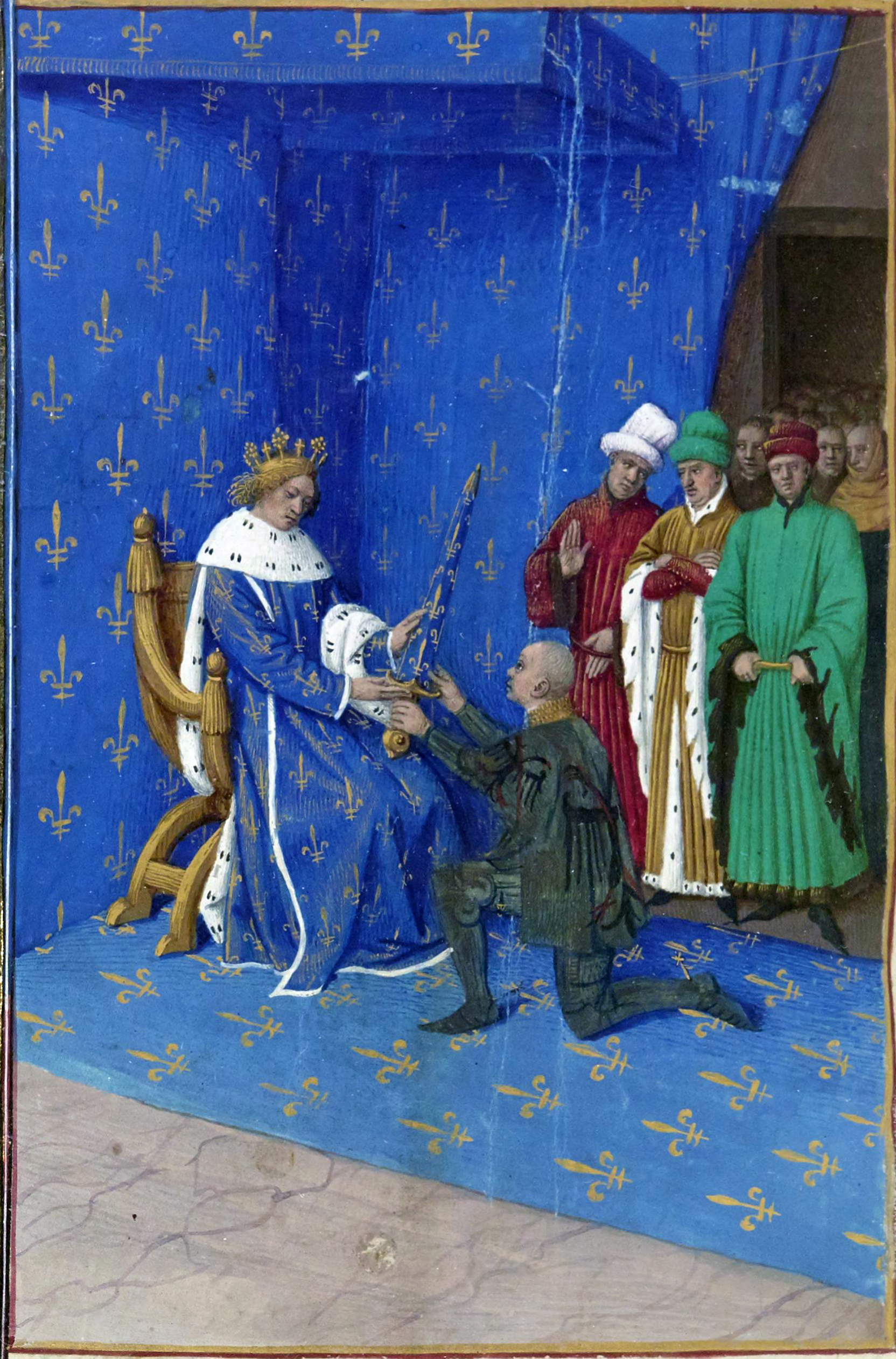
2 October 1370: Charles V of France presents the sword Joyeuse to the Constable Bertrand du Guesclin; miniature by Jean Fouquet.

The Constable of France (French: Connétable de France, from Latin comes stabuli for 'count of the stables') was lieutenant to the King of France, the first of the original five Great Officers of the Crown (along with seneschal, chamberlain, butler, and chancellor) and the commander-in-chief of the Royal Army. He was, at least on paper, the highest-ranking member of the French nobility.

The Connétable de France was also responsible for military justice and served to regulate the Chivalry. His jurisdiction was called the Constabulary (connestablie; or in modern French orthography which sticks closer to the correct pronunciation: connétablie).

The office was established by King Philip I in 1060 AD, with Alberic becoming the first Constable. The office was abolished in 1627, with an edict, by Cardinal Richelieu, upon the death of François de Bonne, duc de Lesdiguières, in order to strengthen the immediate authority of the King over his army.

The position was officially replaced by the purely ceremonial title "Dean of Marshals" (Doyen des maréchaux), who was in fact the most senior "Marshal of France" (Maréchal de France); as the word doyen is used in French mainly in the sense of "the eldest".

The later title Marshal General of France or more precisely "Marshal General of the King's camps and armies" (Maréchal général des camps et armées du Roi) was bestowed on the most outstanding military leaders. The recipient had command authority over all the French armies and garrisons who were engaged in war, and was senior to the Maréchaux de France, but had none of the extended political powers of the earlier "Constable of France".

== Badge of office ==
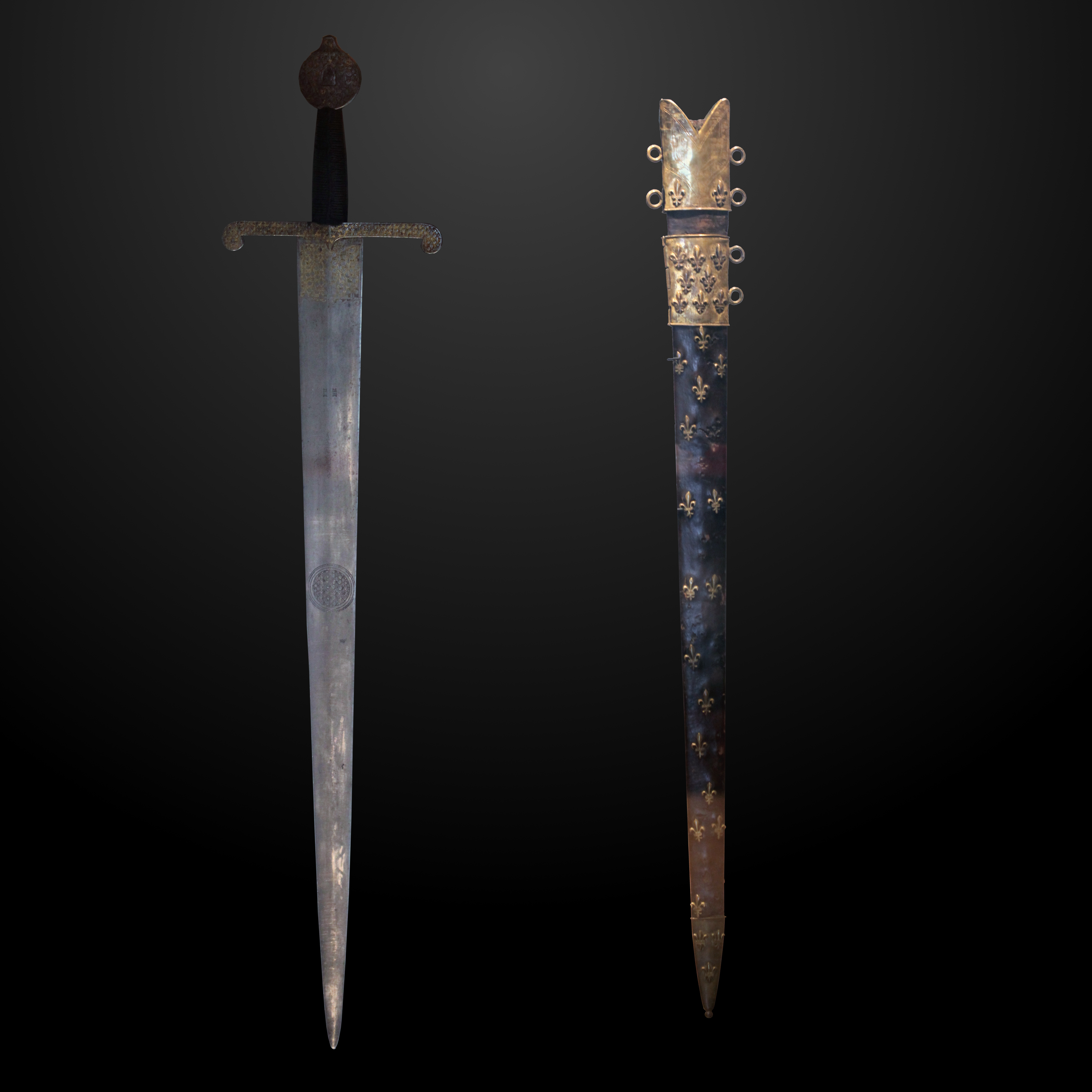
Constable of France sword, on display at the Musée de l'Armée at Les Invalides, Paris

The badge of office was a highly elaborate sword called Joyeuse, after the legendary sword of Charlemagne. Joyeuse was a sword made with fragments of different swords and used in the Sacre of the French Kings since at least 1271. It was contained in a blue scabbard embellished with royal symbol, the fleur-de-lis, in column order from hilt to point. Traditionally, the constable was presented with the sword on taking his office by the King himself.

== Authority ==
After the abolition of the office of Sénéchal in 1191, the Connétable became the most important officer in the army, and as First Officer of the Crown, he ranked in ceremonial precedence immediately after the peers. He had the position of Lieutenant-general of the King within the kingdom. The constable had under his command all military officers, including the powerful maréchaux; he was also responsible for the financing of the army, and administering military justice. The official name of the jurisdiction was la connétablie (the constabulary), which he exercised with the assistance of the Maréchaux de France (Marshals of France). This paralleled the Court of the Lord Constable, later called curia militaris of Court of Chivalry, which existed in England at that time.

== Persons subordinate to the Constable of France ==
- Marshal of France (Maréchal de France). However, during exceptional times the Marshal of France could be senior to the Constable, depending on the decisions of the King
- Colonel-general – a special category of general in the Royal French army, commanding all the regiments of the same branch of service (i.e. Cavalry, Dragoons, Infantry et al.)
- General
- Lieutenant-general – the highest regular general officer rank of the French army to which a career army officer could be promoted on the basis of seniority and merit, and not noble blood
- Maréchal de camp (literally (Military) Camp Marshal), not to be confused with Field Marshal) – the lowest general officer rank, in later times renamed Major-général and equivalent to the present-day général de brigade (brigadier-general)
- Porte-Oriflamme – a prestigious honorary position, not an army rank, which gave the right to carry the King's royal banner (called Oriflamme) into battle
- Grand Master of Crossbowmen (Grand-Maître des Arbalétriers du Roi) who was in charge of all archers in the army
- Grand Master of Artillery (Grand-Maître de l'Artillerie royale). From the beginning of the 17th century, the Grand Master of the Artillery became a Great Officer of the Crown an immediate subordinate of the King and was no longer under the command of the Constable.

NOT UNDER THE AUTHORITY OF THE CONSTABLE:

- The title "Lieutenant-general of the Realm" (Lieutenant général du royaume) was not a military rank, but a royal appointment. It was bestowed by the King of France during times of crisis (civil war, a severe illness of the King, war with other realms such as England etc.) on a royal prince of the blood of his choice; who thus became the Commanding general of the entire kingdom, in effect, with supreme command over the civil service, the army and even the Connétable de France, until the moment the King chose to take back the supreme authority in his own hands.

== Constables of France ==
Discontinuity in the dates for Constable tenure may be due to an incomplete record of governmental and episcopal acts or the temporary assumption of duties by other officials or unnamed deputies during transitional periods, but there is no evidence that the role of Grand Constable was ever fully vacated or unfilled. For example, Baldric de Dreux acquired a deadly infection, became a monk, and was miraculously healed, during which time either Baldric or the Seneschal appointed a deputy and Baldric resumed his lifelong service as Constable after recovering from his illness.

=== Constables of the Kings of France ===
==== During the Capétien dynasty ====
- Baldric de Dreux, 20 May 1043–1069
- Walter (Baldric's deputy), 1048
- Alberic (Baldric's deputy), 1060
- Gauthier, 1069–1071
- Adelelm (constable), 1071–1075
- Adam le Isle, 1075–1085
- Thibaut, Seigneur de Montmorency, 1085–1107
- Gaston de Chanmont, 1107–1108
- Hugues le Borgne de Chanmont, 1108–1135
- Mathieu de Montmorency (died 1160), 1138–?
- Simon de Neauphle-le-Chateau, 1165–?
- Raoul I de Clermont (died 1191), 1174–1191
- Dreux IV de Mello (1148–1218), 1194–1218
- Mathieu II le Grand, Baron de Montmorency (died 1231), 1218–1231
- Amaury de Montfort (died 1241), 1231–1240
- Humbert V de Beaujeu (died 1250), 1240–1250
- Gilles de Trasignies (died 1276), 1250–1276
- Humbert VI de Beaujeu (died 1285), 1277
- Raoul II de Clermont (died 1302), 1277–1302
- Gaucher V de Châtillon (1249–1329), 1307–1329

The Valois Dynasty

- Raoul I of Brienne, Count of Eu and Guînes (d. 1344), 1329–1344
- Raoul II of Brienne, Count of Eu and Guînes (died 1350), 1344–1350
- Charles de la Cerda (died 1354), 1350–1354
- Jacques de Bourbon, Count of La Marche, (1319–1362) 1354–1356
- Walter VI of Brienne (c. 1304–1356), 1356
- Robert Moreau de Fiennes (1308–1372), 1356–1370
- Bertrand du Guesclin (1320–1380), 1370–1380
- Olivier V de Clisson (1336–1407), 1380–1392
- Philip of Artois, Count of Eu (1358–1397), 1392–1397
- Louis de Sancerre (1341–1402), 1397–1402
- Charles d'Albret, Comte de Dreux (died 1415– Agincourt), 1402–1411
- Waleran, Count of Saint Pol (died 1415), 1411–1413
- Charles d'Albret, Comte de Dreux (died 1415– Agincourt), 1413–1415
- Bernard VII, Count of Armagnac (died 1418), 1415–1418
- Charles II, Duke of Lorraine (1365–1431), 1418–1424
- John Stewart, Earl of Buchan (c. 1381–1424), 1424
- Arthur III, Duke of Brittany (1393–1458), 1425–?
- Louis de Luxembourg, Count of Saint-Pol (1418–1475), 1465–?
- John II, Duke of Bourbon (1426–1488), 1483–1488

===== English-appointed Constables =====
- Humphrey Stafford, 1st Duke of Buckingham (1430)
- John Talbot, 1st Earl of Shrewsbury (1384/1390–1453), 1445–1453 (appointed by Henry VI of England in his position as king of France)

==== During the Valois-Angoulême dynasty ====
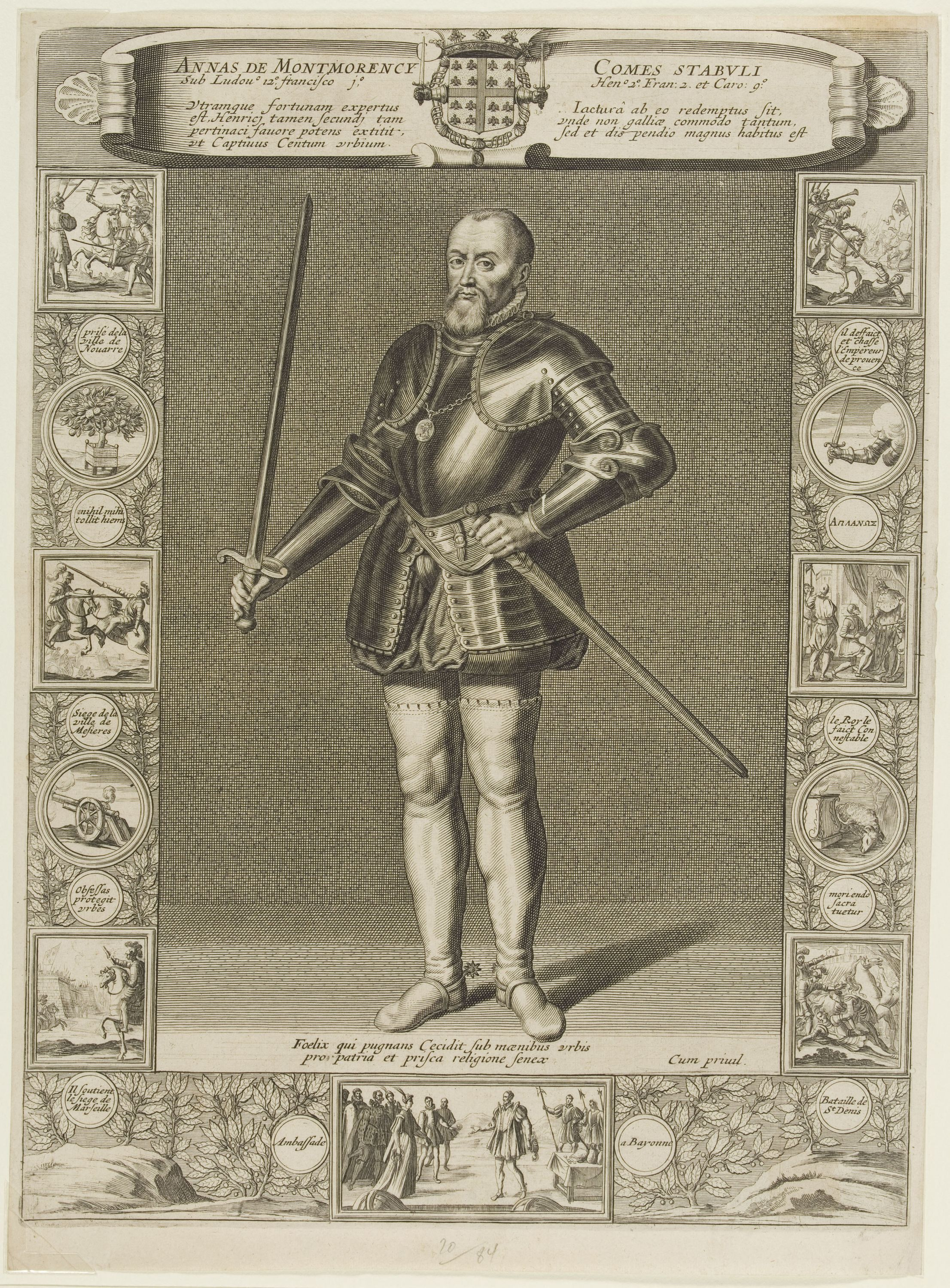
1560 engraving of Anne de Montmorency as Constable of France

- Charles III, Duke of Bourbon (1490–1527), 1518–1523
- Anne de Montmorency, Grand Maitre de France (1492–1567), 1538–1567

==== During the Bourbon dynasty ====
- Henri I de Montmorency (1534–1614), 1593–1614
- Charles d'Albert, 1st Duke of Luynes (1621), 1621
- François de Bonne, Duke of Lesdiguières (1543–1626), 1622–1626

=== First French Empire ===
During the Consulate regime (1799–1804), the deposed Bourbon dynasty, through the Comte d'Artois, allegedly offered Napoléon Bonaparte, at that time First Consul of the Republic, the title of "Constable of France" if he would restore the Bourbons as Kings of France. Bonaparte declined the offer.

However, in 1808, Emperor Napoléon I (since 1804) did himself appoint the Grand Dignitaries of the French Empire (Grands Dignitaires de l'Empire Français), among them his younger brother Louis Bonaparte, (in 1806 King of Holland by decision of his brother) as Constable, and Marshal of the Empire Louis Alexandre Berthier, the French Army Chief of Staff and Prince of Neuchâtel as Vice-Constable. Both titles were of a purely honorific nature, and disappeared with the Napoleonic regime's fall.

== Movies ==
If I Were King, 1938, with François Villon (played by Ronald Colman), who was appointed by Louis XI, King of France (played by Basil Rathbone) to be Constable of France for one week.

Various versions of Shakespeare's play Henry V depict Constable Charles d'Albret, Comte de Dreux, who was appointed by Charles VI of France and was killed in the Battle of Agincourt (1415). He is played by Leo Genn in the 1944 film, by Richard Easton in the 1989 film, and by Maxime Lefrancois in the 2012 film (part of The Hollow Crown). In the 1944 film he dies in personal combat with King Henry. In the 1989 film he is depicted as falling from his horse into the mud (historical tradition holds he was drowned in the mud due to the weight of his armour, disabled by having his horse fall on him). In the 2012 film he is shot by a longbowman after stabbing the Duke of York in the back in woodland away from the main battle.

== See also ==
- Constable
- Lord High Constable
- Joan of Arc – believed by some to have been appointed Constable of France by Charles VII
