= Béraud =

Béraud is a French surname with Germanic origins, combining bern (bear) and wald (rule). It may refer to:

- Henri Béraud (1885–1958), French writer
- Jean Béraud (1849–1935), French artist
- Luc Béraud (born 1945), French filmmaker

== See also ==
- Beraud, Torbeck, Haiti
- Béraut
- Bérot
- Berard
- Breaux
