= Berard =

Berard (or Bérard) is both a surname and a given name. Notable people with the name include:

== People with the given name ==
- Berard of Carbio (died 1220), Italian Franciscan friar
- Berard of Castagna (died 1252), Italian archbishop
- Bérard d'Albret, Lord of Vayres (died 1346), French nobleman
- Berard Haile (1874–1961), American Franciscan priest and anthropologist

== People with the surname ==
- Al Berard (born 1960), American Cajun musician and composer
- André Bérard (born 1940), Canadian businessman
- Auguste Bérard (1802–1846), French surgeon
- Bryan Berard (born 1977), American ice hockey player
- Christian Bérard (1902–1949), French artist, fashion illustrator and designer
- David Berard (born 1970), American ice hockey coach
- Guillaume Bérard (fl. 1574–1588), French diplomat and physician
- Joseph Frédéric Bérard (1789–1828), French physician and philosopher
- Julien Bérard (born 1987), French road bicycle racer
- Kally Berard (born 1999), American actress
- Leah Berard (born 1978), American rugby referee
- Léon Bérard (1876–1960), French politician and lawyer
- Marcel Bérard (1933–2021), Canadian politician
- Marie Bérard, French-Canadian violinist
- Patrick Berard (born 1959), French sprint canoeist
- Pierre Bérard (born 1991), French rugby player
- Roxane Berard (1933–2019), Belgian-American actress
- Thomas Bérard (died 1273), French Grand Master of the Knights Templar
- Victor Bérard (1864–1931), French diplomat and politician

== Places ==
- Le Ménil-Bérard, French commune
- Grand Bérard (Le), mountain top of Parpaillon massif (3048 m), see List of mountains of the Alps above 3000 m
- Berard Beach, Saskatchewan, Canadian hamlet
