= Breaux =

Breaux is a surname of French origin. It is a variation of the French last name Breaud, which in turn, derives from the Germanic name Beraud. Notable people with the surname include:

- Aminta H. Breaux (born 1959), American psychologist and academic administrator
- Brandon Breaux, visual artist from Chicago
- D-D Breaux (born 1953), coach of the Louisiana State University's women's gymnastics team
- Delvin Breaux (born 1989), American football player
- Don Breaux (born 1940), American football player and coach
- Jean Breaux (1958–2024), American politician serving in the Indiana state Senate
- John Breaux (born 1944), American politician, former U.S. Senator and U.S. Representative from Louisiana
- Marc Breaux (1924–2013), American choreographer
- Tim Breaux (born 1970), American basketball player
- Frank Ocean (born 1987), singer/songwriter, born Christopher Edwin Breaux

== See also ==
- Breaux Greer, American javelin thrower
- Breaux Bridge, Louisiana
