= Eunique Jones Gibson =

American content producer

- Born: Washington, D.C., U.S.
- Education: Bowie State University
- Occupations: CEO, Culture Brands
- Known for: Creator of the "Because of Them, We Can™" campaign
- Website: becauseofthemwecan.com

Eunique Jones Gibson is the founder and publisher of Because of Them We Can™, CEO of Culture Brands and a photographer, and an author and activist. She became known for creating the "Because of Them, We Can™" campaign.

== Early life and education ==
Eunique Jones Gibson was born in Washington, DC and grew up in Maryland. She majored in communications at the Bowie State University. After graduating, Gibson accepted a position in online advertising with Microsoft in New York City.

== Career ==
In September 2014, Eunique introduced a new project "Por Ellos, Sí Podemos" with the start of National Hispanic Heritage Month.

In 2013, Gibson created and launched the Because of Them, We Can™ campaign during Black History Month. Inspired by her own sons, the photo campaign included photos of children dressed as historical Black icons. Because the campaign went viral, Eunique left her job to focus on the campaign and grow the movement. Due to her work, she received a post to the Arts Advisory Board under the White House Initiative on Educational Excellence for African Americans.

In February 2012, Gibson also created the photo awareness campaign "I AM Trayvon Martin" after the death of Trayvon Martin to highlight the need for racial justice.

== Awards and honors ==
- 2018: Webby Award honoree
- 2015: 40 Under 40 Award from the Prince George's County Social Innovation Fund
- 2014: White House Champion of Change for the Because of Them, We Can™ campaign
