= Prince George's Film Festival =

Annual film festival held in the United States

- Location: Largo, Maryland, U.S.
- Founded: January 2022; 4 years ago
- Founded by: Rhonda Dallas
- Language: English
- Website: www.pgfilmfestival.com

The Prince George's Film Festival, sometimes styled as the Prince George's County Film Festival, is an annual film festival in suburban Maryland near Washington, D.C. Although it was founded in 2022, there was a previous one by the same name that ran in the 1970s. Celebrating the historic status of Prince George's County as an African-American majority county, it diversifies film by showcasing a wider array of established and emerging independent filmmakers. The festival has competitive sections for feature films, student films, animation, documentaries, international films, short films, and narrative features. Sponsors include the Prince George's Arts and Humanities Council, the Prince George's Film Office, Bowie State University (an HBCU), Adobe, WPGC radio, the Prince George's Community College Center for the Performing Arts, TV One, the film office of the Maryland Department of Commerce, the Excellence in Education Foundation for PGCPS, WETAMetro, PBS, Washington Area Lawyers for the Arts, and Lake Arbor Jazz. Film venues included MGM National Harbor, Bowie State University,

Films awarded in 2024 include Spawns (best of festival), Officer Chauvinist (best animation), The Poppaw Queen (best documentary), Braised (Thit Kho) (best international), Veils-Requiem for Trayvon (best narrative feature), The Legacy of Lee's Flower Shop (best short film), Just in Time (best student).

Prince George's County estimated in 2023 that the festival attracted 2,340 attendees, a 400% increase from its first year, coming from 19 states, and generating $198,459 for local businesses.
