= Bérot =

Bérot (French: [beʁo]) is a French surname. Notable people with the surname include:

- Jean-Louis Bérot (1947–2025), French rugby union player
- Philippe Bérot (born 1965), French rugby union player and coach

== See also ==
- Béraud, people with this French surname
- Béraut, a commune in southwestern France
