= La Pâtisserie Gloppe =

1889 painting by Jean Béraud

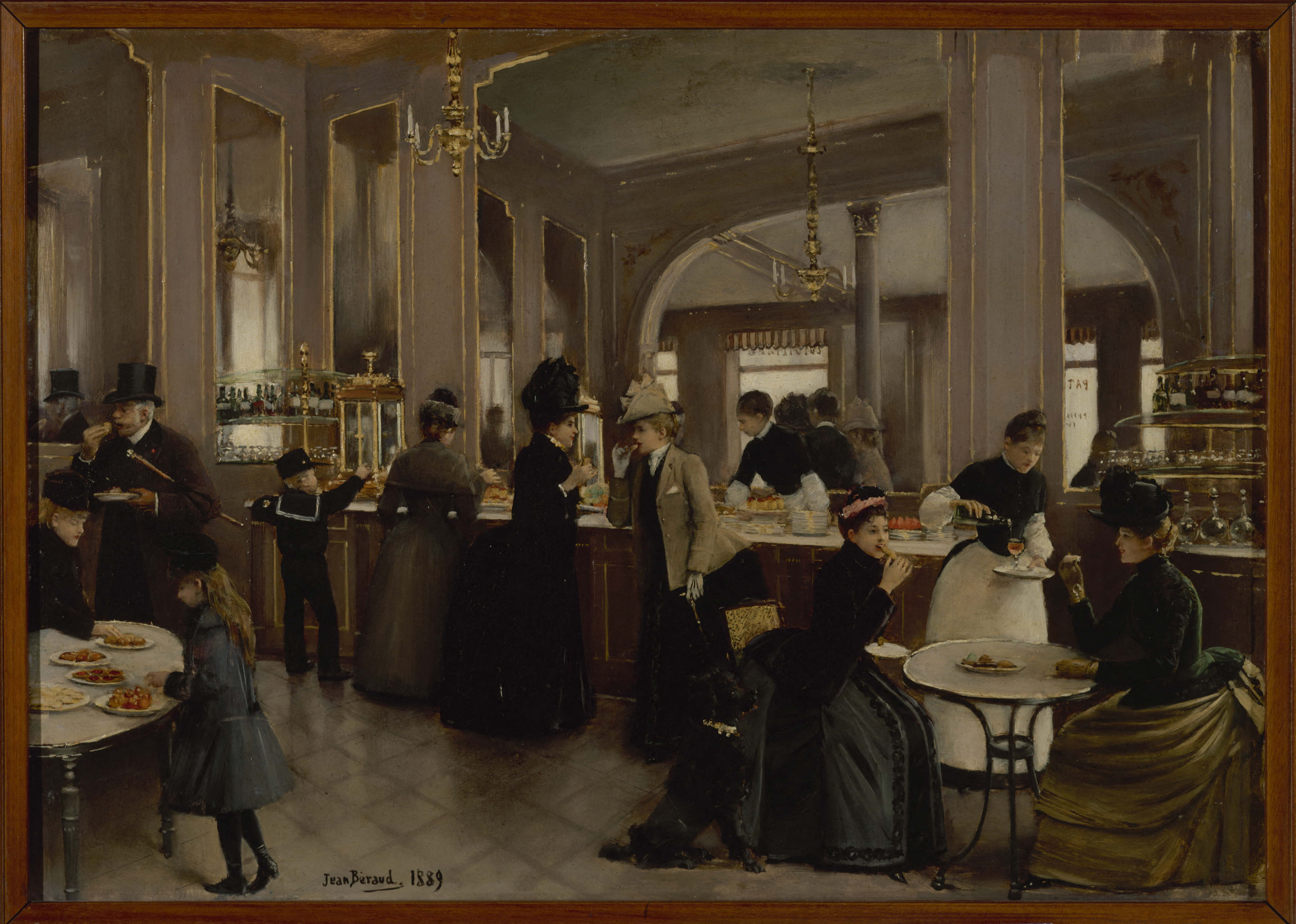
La Pâtisserie Gloppe (1889) by Jean Béraud

La Pâtisserie Gloppe (Note: Its full title is La Pâtisserie Gloppe (6, avenue des Champs-Elysées, 8e arrondissement, Paris) is an 1889 oil on canvas painting by Jean Béraud, now in the Musée Carnavalet in Paris.

The Gloppe business originated in Roanne, opening its first Parisian premises before 1851 at the Rue Royale-Saint-Martin, then a second around 1873 at 9 boulevard des Italiens, and finally a third at Rond-point des Champs-Élysées (now 2 Avenue Franklin-D.-Roosevelt). It ceased trading after 1915.
