= Bowie State University =

Historically black university in Bowie, Maryland, US

Coordinates: 39.02158°N 76.75684°W

- Former name: List: Baltimore Normal School for Colored Teachers (1867–1883); Baltimore Normal School (1883–1908); Maryland Normal and Industrial School at Bowie (1908–1935); Maryland Teachers College at Bowie (1935–1963); Bowie State College (1963–1988)
- Type: Public HBCU
- Established: January 9, 1865
- Parent institution: University System of Maryland
- President: Aminta H. Breaux
- Provost: Guy-Alain Amoussou
- Students: 5,970 (fall 2025)
- Undergraduates: 4,810 (fall 2025)
- Postgraduates: 1,160 (fall 2025)
- Location: Bowie, Maryland, United States
- Campus: Suburban, 338½ acres (1.4 km^{2})
- Colors: Black and gold
- Nickname: Bulldogs
- Sporting affiliations: NCAA Division II - CIAA
- Mascot: Butch the Bulldog
- Website: bowiestate.edu

Bowie State University (Bowie State or BSU) is a public historically black university in Prince George's County, Maryland, United States, north of Bowie. It is part of the University System of Maryland. Founded in 1865, Bowie State is Maryland's oldest historically black university and one of the ten oldest in the country. Bowie State is a member-school of the Thurgood Marshall College Fund.

== History ==
=== Teachers College ===
Bowie State University is the oldest historically black university in Maryland. It was founded in 1865 by the Baltimore Association for the Moral and Educational Improvement of the Colored People as a teaching school. The school first used space at the African Baptist Church at Calvert Street and Saratoga Street, in Baltimore, Maryland. In 1867, a dedicated facility was purchased nearby at Saratoga Street and Courtland Street, and the school was formally named the Baltimore Normal School for Colored Teachers. After being reorganized in 1883 as the Baltimore Normal School, it educated African Americans to be teachers for African American students until 1908. At that time, the school became a state institution of teaching under the Maryland State Department of Education and was redesignated as a Normal School No. 3.

Shortly thereafter, in 1910, the school moved to the Jericho Farm, a 187-acre campus in Prince George's County. About 60 students lived in the old farmhouse. The school was renamed in 1914 as the Maryland Normal and Industrial School at Bowie. A two-year professional degree was added in 1925, a three-year program in 1931, a four-year program for elementary school teachers in 1935, a four-year program for junior high school teachers in 1951, and a four-year program for secondary school teachers in 1961. In recognition of its principal role, the school was renamed in 1935 as Maryland Teachers College at Bowie.

=== Bowie State University ===
In 1963, Bowie State College was officially named a liberal arts school – with additional majors in English, history, and social science – although emphasis remained on teacher education. A Master's degree in education was added in 1969.

The school was renamed Bowie State University in 1988, as a member of the University System of Maryland. In the subsequent decades, Bowie continued to expand, especially in professional and Science, technology, engineering, and mathematics (STEM) fields. In 1992, it became the first HBCU to expand overseas, with graduate programs for military personnel stationed abroad. By 2017, the school offered 20+ undergraduate majors and 30+ advanced degrees or certificate programs.

Bowie State University was ranked #61 in the United States and was #1 in the State of Maryland for alumni earnings above expectation according to The Economist magazine's first-ever rating of colleges in America, which was released in October 2015. They used a statistical estimate for each college based exclusively on factors such as average SAT scores, sex ratio, race breakdown, college size, whether a university was public or private, and the mix of subjects students chose to study.

In 2020, MacKenzie Scott donated $25 million to Bowie State which is the second largest single gift in Bowie State's history. In 2025, she donated an additional $50 million which is the largest single gift in Bowie State's history.

== Academics ==
BSU has 29 undergraduate majors, 20 master's programs, 3 doctoral programs, and 20 certificate programs in disciplines as diverse as computer science, education, human resource development, organizational communication, and nursing. In partnership with the University of Maryland University College, it became the first historically black university to include overseas studies. It was also the first university in the nation to offer a bachelor's degree in paedology.

The university is home to The Maryland Center, a not-for-profit organization founded in 1998 providing community services. In partnership with the federal General Services Administration, the campus hosts the Bowie State University Telecommuting Center.

Bowie State University offers an honors program for academically talented and ambitious undergraduate students.

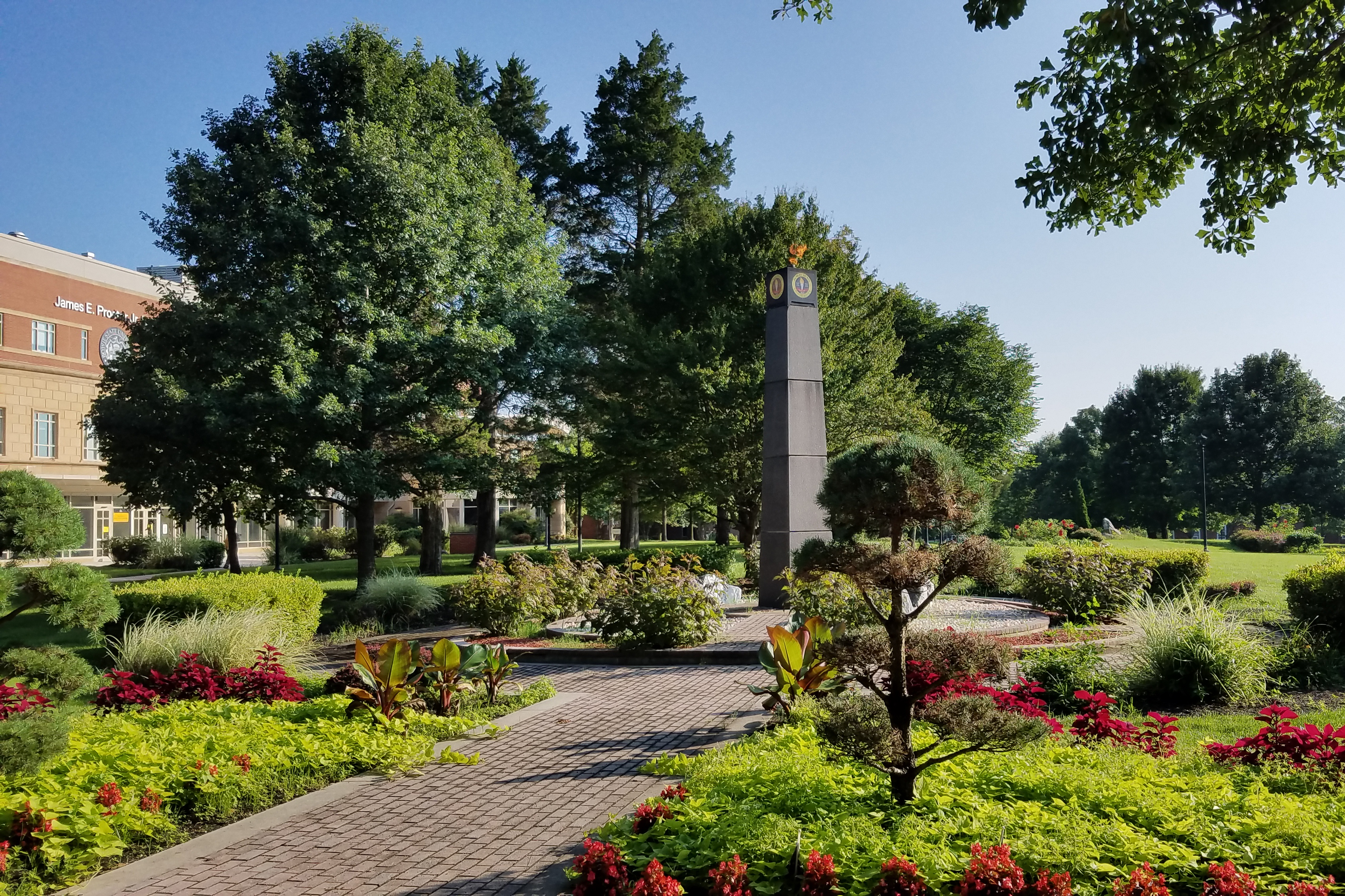
The Bowie State torch

These academic programs are offered in four colleges:

- College of Arts and Sciences
- College of Business
- College of Education
- College of Professional Studies

== Campus and facilities ==
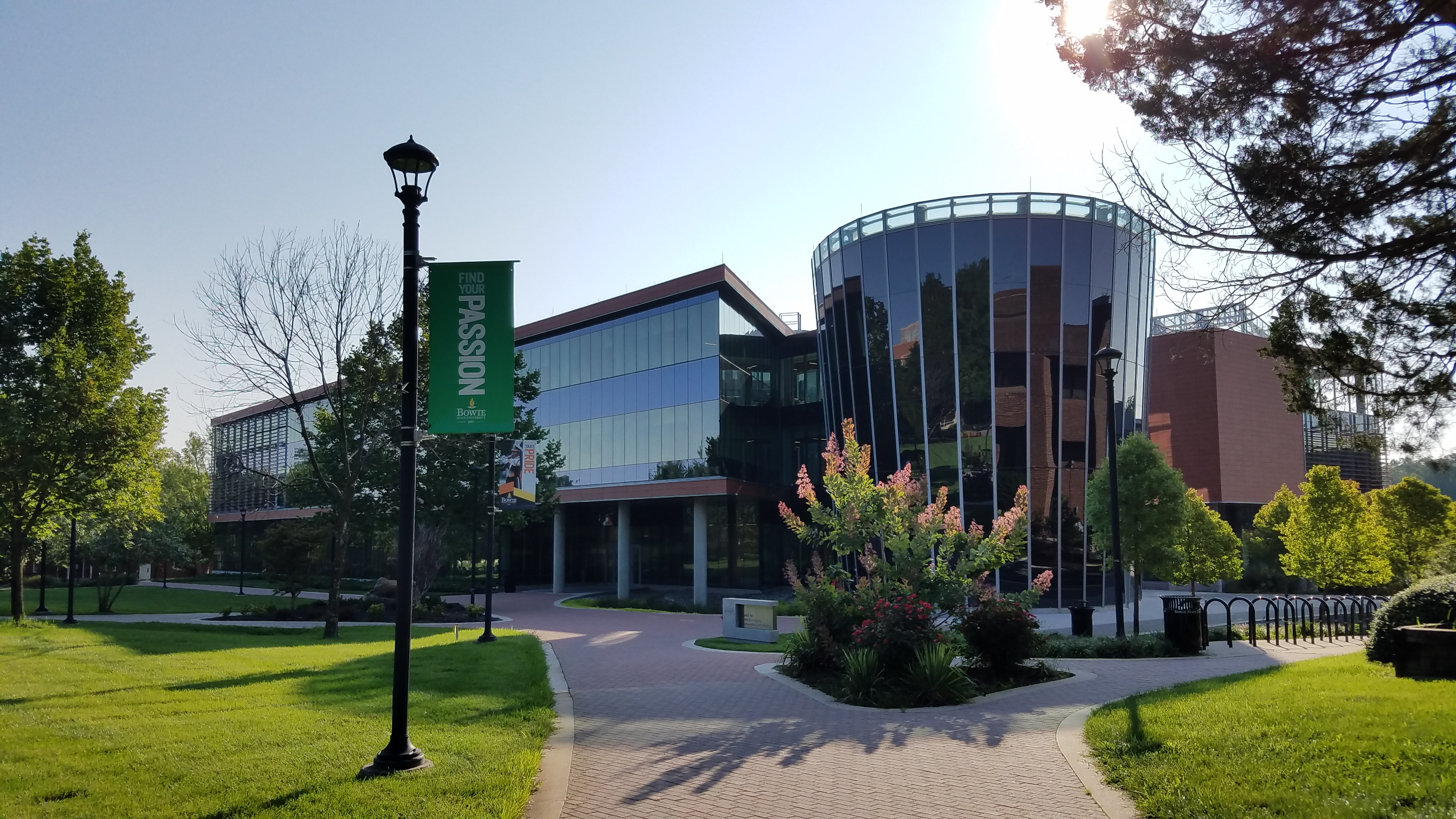
The Center for Natural Sciences, Mathematics and Nursing

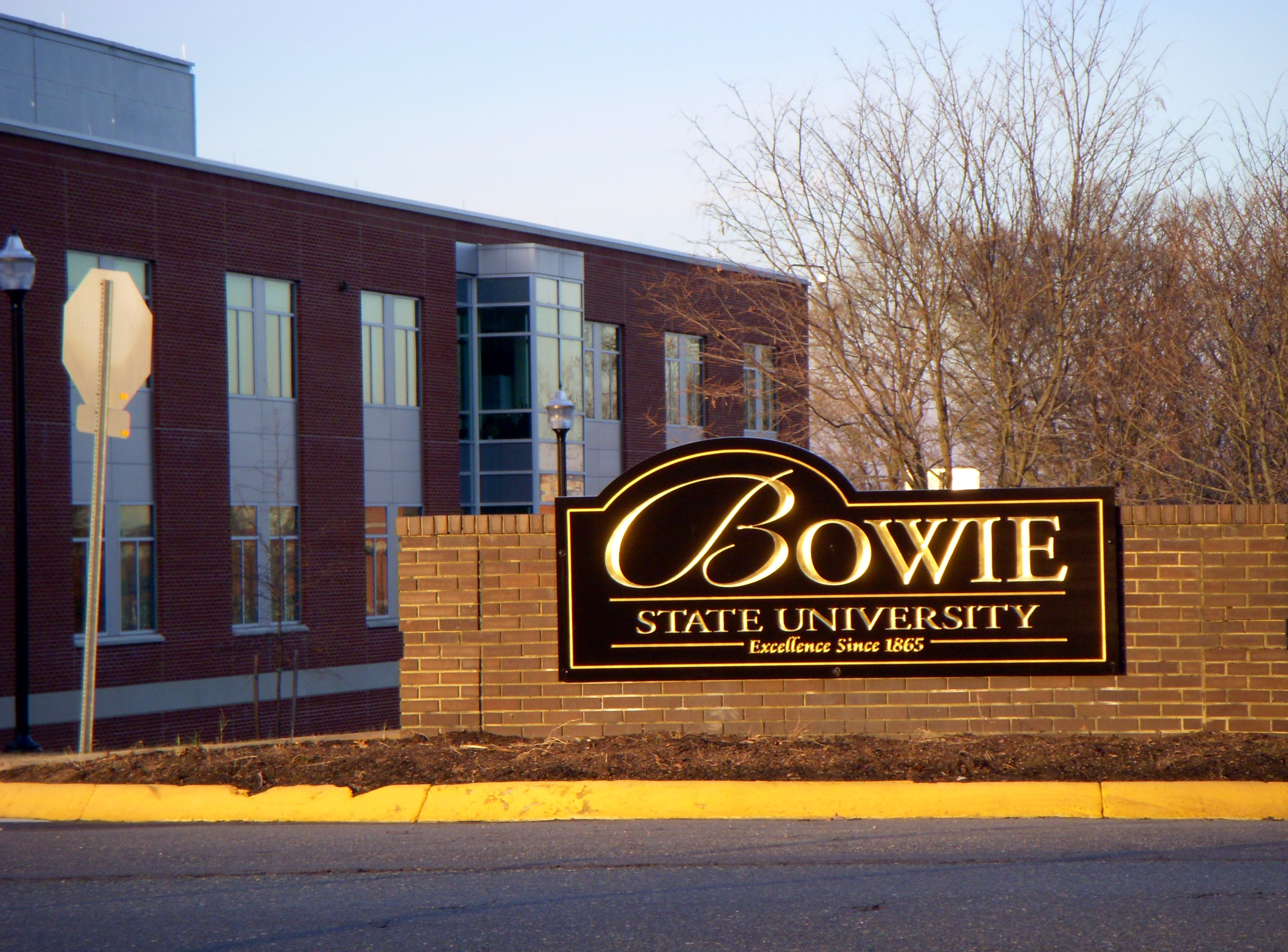
Gateway and sign

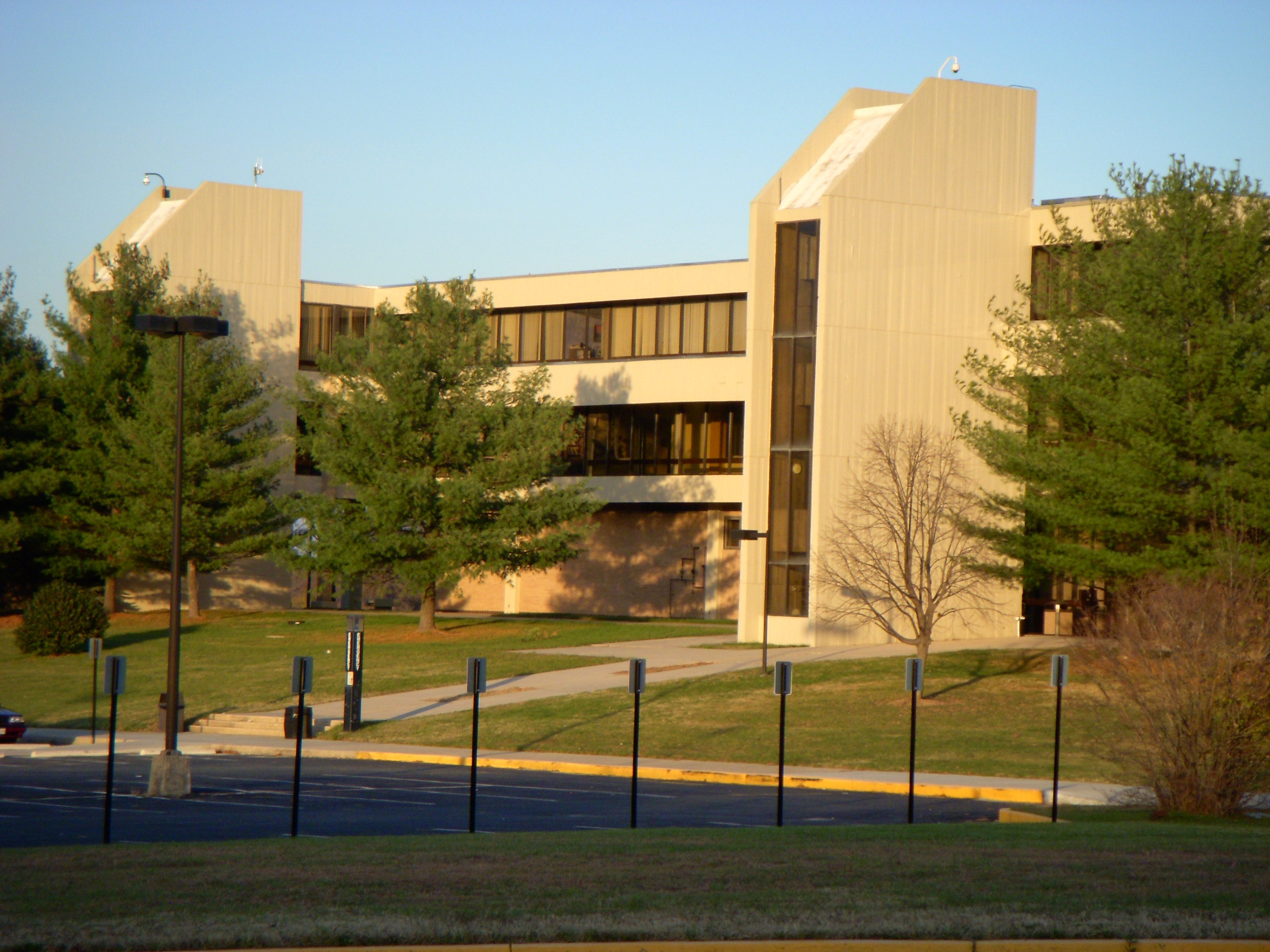
Martin Luther King Jr. Communications Art Center

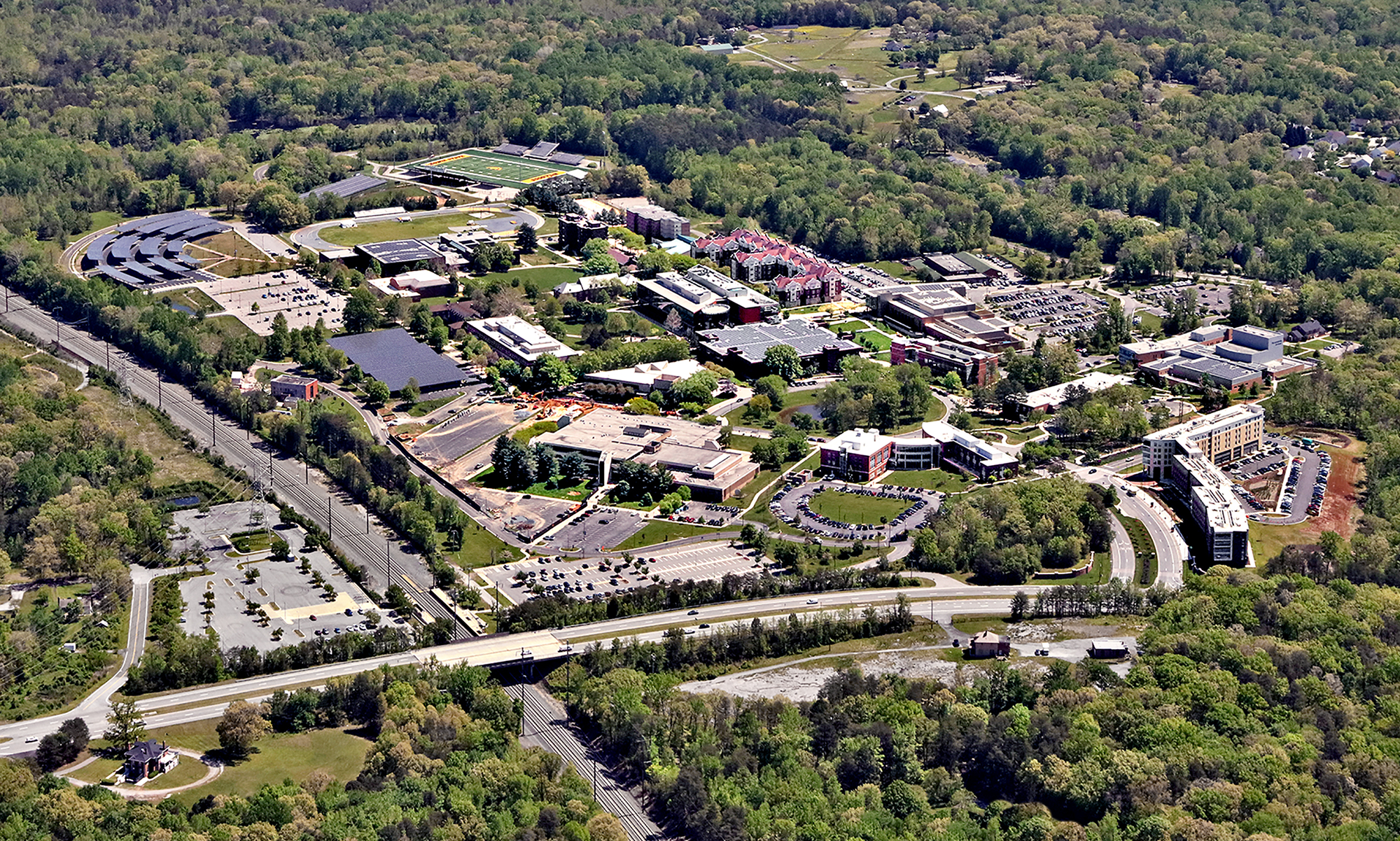
Aerial view of the campus

The campus comprises 23 buildings with more than 988,897 square feet (92,000 m^{2}) of space. It is located in Bowie, Maryland, between the metropolitan areas of Baltimore (25 miles) and Washington, D.C. (17 miles). An on-campus MARC Train station and Metrobus stops provide access to local transit. There are Wi-Fi and public computer labs across campus for student use.

Twenty-three percent of students live on campus in seven residence halls. Campus events include cultural performances, lectures, and sporting events. The oldest building still in use is Harriet Tubman Hall, built in 1921. The 85,000 sq ft (7,900 m^{2}) Student Union Building, which replaced the old Wiseman Center, was inaugurated in 2013. Other recent improvements to the campus have been the $71 million Fine & Performing Arts Center, with 123,000 square feet for art, music, dance, visual communication and digital media arts, and theater programs, replacing the former Martin Luther King, Jr., Arts Center.

The $17.6 million Center for Business and Graduate Studies houses the College of Business, Graduate School, Graduate Admissions Office, the BSU Entrepreneurship Academy, and the Bowie Business Innovation Center, the first business accelerator to open at a Maryland HBCU. Other facilities include the Christa McAuliffe Residential Community (CMRC) apartments, the Computer Science Building, a facility serving the computer science and computer technology programs, and the $6.5 million Center for Learning Technology (CLT), serving the College of Professional Studies.

On campus, the Bowie State Satellite Operations Control Center (BSOCC) is an orbiting satellite operation and control center allowing students to gain hands-on experience. In 2003, the center went fully operational. It is a joint venture operated by the university, the Honeywell Corporation, and NASA's Goddard Space Flight Center in Greenbelt, Maryland.

In September 2007, the university began negotiations with Prince George's County for the transfer of 214 acres (0.87 km^{2}) of land to the school. According to county documents, the land, valued at $1.3 million, would cost the university nothing if used "for educational uses including facilities that benefit the welfare of students and faculty in their educational experience at the University". Adding this land would increase the university's size by 63%. The main focus for the land is the development of additional student dorms. The land will also be used to establish several retail businesses that will cater to students and the community.

== Athletics ==
Bowie State's athletes compete in the Northern Division of the Central Intercollegiate Athletic Association, in the NCAA's Division II. They compete and/or train on-campus in Bulldog Stadium, the Leonidas S. James Physical Education Complex, and the A. C. Jordan Arena. The Bulldogs play the following sports:

- Basketball
- Bowling
- Cross Country
- Football
- Indoor Track & Field
- Outdoor Track & Field
- Softball
- Tennis
- Volleyball

In addition, BSU sponsors athletic clubs for students at the intramural and recreational levels. The Fitness Room in the Leonidas James Physical Education Complex also has open hours for students, faculty, and staff.

== Student life ==
Undergraduate demographics as of Fall 2023
Race and ethnicity	Total
Black	82%
Hispanic	6%
Two or more races	4%
White	3%
Unknown	2%
Asian	1%
International student	1%
Economic diversity
Low-income (Note: The percentage of students who received an income-based federal Pell grant intended for low-income students.)	48%
Affluent (Note: The percentage of students who are a part of the American middle class at the bare minimum.)	52%

Bowie State has many academic clubs, fraternities, honor societies, organizations, sororities, and student associations. The computer, education, French, and history clubs are examples of academic clubs. The art guild, concert and marching bands, jazz and brass ensembles, and others allow students to explore the fine and performing arts.

=== Media ===
As of 2017, Bowie State had one student newspaper: The Spectrum.

BSU-TV Channel 74 is a cable television station that broadcasts around the clock for the BSU community, and WBSU Bulldog Nation Radio streams programming online. Both stations are operated under the aegis of the Department of Communications. They have converted from analog to digital technology. WBSU Bulldog Nation Radio was launched in 2018 with support from Maryland-based Radio One.

The university is a supporter of the Prince George's Film Festival.

=== Music ===
The Symphony of Soul, also known as SOS, is the name of the marching/concert/pep band at Bowie State University. During the fall, students always expect the usual impromptu parade through the campus by the SOS. They were also a part of the NFL 2007–2008 season opener as they performed the National Anthem with Aretha Franklin and shared the stage with other recording artists such as Aerosmith, Britney Spears, Mary J. Blige, and others. The SOS was featured in the Original Battle of the Bands held at RFK Stadium. The SOS drumline was named as one of Showtime Magazine's top ten amongst HBCUs.

== Notable alumni ==
- Jovan Adepo – actor
- Olubowale Victor Akintimehin, attended 2004 but not graduated – rapper, stage name Wale
- Joanne C. Benson, B.S. 1961 – Maryland State Senator
- Toni Braxton, attended but not graduated – singer, songwriter
- Trina Braxton Businesswoman, restaurantuer, actress, singer, songwriter
- Towanda Braxton – singer, songwriter, and member of the singing group The Braxtons
- Gwendolyn T. Britt, B.S. 2004 – Maryland State Senator
- Henry Frazier, III, B.S. 1993, M.A. 1999 – head football coach at Bowie State University, Prairie View A&M University, and North Carolina Central University
- Myles Frost, B.A. 2023 – actor, singer, dancer, musician, Tony Award winner for MJ the Musical
- Eunique Jones Gibson, B.S. 2007 – content creator, director, and speaker
- Andrea Harrison, B.A. 2003 – politician
- Delano Johnson – football player in the NFL and CFL
- Christa McAuliffe, M.A. 1978 – Teacher-astronaut killed in Challenger space shuttle accident
- Susie Proctor, B.S. 1962, M.A. 1973 – Maryland State Delegate
- Isaac Redman – former American football player
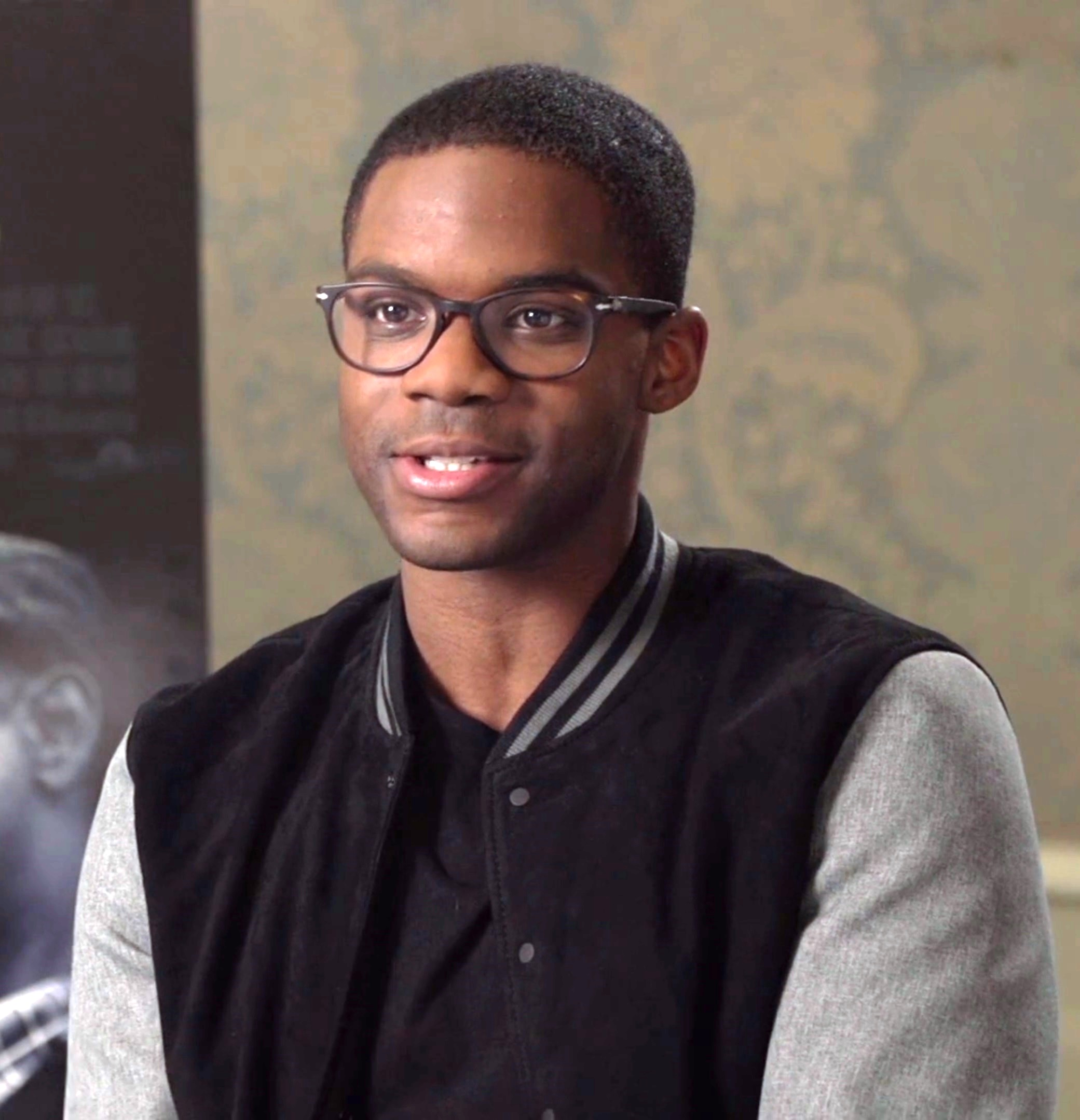
Jovan Adepo

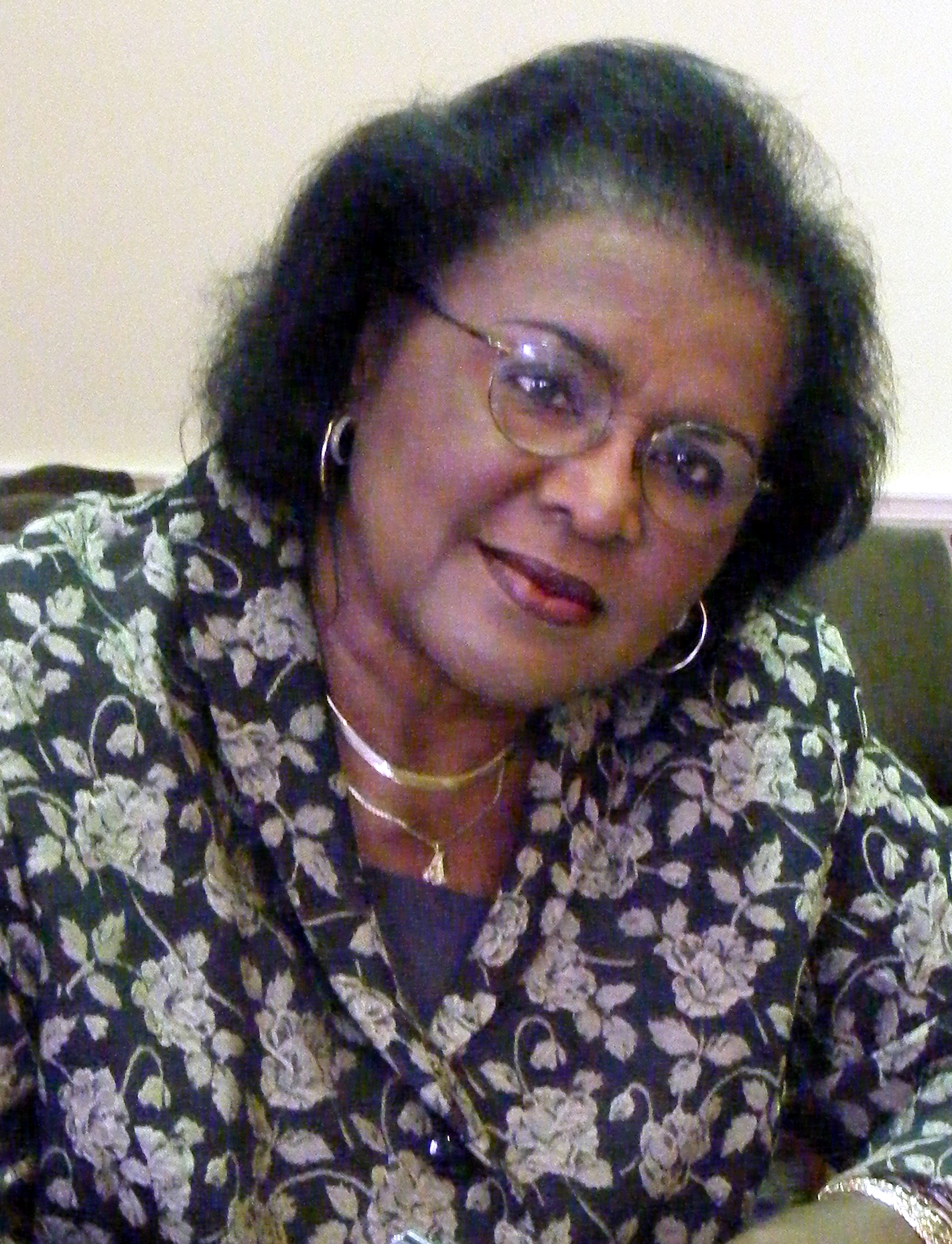
Joanne C. Benson

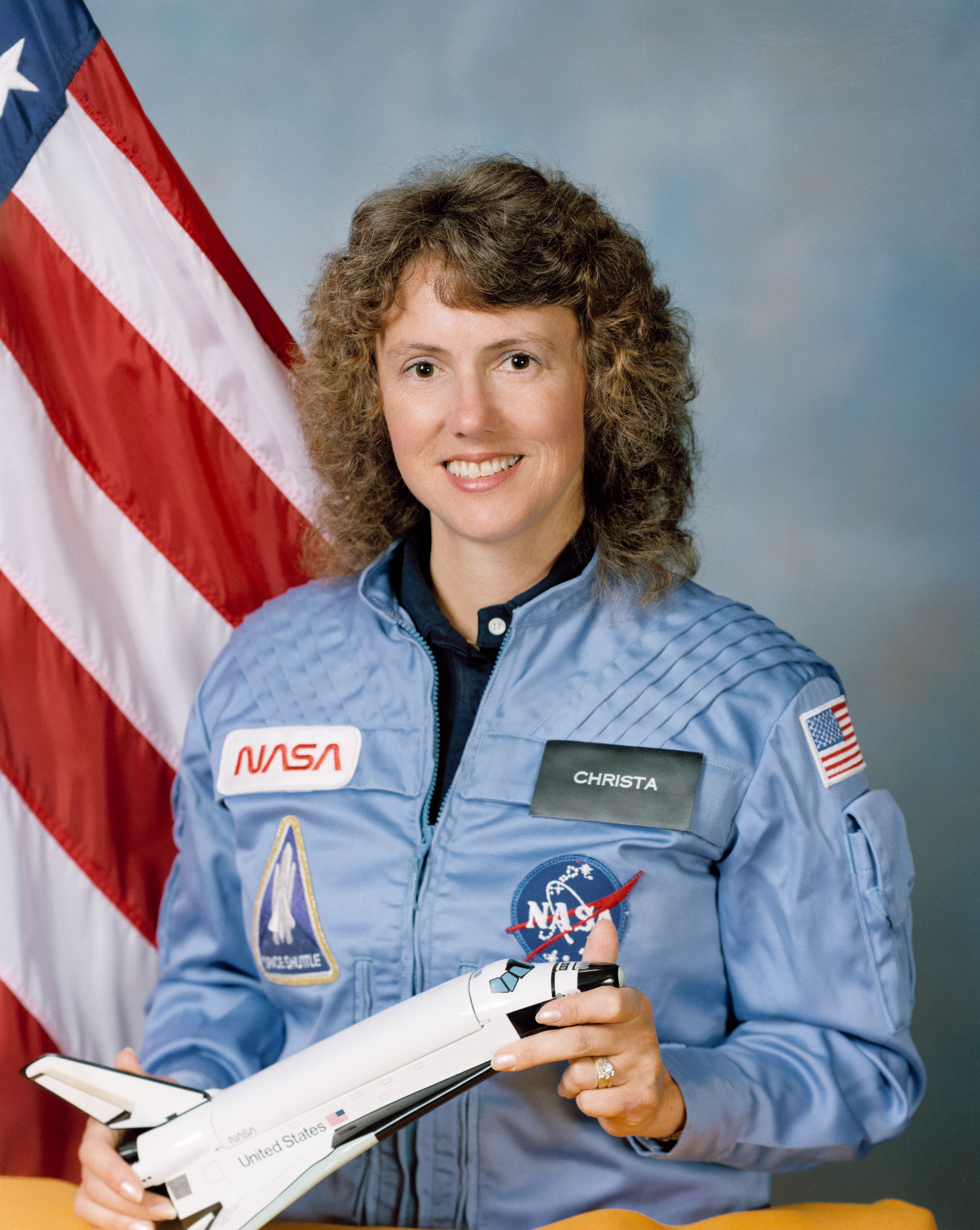
Christa McAuliffe

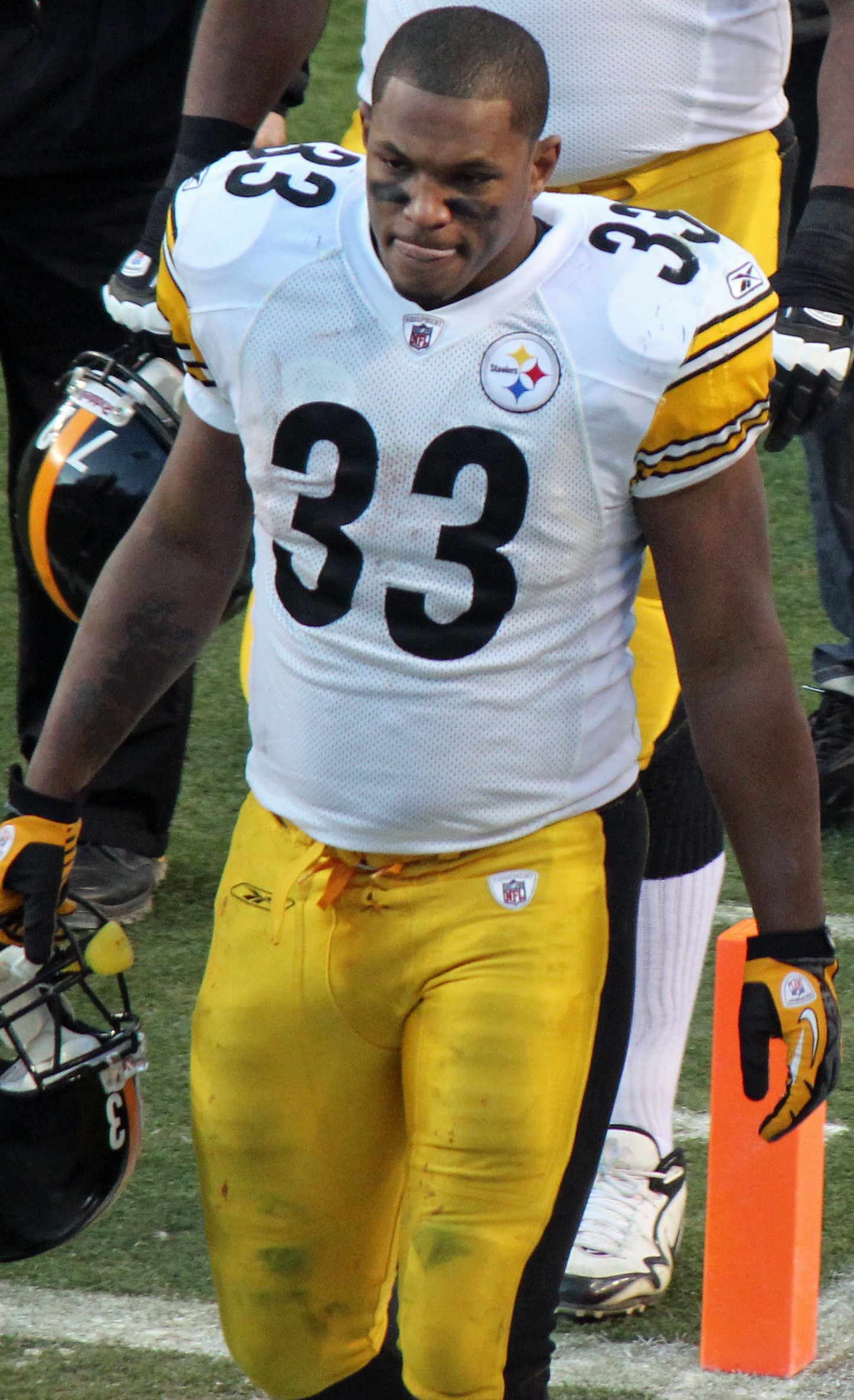
Isaac Redman

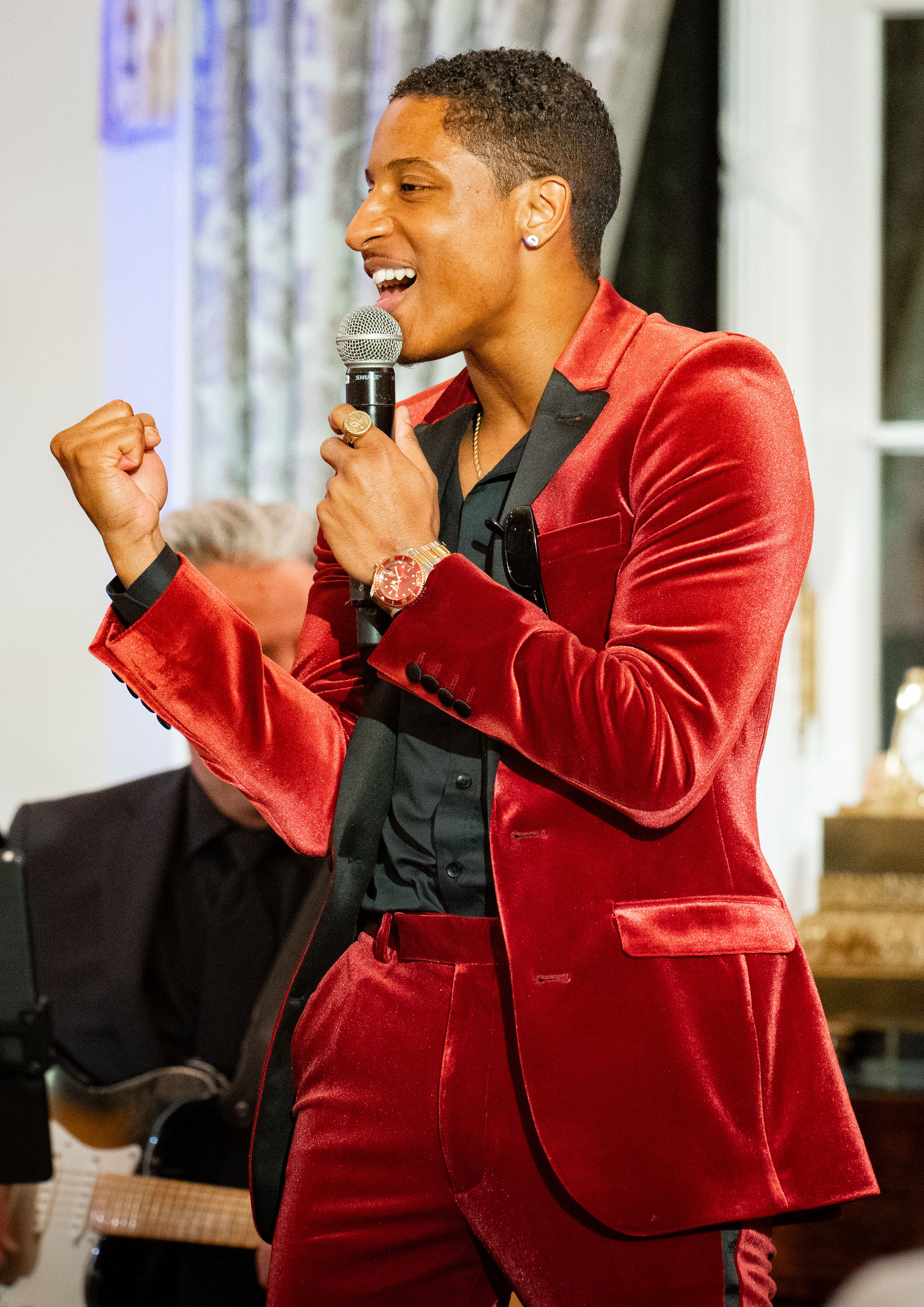
Myles Frost
