= Aminta H. Breaux =

American psychologist and academic administrator (born 1959)

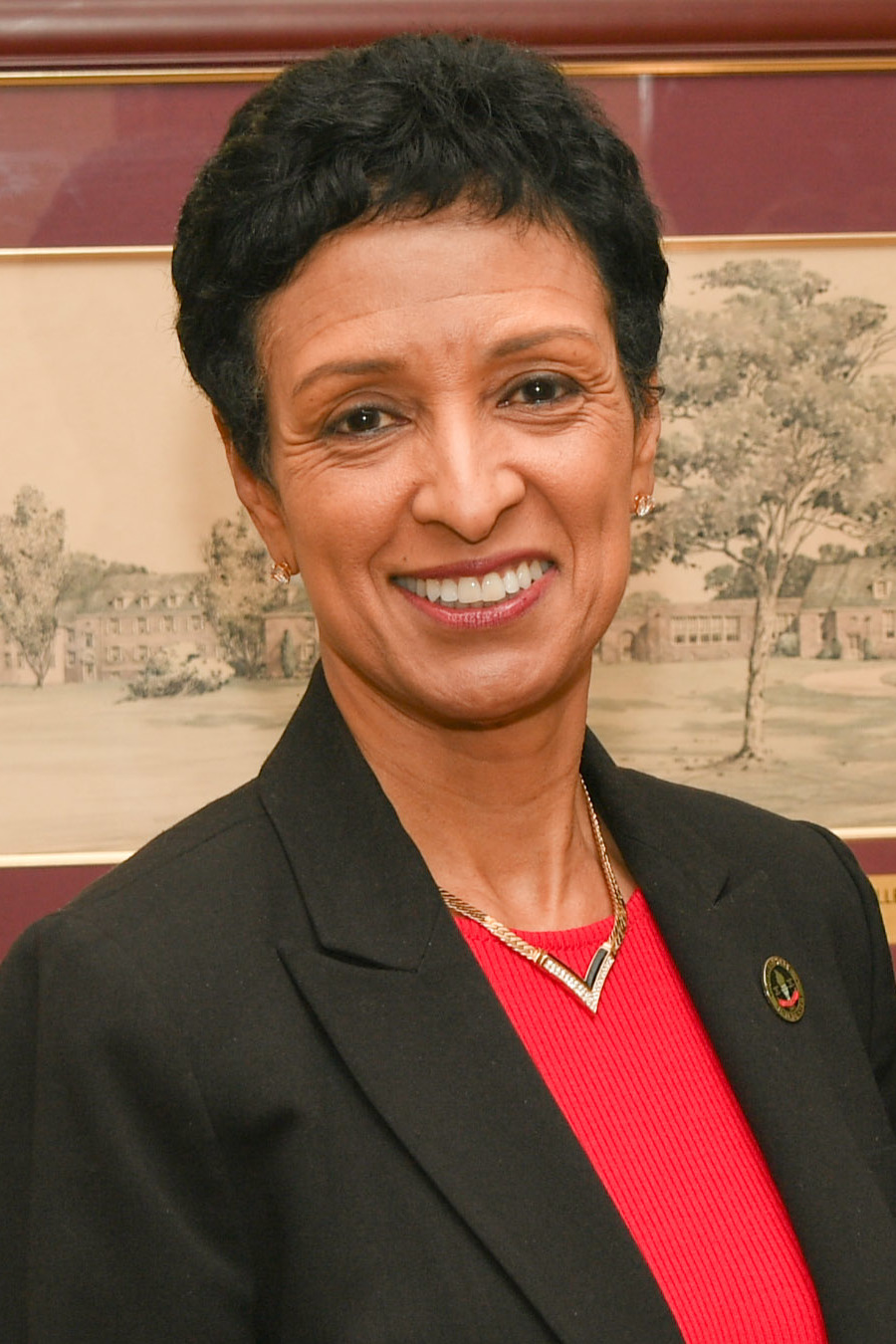
- Breaux in 2018

President of Bowie State University
- Incumbent
- Assumed office July 1, 2017

Personal details
- Born: February 11, 1959 (age 67) Philadelphia, Pennsylvania, U.S.
- Children: 3
- Education: Temple University; University of Pennsylvania; Harvard Graduate School of Education

Aminta H. Breaux (born February 11, 1959) is an American psychologist and academic administrator. She is the 10th president of Bowie State University. Breaux previously held leadership positions at Millersville University of Pennsylvania, University of the Sciences, and Drexel University.

== Biography ==
Breaux was born February 11, 1959, in Philadelphia. She earned a B.A. in psychology from Temple University in 1980. Breaux earned a M.S. in psychological services in education from the University of Pennsylvania in 1986. She later earned a Ph.D. in counseling psychology from Temple University in 2004. She graduated from the Harvard Graduate School of Education's executive management program.

Breaux was a career counselor at the University of Pennsylvania. She worked at Drexel University as the director of its career services center from 1990 to 1995 and director of the career management center from 1995 to 1998. From 1998 to 2000, Breaux was an assistant provost at Drexel University where she oversaw experiential learning and service-learning programs.

Breaux was the dean of students at the University of the Sciences from 2000 to 2008. She joined the Millersville University of Pennsylvania in 2008 as its vice president for student affairs. She was promoted to vice president for advancement and served in the role from 2014 to 2017. She was the interim vice-president for development and alumni relations in 2014. On July 1, 2017, Breaux became the 10th president of Bowie State University.

== Personal life ==
Breaux is married to Melvin and together, they have three daughters.
