= Marie Bérard =

Canadian violinist

- Born: 1962 (age 63–64); Trois-Rivières, Quebec
- Genres: Classical music
- Occupation: Concertmaster
- Instrument: 1767 Pietro Landolfi violin
- Years active: 1982-present
- Member of: Canadian Opera Company, ARC Ensemble, Trio Arkel
- Formerly of: Toronto Symphony Orchestra, Mainly Mozart
- Website: www.marieberard.ca

Marie Bérard is a French-Canadian violinist, best known as the concertmaster of the Canadian Opera Company (COC) Orchestra.

== Early life and education ==
Bérard was born in Trois-Rivières in 1962, and educated at Collège Marie de L’Incarnation, the Conservatoire de musique du Québec à Trois-Rivières, and the University of Toronto Faculty of Music, where she studied with David Zafer.

In 1982, at the age of 20 and still in her second year of studies with Zafer, Bérard made her debut with the Toronto Symphony Orchestra (TSO) at Massey Hall, playing Felix Mendelssohn’s Concerto in E Minor, Op. 64 on a 1717 Stradivarius violin; it was reported to have been the first time that particular instrument had been played by a student.

== Career ==
In 1989, Bérard was appointed concertmaster of the COC Orchestra; she has held that chair since.

Until 2025, she was also Associate Concertmaster of the Mainly Mozart Festival in San Diego.

In addition to her permanent chairs, she is a noted interpreter of contemporary classical music, performing with Art of Time Ensemble, Esprit Orchestra, Amici, Array Music, and New Music Concerts, and has performed at international festivals including Domaine Forget, Strings Music Festival, Ottawa Chamberfest, and The Blair Atholl Festival in Scotland.

With TSO cellist Winona Zelenka, Bérard co-founded Trio Arkel (now Arkel Chamber Concerts) in 2008.

During the COC’s search for a new music director that same year, she led the company’s orchestra in championing the hiring of Johannes Debus, after he had conducted their performance of Prokofiev’s 1946 opera War and Peace; Alexander Neef, then general director of the COC, “famously” ended the search early and “immediately offered [Debus] the job.”

Bérard teaches at the University of Toronto Faculty of Music, The Royal Conservatory of Music, The Glenn Gould School, and the National Youth Orchestra of Canada.
