= Bérard d'Albret, Lord of Vayres =

Bérard d’Albret, lord of Vayres and Vertheuil (died 1346) was a cadet member of the House of Albret in Gascony and an English commander during the Hundred Years War.

He was the son of Amanieu VIII and younger brother of Bernard Ezi IV.

Bérard remained a supporter of the English side after the War of Saint-Sardos in 1324 when many of his family defected to the French.

At the onset of the Hundred Years’ War, in 1337, he was captain of Blaye and Puynormand on the northern march of what remained of the Duchy of Aquitaine.

On 20 April 1339 a French force transported by galleys attacked Blaye from the river side. The defenders were caught completely by surprise and both town and citadel was taken. Bérard was captured and brought as a prisoner to the Temple in Paris.

By 1345 he was back in Gascony serving with his older brother Bernard Ezi IV under Henry of Grosmont, Earl of Lancaster. In August Lancaster captured Bergerac, the principal French garrison town in Périgord, by storm. When the Earl marched onward on 10 September he left the brothers in command of the town with a force of 1,500 men.
