= Jean Béraud =

French painter (1849–1935)

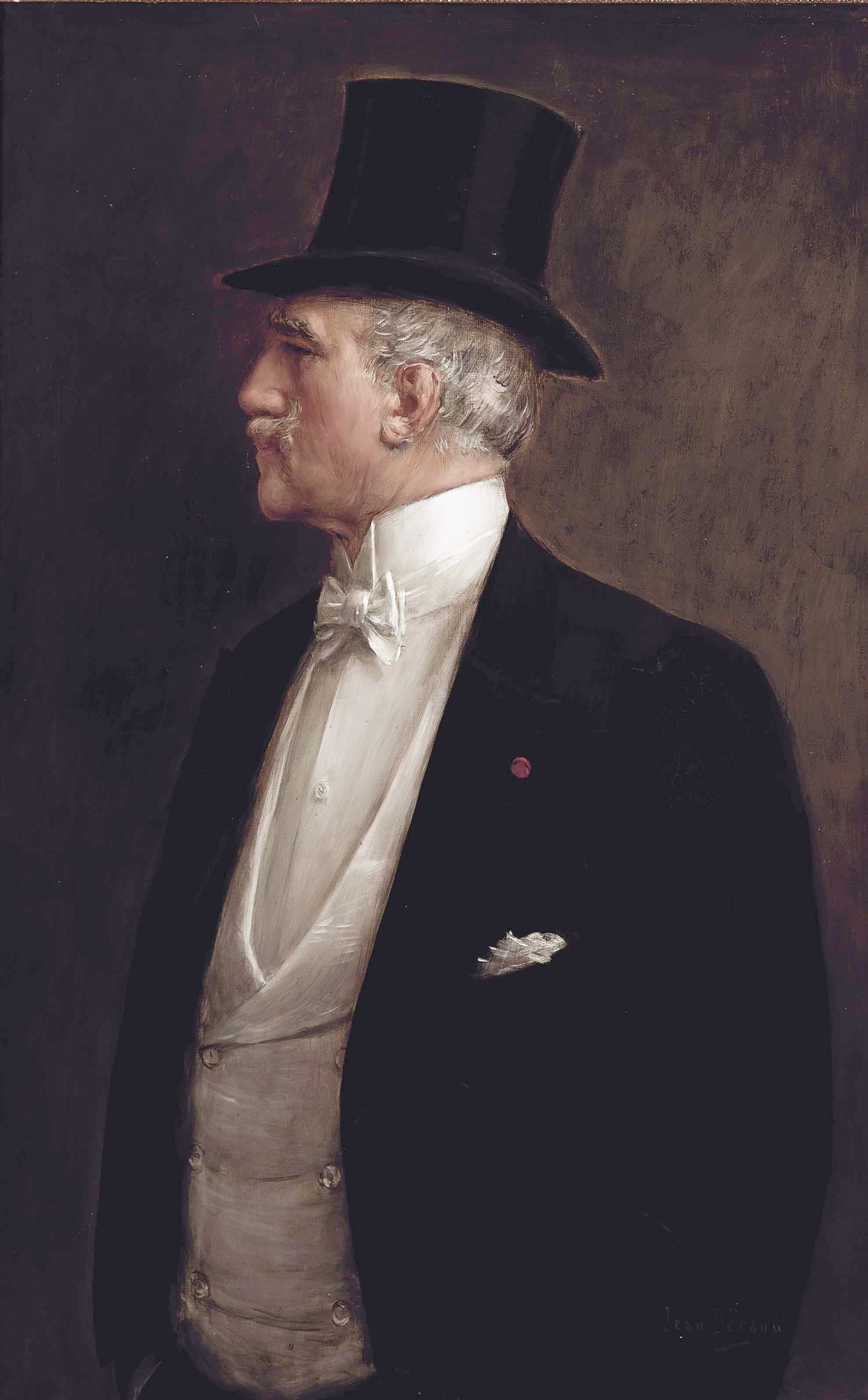
- Self-portrait (ca. 1909)
- Born: Saint Petersburg
- Died: 4 October 1935 (aged 86); Paris
- Resting place: Montparnasse Cemetery
- Education: Salon (Paris)
- Known for: Depictions of Paris life
- Awards: Legion of Honour (1894)

Jean Béraud (French: [beʁo]; 12 January 1849 – 4 October 1935) was a French painter renowned for his numerous paintings of life in Paris and especially its nightlife. His works depicting the Champs-Élysées, cafés, Montmartre and the banks of the Seine are precisely detailed illustrations of everyday Parisian life during the Belle Époque. He also painted religious subjects in a contemporary setting.

== Biography ==
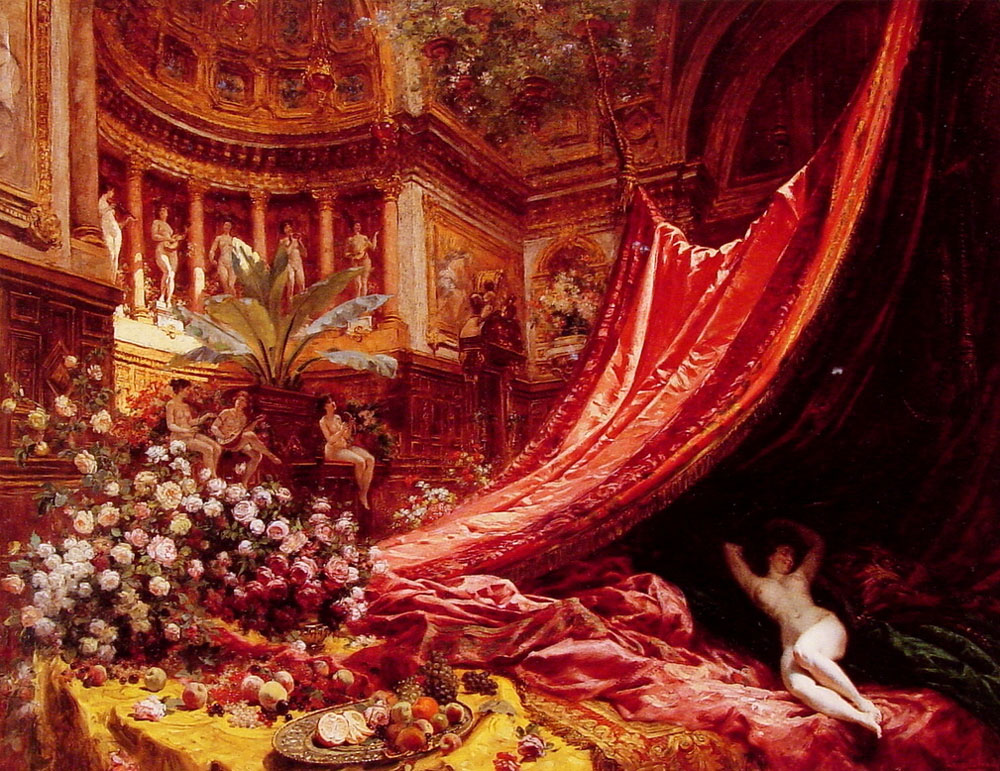
Symphony in Red and Gold

Béraud was born on 12 January 1849 in Saint Petersburg. His father, also called Jean, was a sculptor and was likely working on the site of St. Isaac's Cathedral at the time of his son's birth. Béraud's mother was Geneviève Eugénie Jacquin. Following the death of Béraud's father, the family moved to Paris. Béraud was in the process of being educated as a lawyer until the occupation of Paris during the Franco-Prussian War in 1870.

Béraud became a student of Léon Bonnat and exhibited his paintings at the Paris Salon for the first time in 1872. He did not gain recognition until 1876, with his painting On the Way Back from the Funeral. He exhibited with the Society of French Watercolorists at the 1889 World's Fair in Paris.

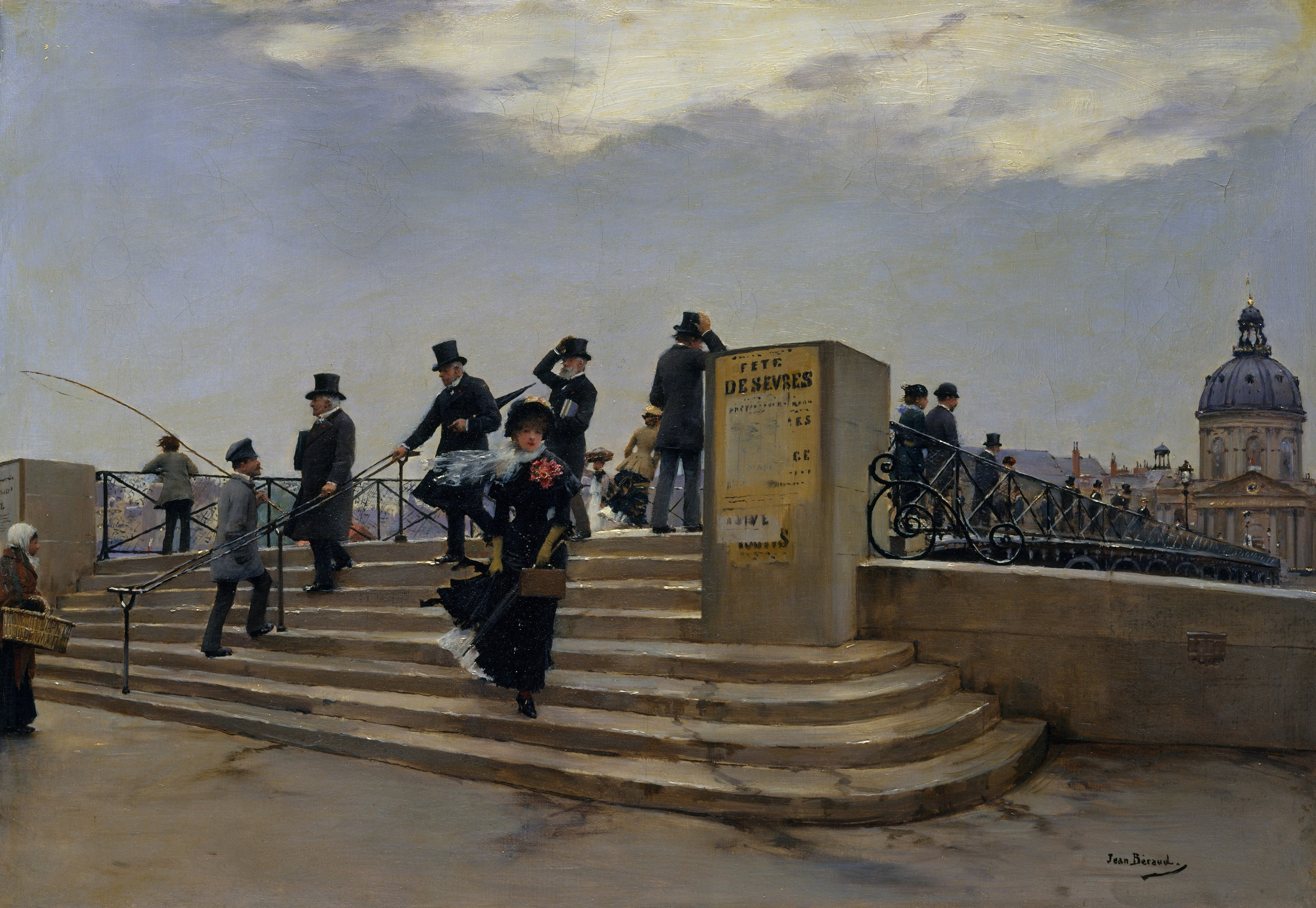
A Windy Day on the Pont des Arts

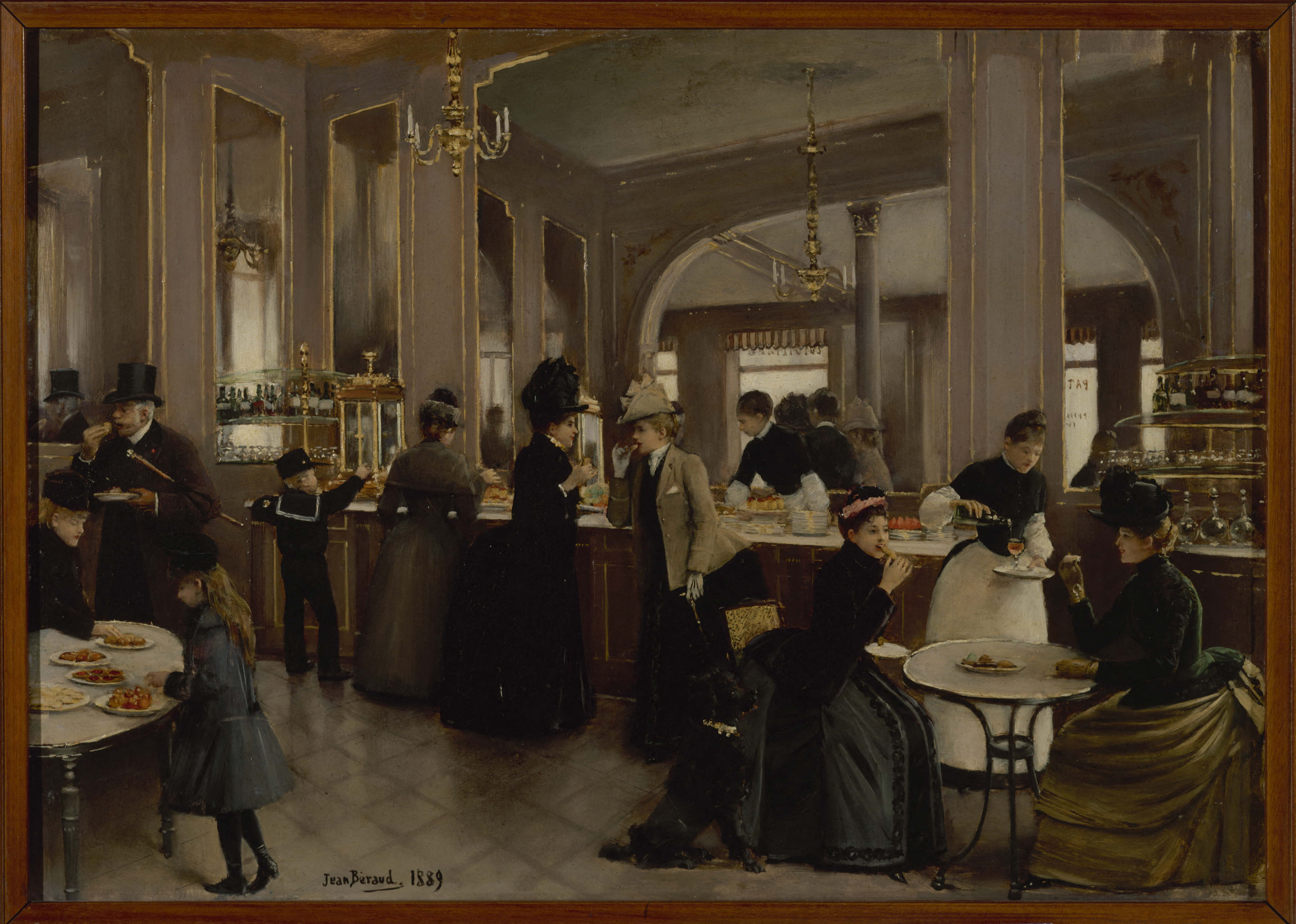
Café Gloppe

He painted many scenes of Parisian daily life during the Belle Époque in a style that stands somewhere between the academic art of the Salon and that of the Impressionists. He received the Légion d'honneur in 1894.

Béraud's paintings often included truth-based humour and mockery of late 19th-century Parisian life, along with frequent appearances of biblical characters in contemporary situations. Paintings such as Mary Magdalene in the House of the Pharisees aroused controversy when exhibited, because of such settings.

Toward the end of the 19th century, Béraud dedicated less time to his own painting but worked on numerous exhibition committees, including the Salon de la Société Nationale. Béraud never married and had no children. He died in Paris on 4 October 1935 and is buried in Montparnasse Cemetery beside his mother.

== Style ==
Béraud was popular in France and was appreciated by Guy de Maupassant who called him "adorable's adversaries" (Le plus charmant des fantaisistes).

His work was completely ignored by art historians of the period. After the Revolution, Russian artists received Béraud's work with irony, seeing them as the embodiment of Western commercial consumption, indulging, in their opinion, in the bourgeois tastes of the rich middle-class. Painting style gradually shifted from academic towards impressionism. While the major Impressionists fled the chaotic milieu of Paris and painted landscapes of the surrounding areas, Béraud, like his friend Édouard Manet (1832–1883), and in some of his paintings, Edgar Degas (1834–1917), depicted the busy environment of late-nineteenth-century urban life. Artistic techniques used by Béraud, in particular when drawing the so-called À la salle Graffard, were later adopted by other artists. The upper part of the picture is hidden in a light haze, the spectators are depicted in the foreground enthusiastically responding to the speech, while the Anarchist speakers stand out against a darker background.

== Gallery ==
Jean Béraud's Paris scenes

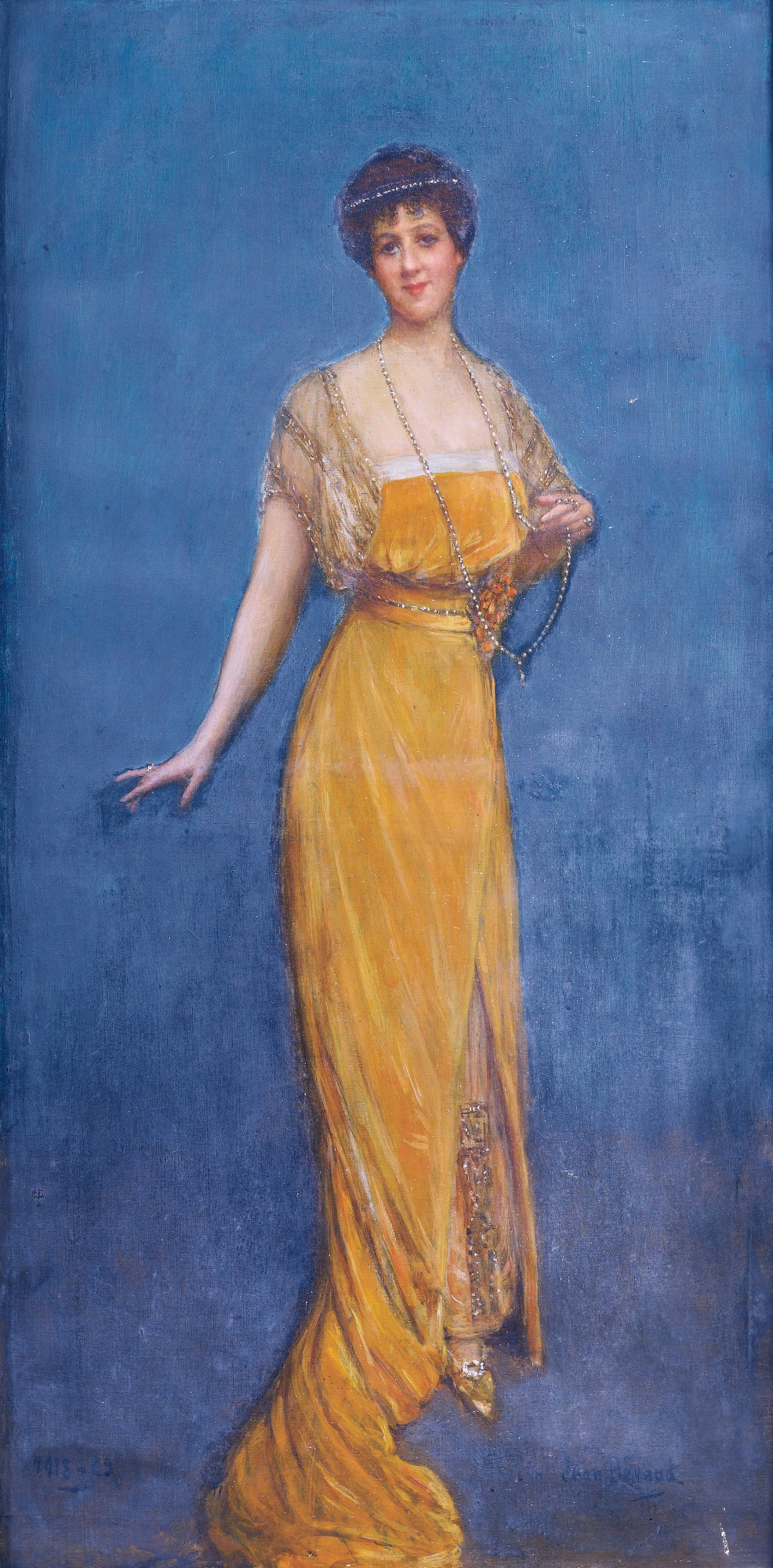
Blanche Vesnić (née Ulman)

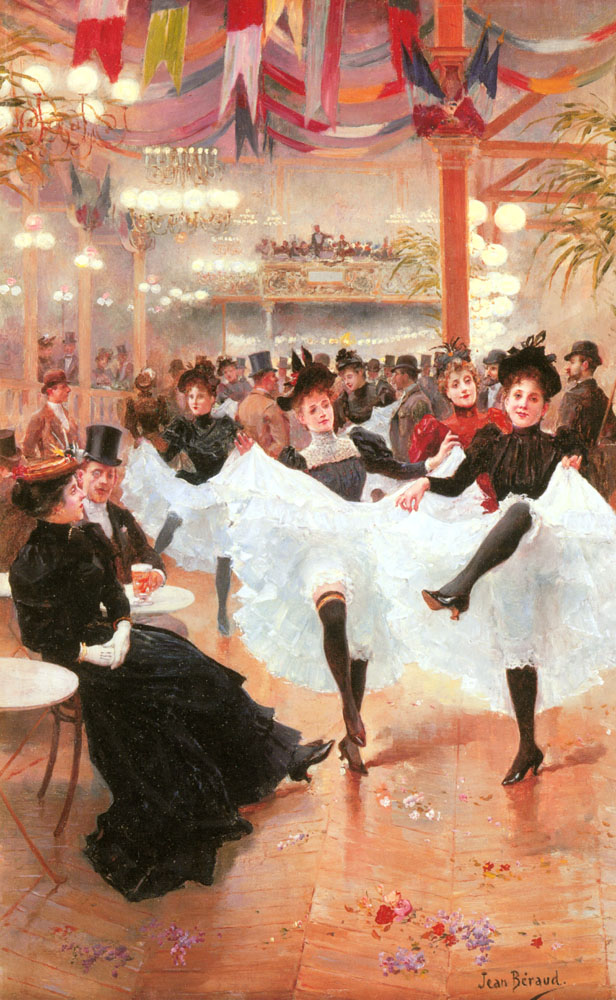
Le Café de Paris

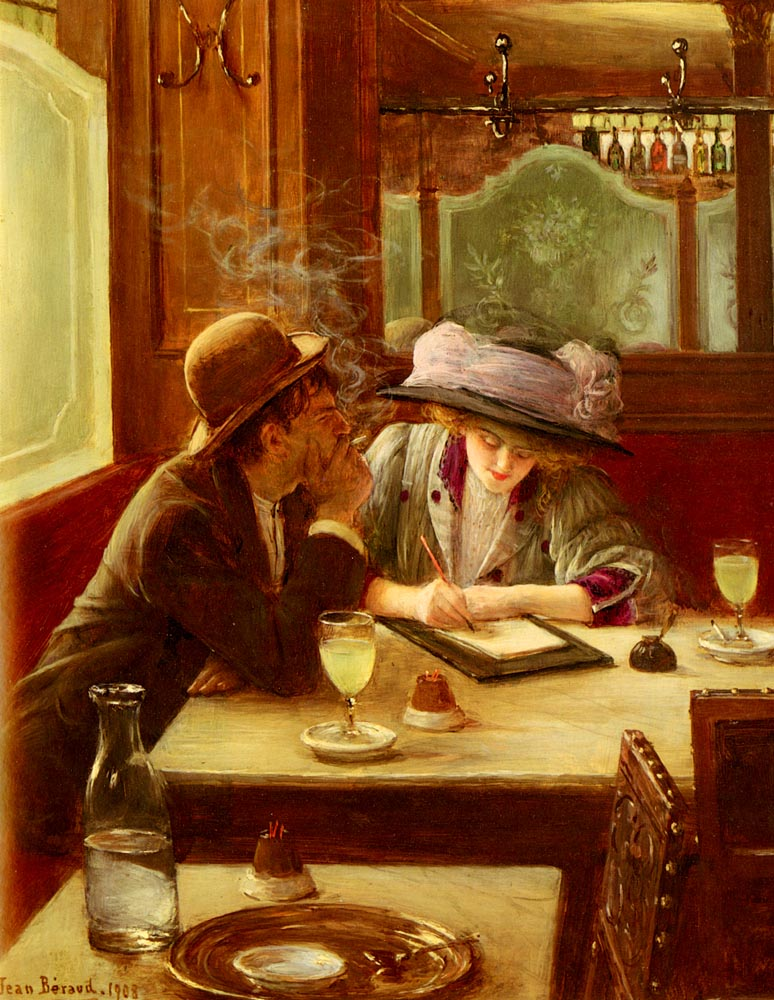
La Lettre

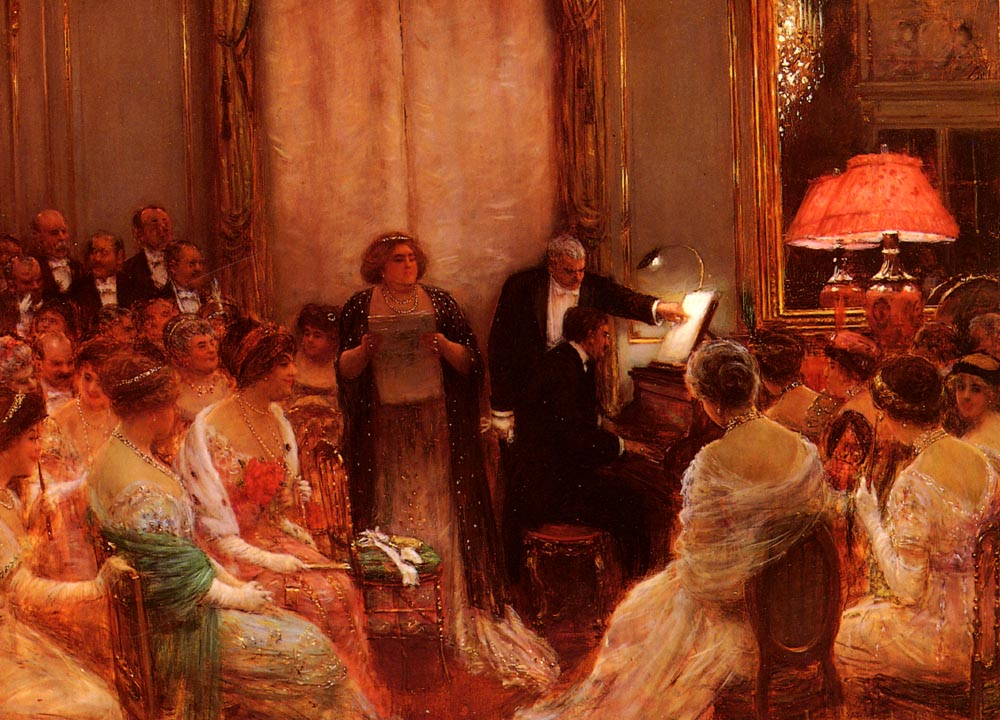
Personnages

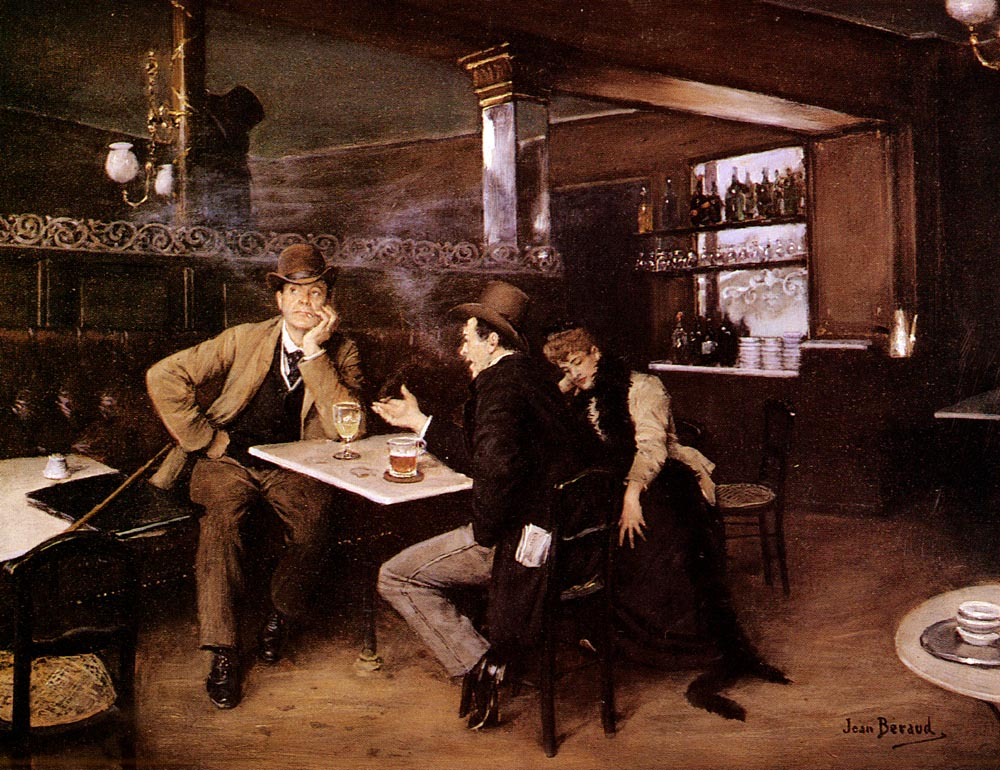
Au Bistro

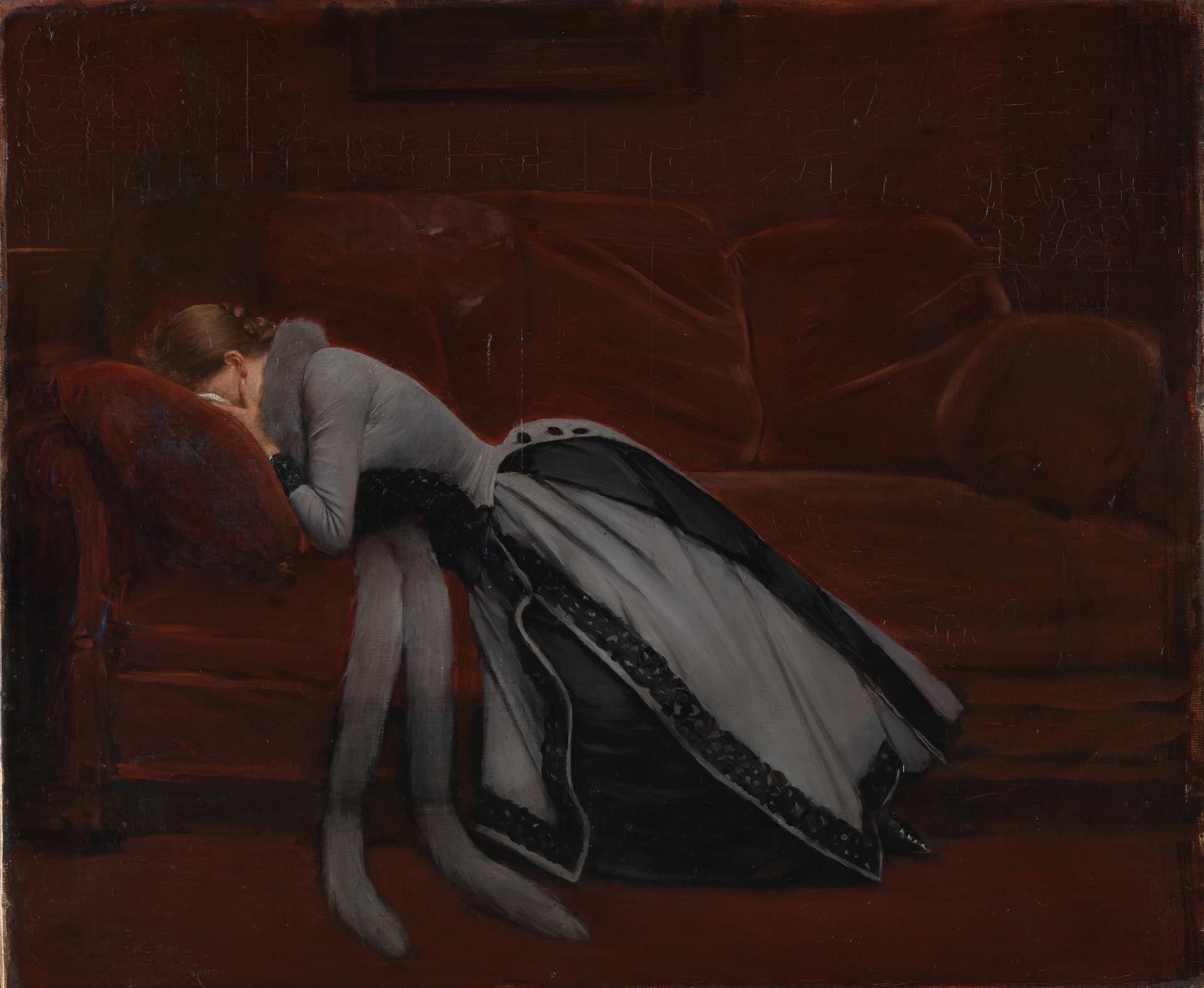
Après la faute

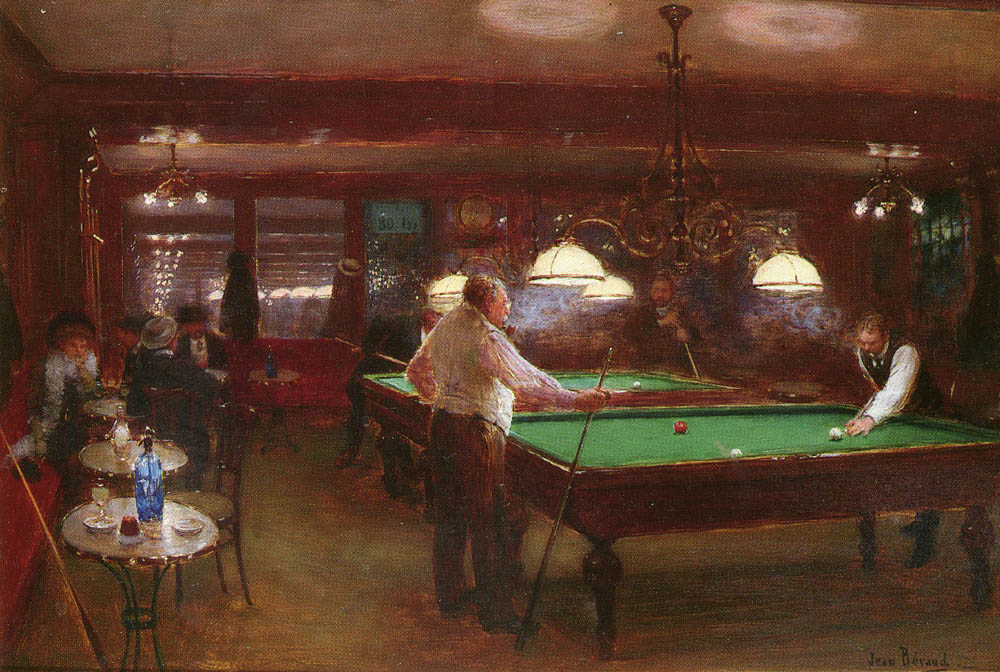
La Partie De Billard

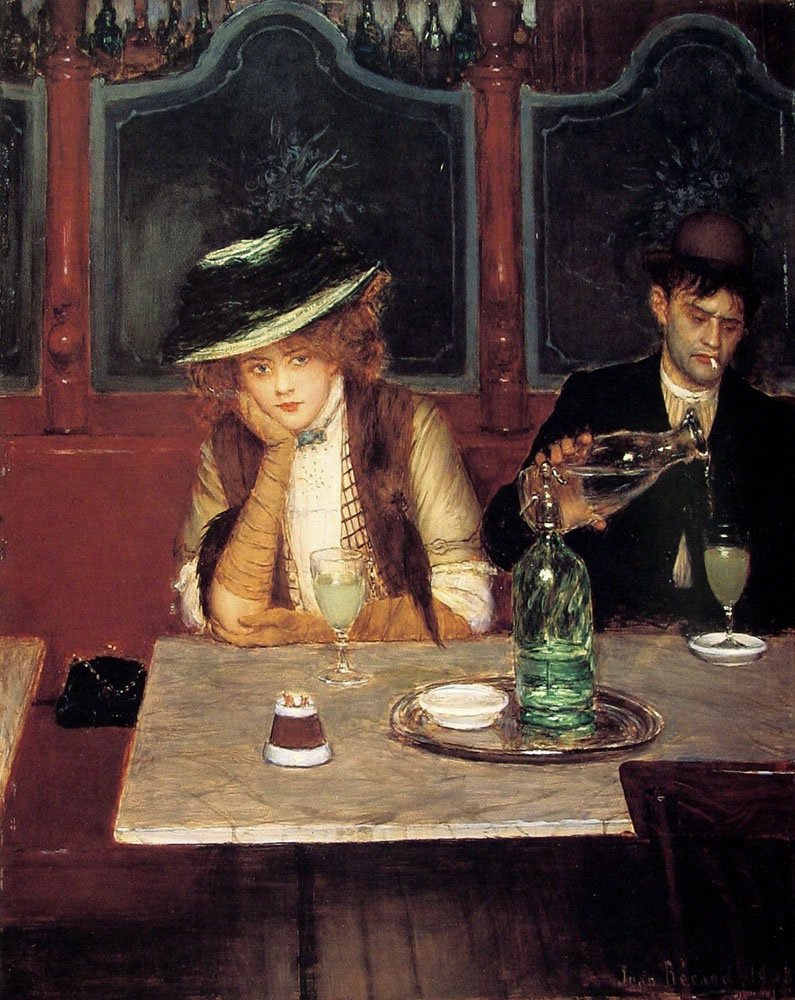
The Drinkers

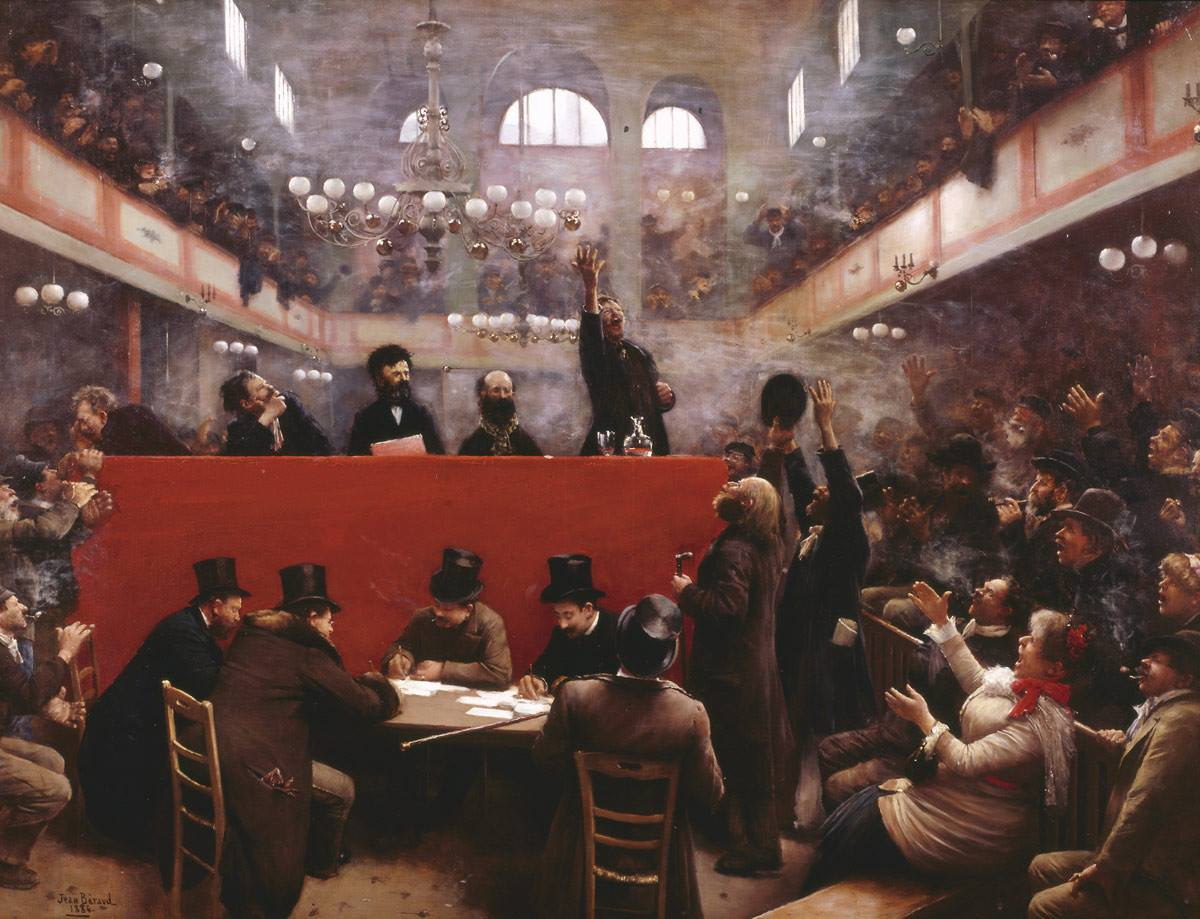
À la salle Graffard

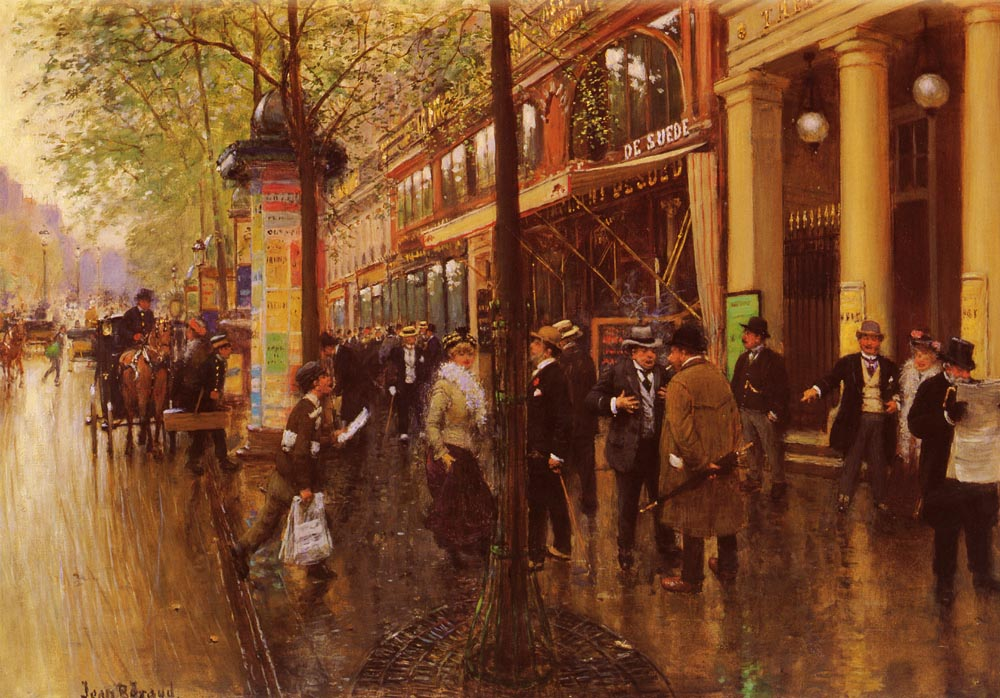
Les Grands Boulevards: Le Théâtre des Variétés

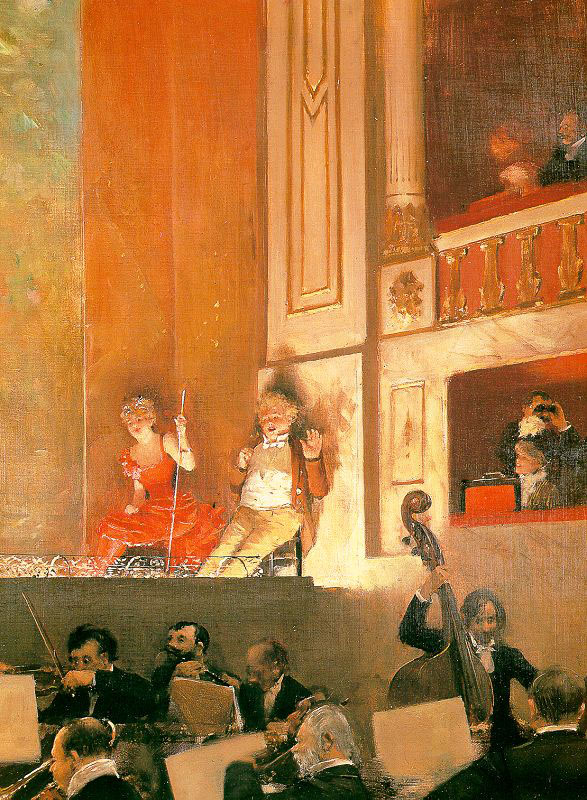
Representation of the Théâtre des Variétés
Jean Béraud's Paris cityscapes

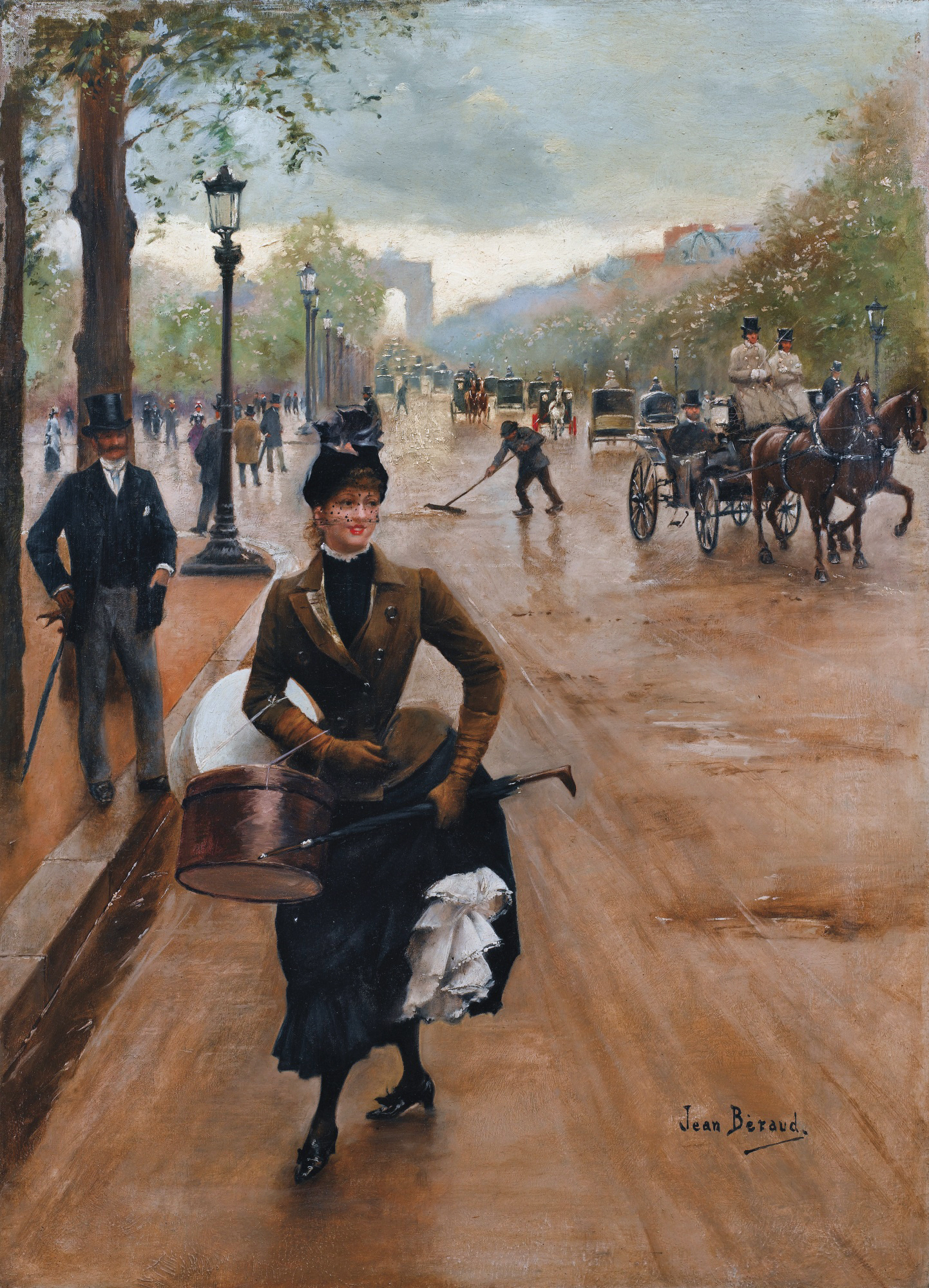
The Milliner on the Champs Elysées

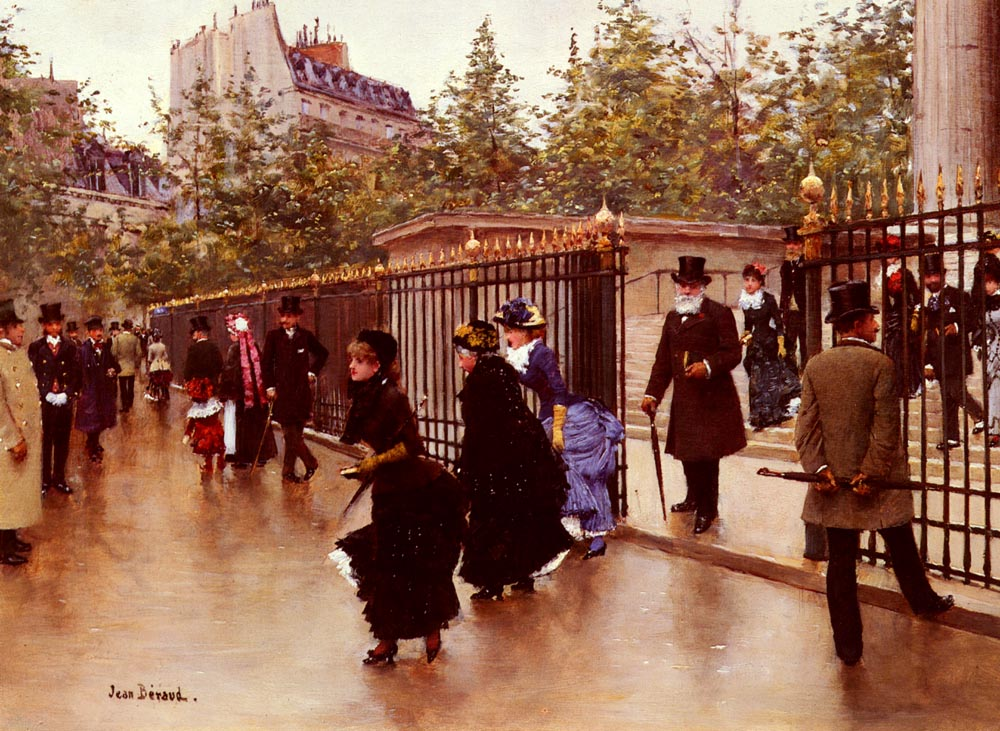
Sortant De La Madeleine, Paris

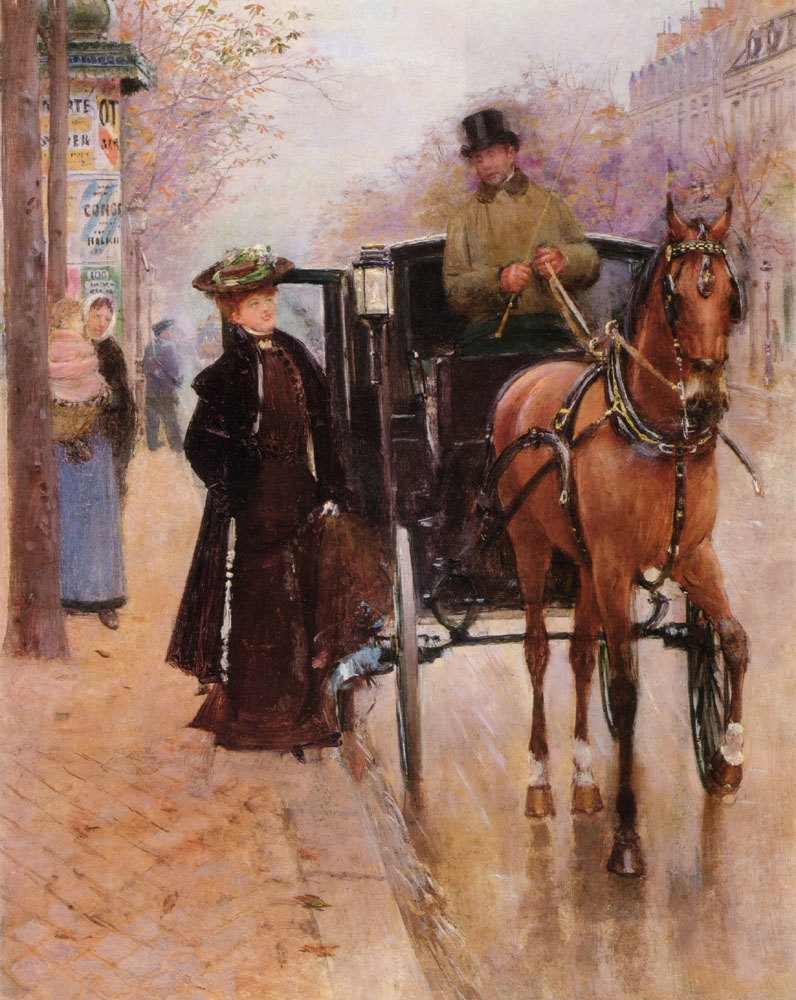
Home, Driver

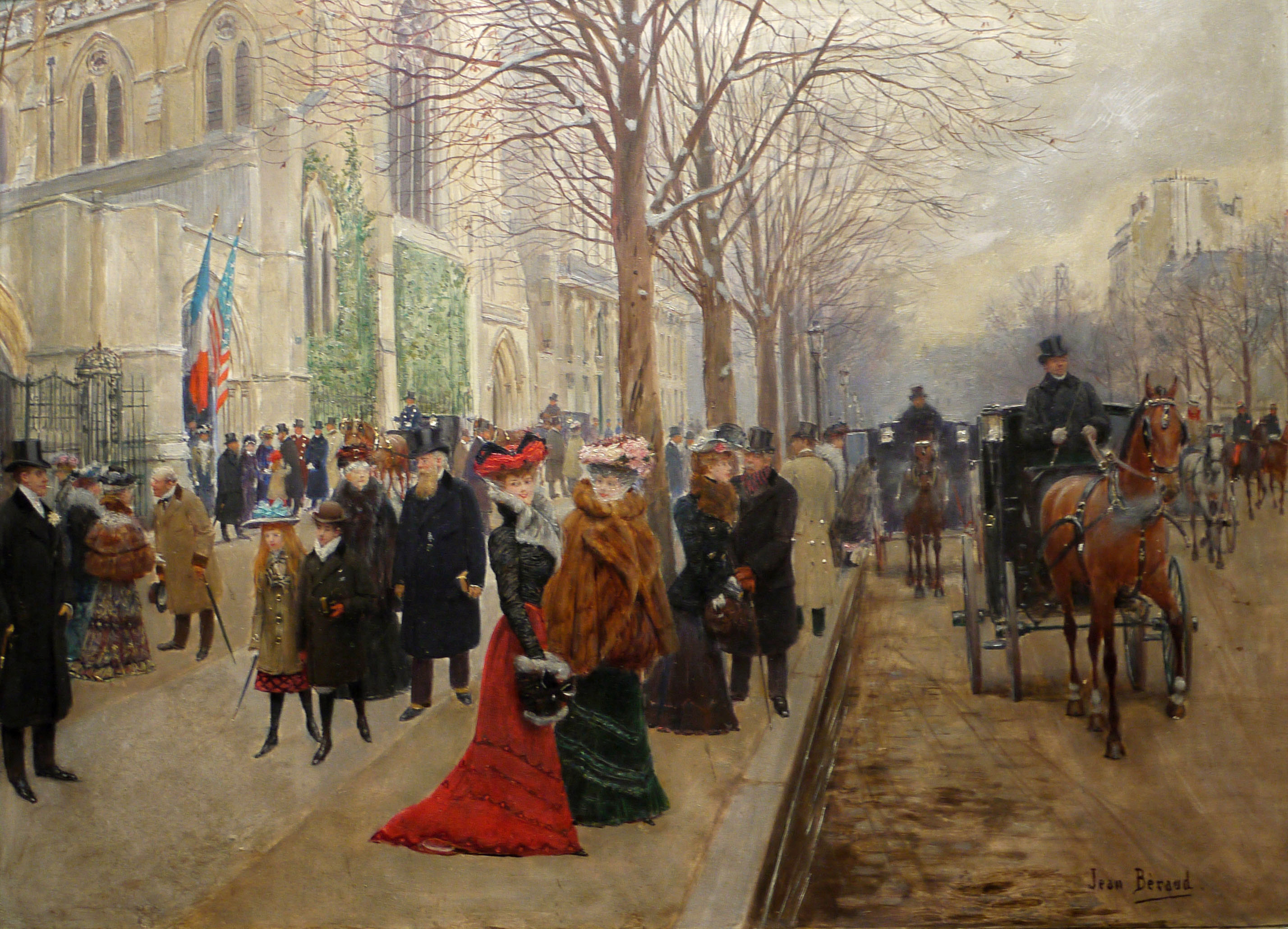
l'Église de la Sainte-Trinité

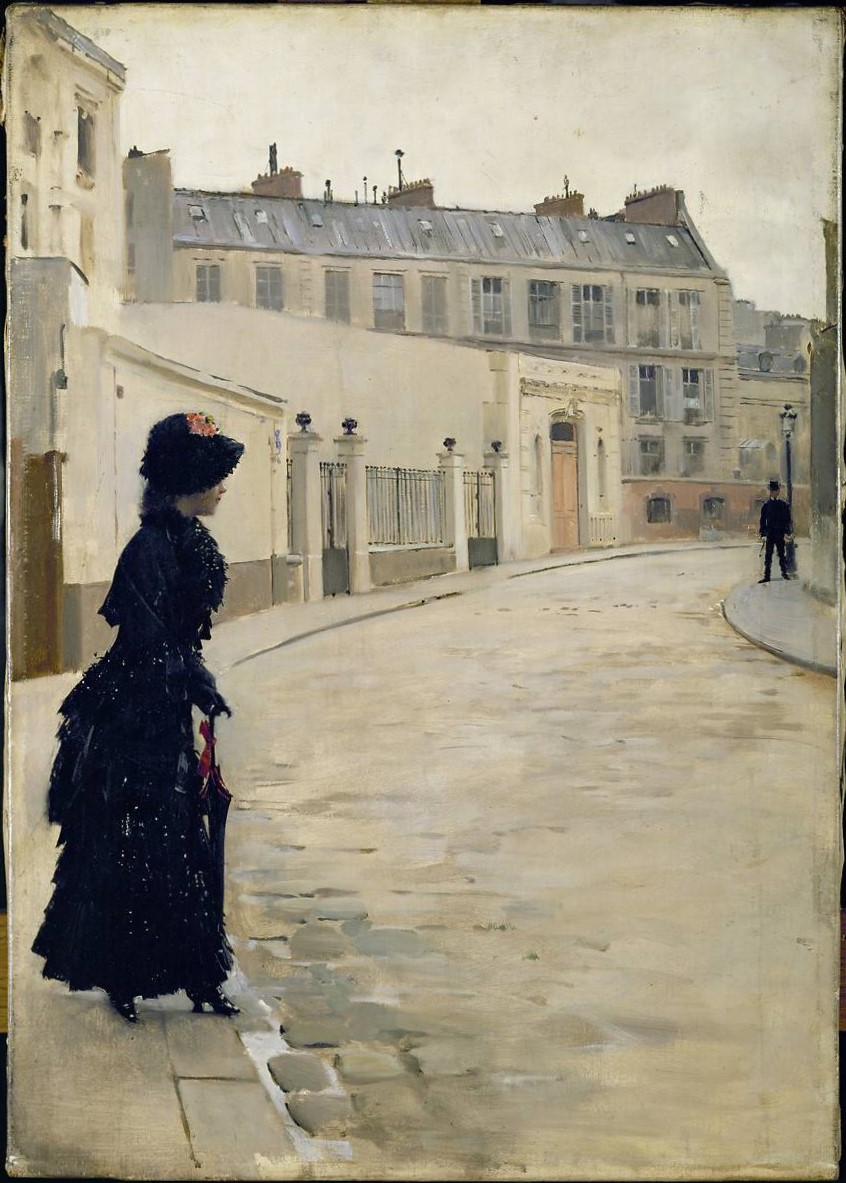
L'Attente

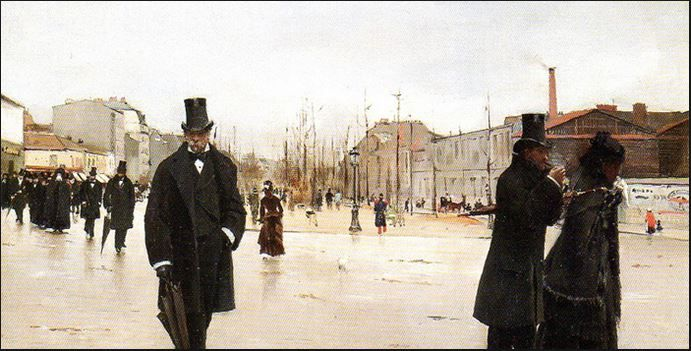
Le Retour de l'enterrement

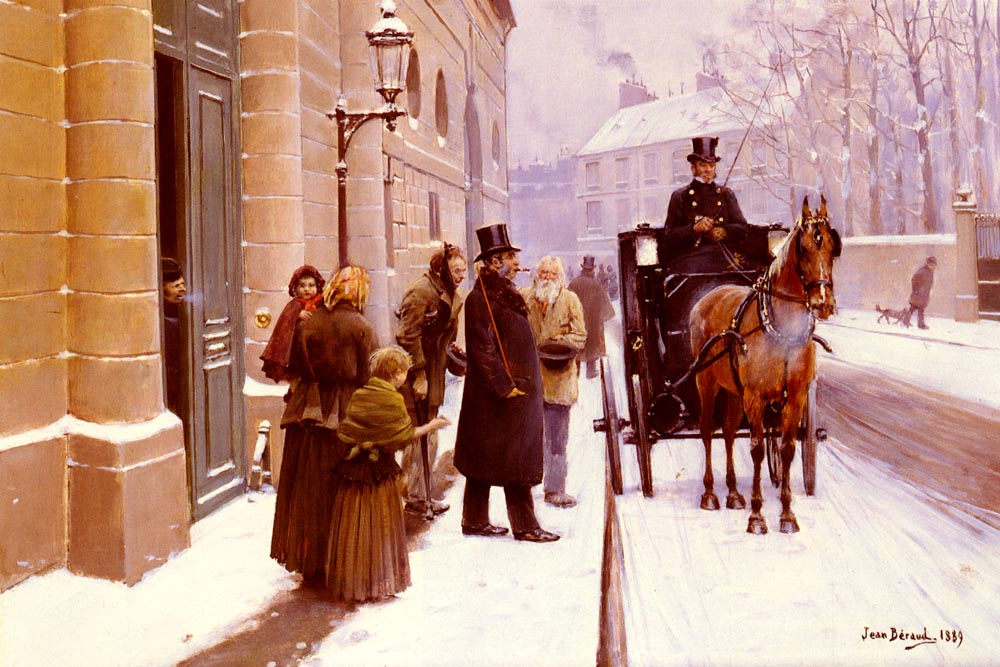
La Sortie du bourgeois

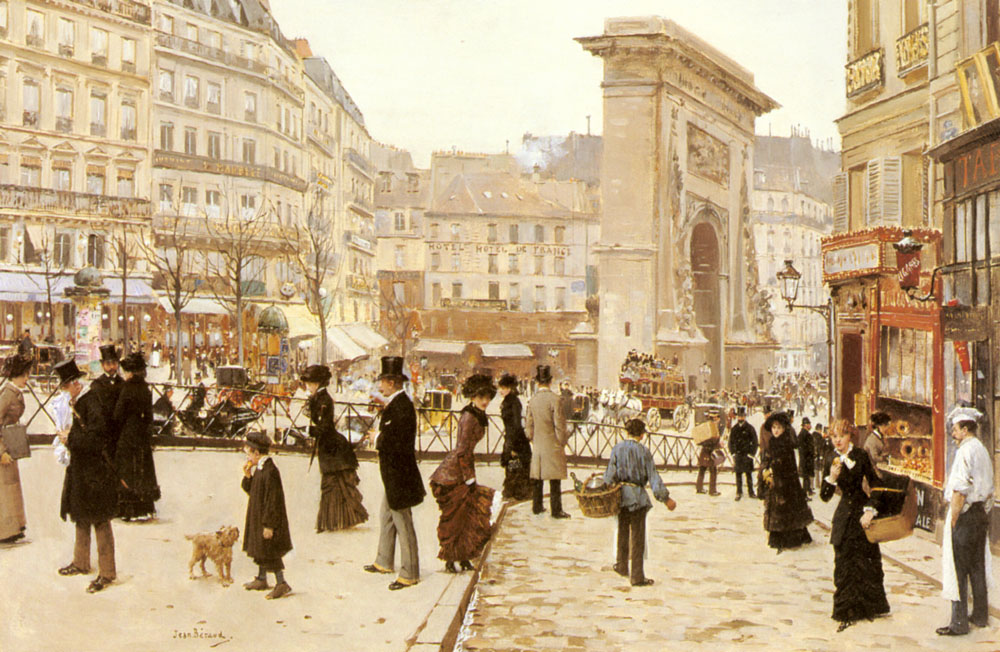
Le Boulevard Saint-Denis

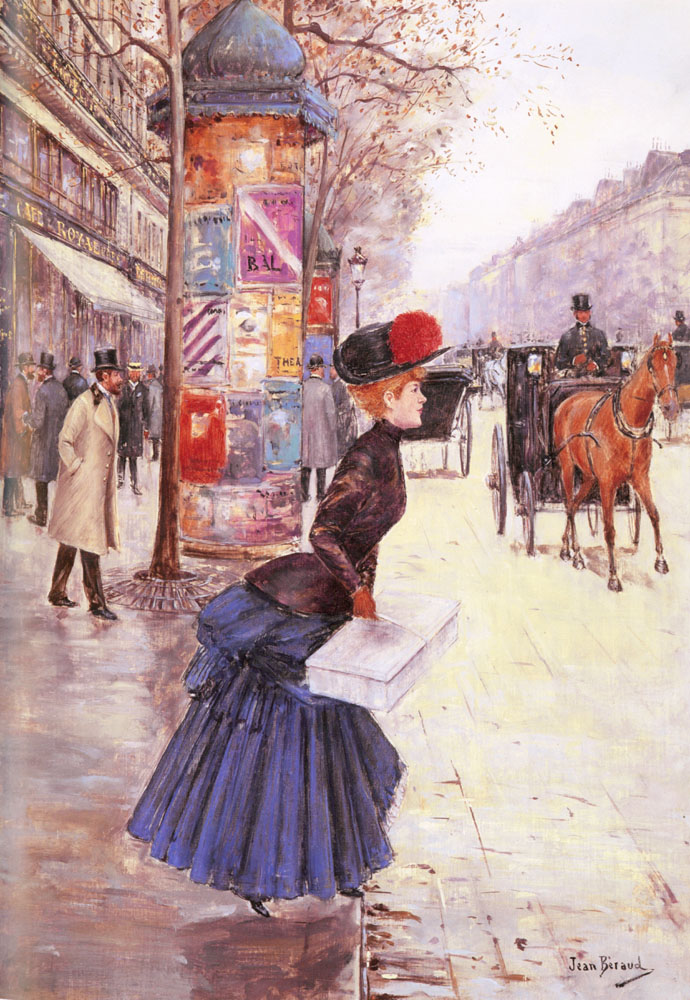
Jeune femme traversant le boulevard

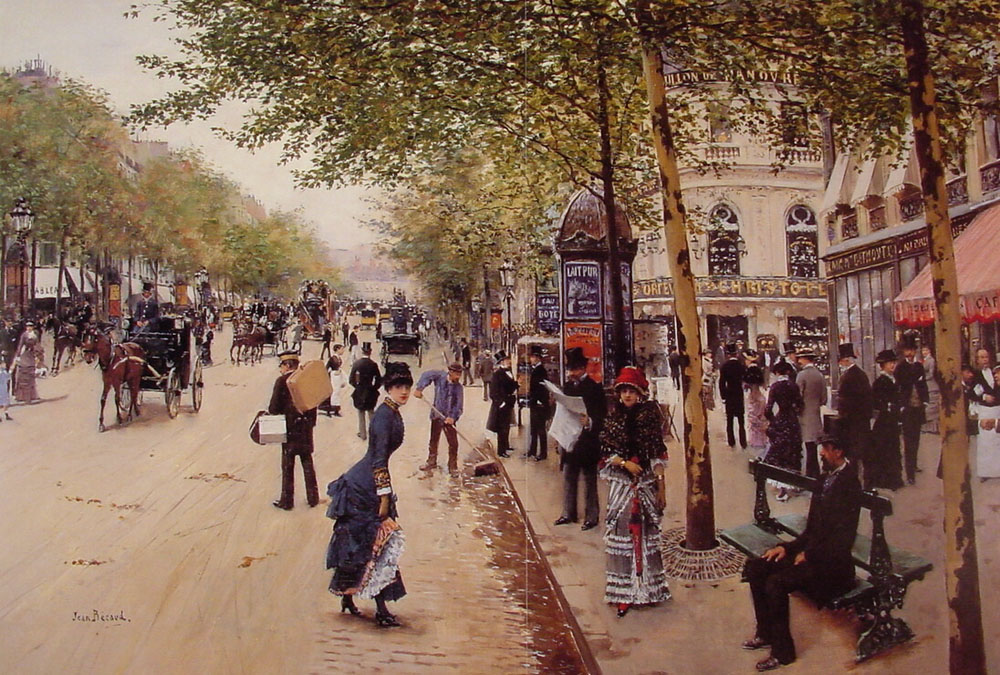
Boulevard des Capucines

Paris Kiosk 1880–1884, Walters Art Museum

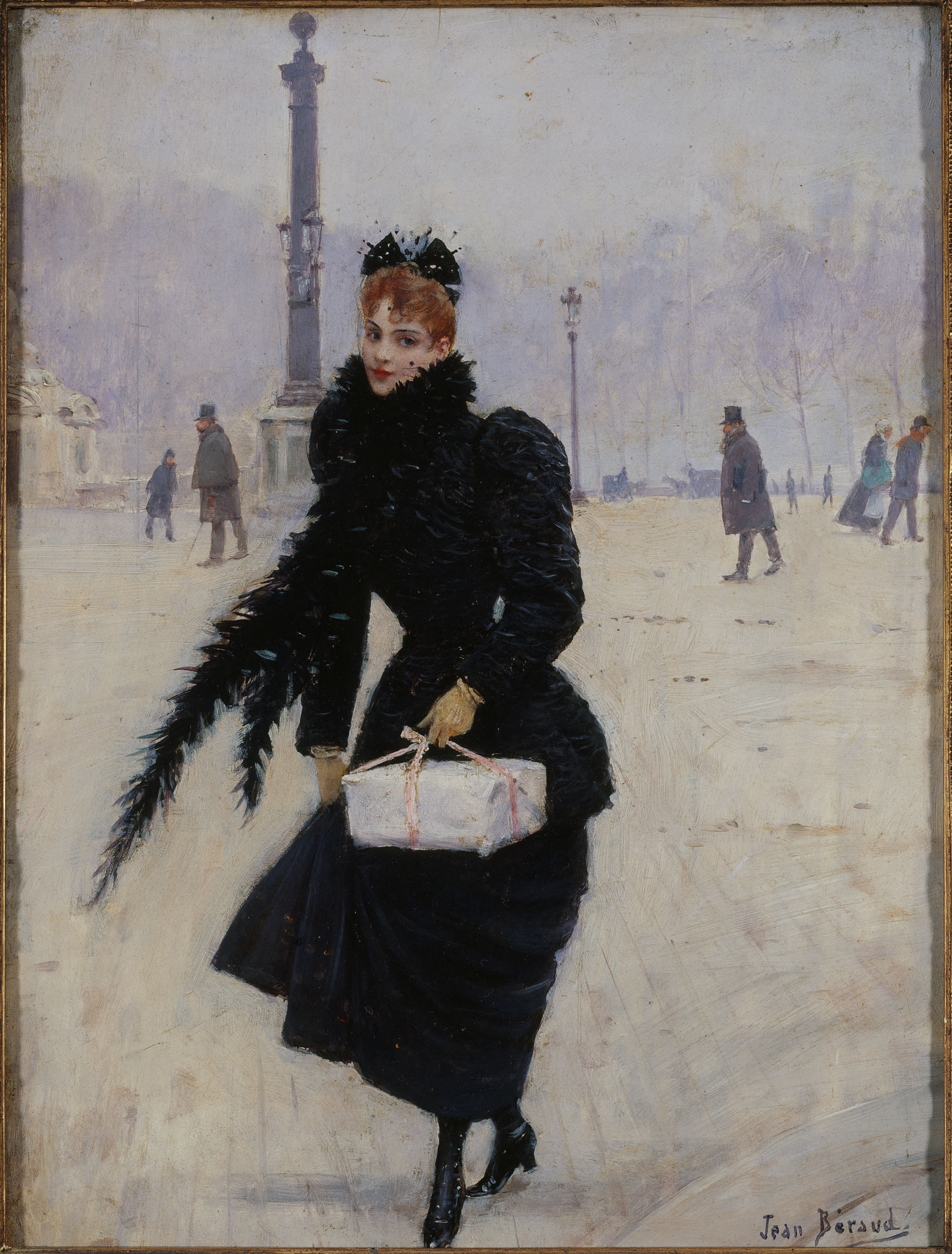
Parisienne place de la Concorde

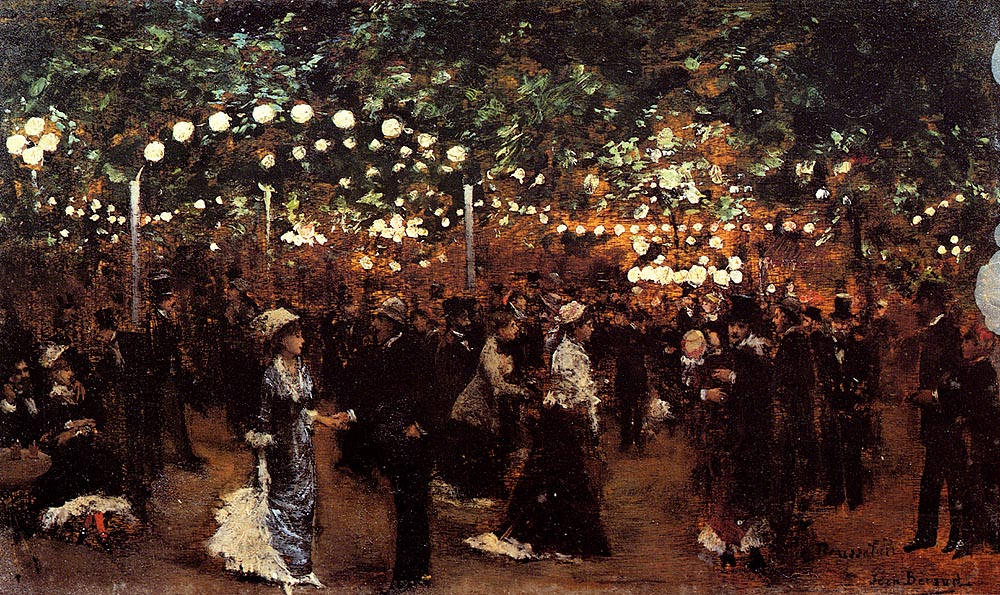
Le Bal Mabile

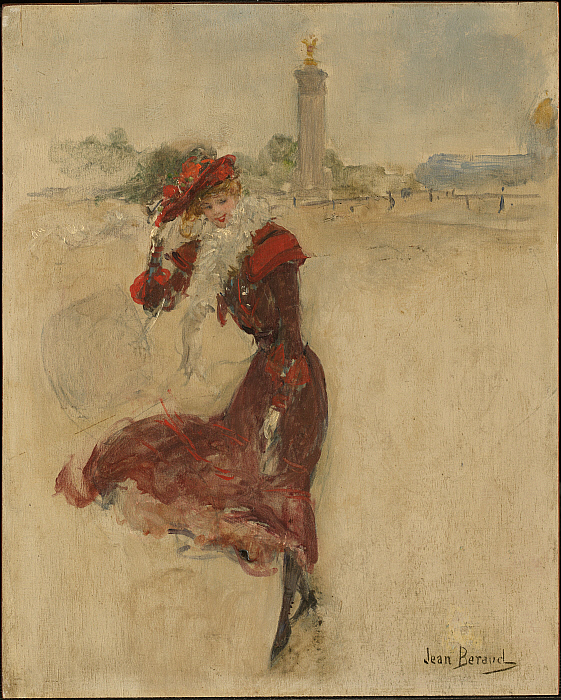
Parisienne in a Red Dress (c.1900), Oil on panel, 13 1/8 x 10 1/2 in. (33.3 x 26.7 cm), Clark Art Institute

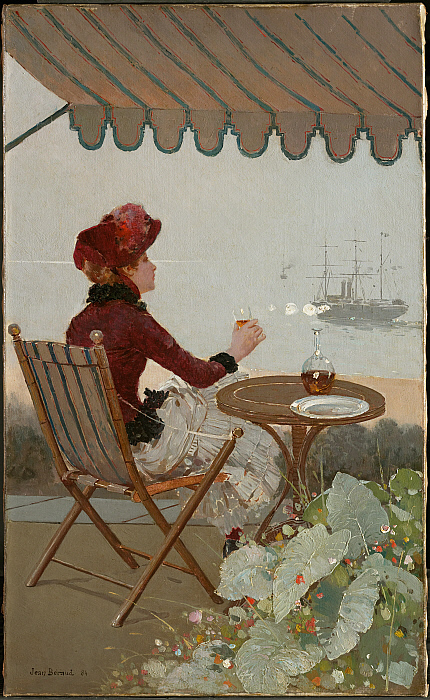
Seaside Café (1884), Oil on canvas, 21 5/8 x 13 1/8 in. (54.9 x 33.3 cm) Clark Art Institute

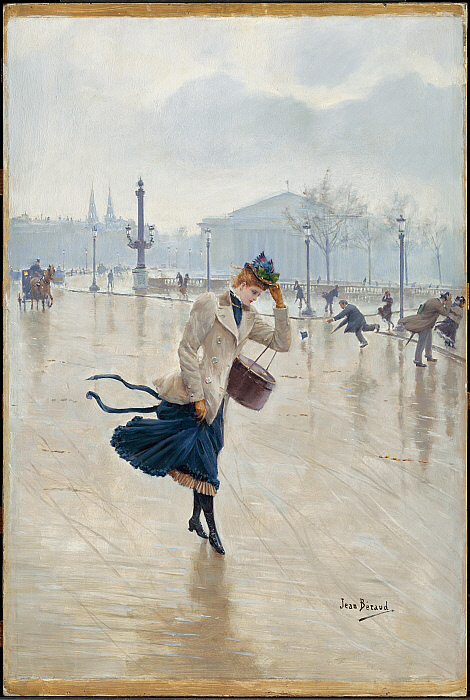
Windy Day, Place de la Concorde (c. 1890), Oil on panel, 22 1/16 x 14 13/16 in. (56 x 37.6 cm), Clark Art Institute

== Sources ==
- Patrick Offenstadt, The Belle Epoque : A Dream of Times Gone by Jean Béraud, Taschen - Wildenstein Institute, Paris, 1999.
- Tate Collection | Jean Béraud at www.tate.org.uk
- artnet.com
