= Natural product =

Chemical compound or substance produced by a living organism, found in nature

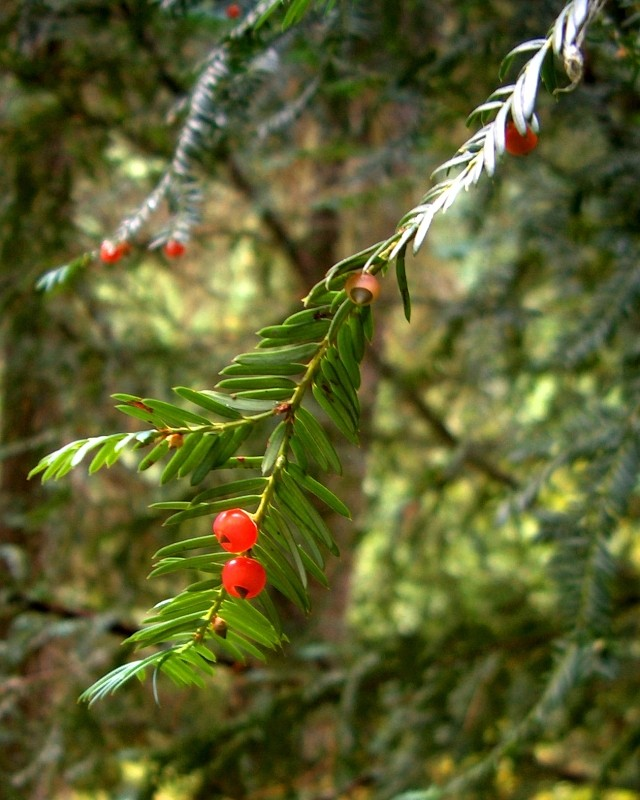
The anticancer drug paclitaxel is a natural product derived from the western yew tree.

A natural product is a natural compound or substance produced by a living organism—that is, found in nature. In the broadest sense, natural products include any substance produced by life. Natural products can also be prepared by chemical synthesis (both semisynthesis and total synthesis and have played a central role in the development of the field of organic chemistry by providing challenging synthetic targets). The term natural product has also been extended for commercial purposes to refer to cosmetics, dietary supplements, and foods produced from natural sources without added artificial ingredients.

Within the field of organic chemistry, the definition of natural products is usually restricted to organic compounds isolated from natural sources that are produced by the pathways of primary or secondary metabolism. Within the field of medicinal chemistry, the definition is often further restricted to secondary metabolites. Secondary metabolites (or specialized metabolites) are not essential for survival, but nevertheless provide organisms that produce them an evolutionary advantage. Many secondary metabolites are cytotoxic and have been selected and optimized through evolution for use as "chemical warfare" agents against prey, predators, and competing organisms. Secondary or specialized metabolites are often unique to specific species, whereas primary metabolites are commonly found across multiple kingdoms. Secondary metabolites are marked by chemical complexity which is why they are of such interest to chemists.

Traditional medicines sometime have benefit for treating diseases. Isolation of the active ingredient from these medicines can provide lead compounds in drug discovery for commercial development. Although natural products have inspired numerous drugs, drug development from natural sources has received declining attention in the 21st century by pharmaceutical companies, partly due to unreliable access and supply, intellectual property, cost, and profit concerns, seasonal or environmental variability of composition, and loss of sources due to rising extinction rates. Despite this, natural products and their derivatives still accounted for about 10% of new drug approvals between 2017 and 2019.

== Classes ==
The broadest definition of natural product is anything that is produced by life, and includes the likes of biotic materials (e.g. wood, silk), bio-based materials (e.g. bioplastics, cornstarch), bodily fluids (e.g. milk, plant exudates), and other natural materials (e.g. soil, coal).

Natural products may be classified according to their biological function, biosynthetic pathway, or source. Depending on the sources, the number of known natural product molecules ranges between 300,000 and 400,000.

== Function ==
Following Albrecht Kossel's original proposal in 1891, natural products are often divided into two major classes, the primary and secondary metabolites. Primary metabolites have an intrinsic function that is essential to the survival of the organism that produces them. Secondary metabolites in contrast have an extrinsic function that mainly affects other organisms. Secondary metabolites are not essential to survival but do increase the competitiveness of the organism within its environment. For instance, alkaloids like morphine and nicotine act as defense chemicals against herbivores, while flavonoids attract pollinators, and terpenes such as menthol serve to repel insects. Because of their ability to modulate biochemical and signal transduction pathways, some secondary metabolites have useful medicinal properties.

Natural products especially within the field of organic chemistry are often defined as primary and secondary metabolites. A more restrictive definition limiting natural products to secondary metabolites is commonly used within the fields of medicinal chemistry and pharmacognosy.

=== Primary metabolites ===
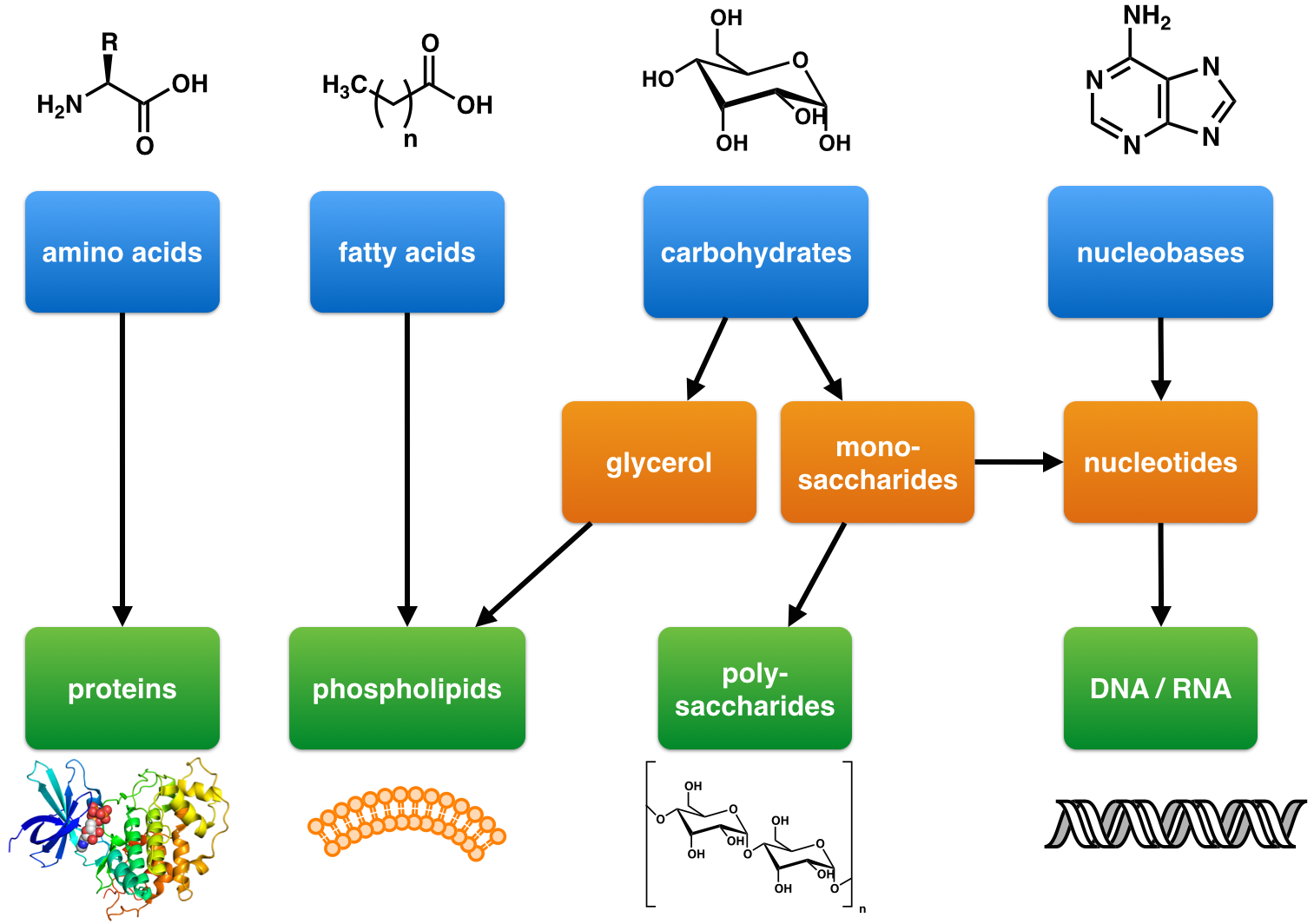
Molecular building blocks of life

Structures of representative primary metabolite vitamins

Primary metabolites, as defined by Kossel, are essential components of basic metabolic pathways required for life. They are associated with fundamental cellular functions such as nutrient assimilation, energy production, and growth and development. These metabolites have a wide distribution across many phyla and often span more than one kingdom. Primary metabolites include the basic building blocks of life: carbohydrates, lipids, amino acids, and nucleic acids.

Primary metabolites involved in energy production include enzymes essential for respiratory and photosynthetic processes. These enzymes are composed of amino acids and often require non-peptidic cofactors for proper function. The basic structures of cells and organisms are also built from primary metabolites, including components such as cell membranes (e.g., phospholipids), cell walls (e.g., peptidoglycan, chitin), and cytoskeletons (proteins).

Enzymatic cofactors that are primary metabolites include several members of the vitamin B family. For instance, vitamin B_{1} (thiamine diphosphate), synthesized from 1-deoxy-D-xylulose 5-phosphate, serves as a coenzyme for enzymes such as pyruvate dehydrogenase, 2-oxoglutarate dehydrogenase, and transketolase—all involved in carbohydrate metabolism. Vitamin B_{2} (riboflavin), derived from ribulose 5-phosphate and guanosine triphosphate, is a precursor to FMN and FAD, which are crucial for various redox reactions. Vitamin B_{3} (nicotinic acid or niacin), synthesized from tryptophan, is an essential part of the coenzymes NAD^{+} and NADP^{+}, necessary for electron transport in the Krebs cycle, oxidative phosphorylation, and other redox processes. Vitamin B_{5} (pantothenic acid), derived from α,β-dihydroxyisovalerate (a precursor to valine) and aspartic acid, is a component of coenzyme A, which plays a vital role in carbohydrate and amino acid metabolism, as well as fatty acid biosynthesis. Vitamin B_{6} (pyridoxol, pyridoxal, and pyridoxamine, originating from erythrose 4-phosphate), functions as pyridoxal 5′-phosphate and acts as a cofactor for enzymes, particularly transaminases, involved in amino acid metabolism. Vitamin B_{12} (cobalamins) contains a corrin ring structure, similar to porphyrin, and serves as a coenzyme in fatty acid catabolism and methionine synthesis.

Other primary metabolite vitamins include retinol (vitamin A), synthesized in animals from plant-derived carotenoids via the mevalonate pathway, and ascorbic acid (vitamin C), which is synthesized from glucose in the liver of animals, though not in humans.

DNA and RNA, which store and transmit genetic information, are synthesized from primary metabolites, specifically nucleic acids and carbohydrates.

First messengers are signaling molecules that regulate metabolism and cellular differentiation. These include hormones and growth factors composed of peptides, biogenic amines, steroid hormones, auxins, and gibberellins. These first messengers interact with cellular receptors, which are protein-based, and trigger the activation of second messengers to relay the extracellular signal to intracellular targets. Second messengers often include primary metabolites such as cyclic nucleotides and diacyl glycerol.

=== Secondary metabolites ===
Representative examples of each of the major classes of secondary metabolites

Secondary in contrast to primary metabolites are dispensable and not absolutely required for survival. Furthermore, secondary metabolites typically have a narrow species distribution.

Secondary metabolites have a broad range of functions. These include pheromones that act as social signaling molecules with other individuals of the same species, communication molecules that attract and activate symbiotic organisms, agents that solubilize and transport nutrients (siderophores etc.), and competitive weapons (repellants, venoms, toxins etc.) that are used against competitors, prey, and predators. For many other secondary metabolites, the function is unknown. One hypothesis is that they confer a competitive advantage to the organism that produces them. An alternative view is that, in analogy to the immune system, these secondary metabolites have no specific function, but having the machinery in place to produce these diverse chemical structures is important and a few secondary metabolites are therefore produced and selected for.

General structural classes of secondary metabolites include alkaloids, phenylpropanoids, polyketides, and terpenoids.

== Biosynthesis ==
Basic building blocks for secondary metabolites derived from primary metabolism

The biosynthetic pathways leading to the major classes of natural products are described below.

=== Carbohydrates ===
Carbohydrates are organic molecules essential for energy storage, structural support, and various biological processes in living organisms. They are produced through photosynthesis in plants or gluconeogenesis in animals and can be converted into larger polysaccharides:

- Photosynthesis or gluconeogenesis → monosaccharides → polysaccharides (cellulose, chitin, glycogen, etc.)

Carbohydrates serve as a primary energy source for most life forms. Additionally, polysaccharides derived from simpler sugars are vital structural components, forming the cell walls of bacteria and plants.

During photosynthesis, plants initially produce 3-phosphoglyceraldehyde, a three-carbon triose. This can be converted into glucose (a six-carbon sugar) or various pentoses (five-carbon sugars) through the Calvin cycle. In animals, three-carbon precursors like lactate or glycerol are converted into pyruvate, which can then be synthesized into carbohydrates in the liver.

=== Fatty acids and polyketides ===
Fatty acid biosynthesis cycle. ACP: acyl carrier protein Enzyme abbreviations: ACC: acetyl-CoA carboxylase; ACS: acyl-CoA synthase; AT: acyltransferase; ER: enoyl reductase; HD: hydroxyacyl dehydratase; KR: ketoacyl reductase; KS: ketoacyl synthase; TE: thioesterase.

Fatty acids and polyketides are synthesized via the acetate pathway, which starts from basic building blocks derived from sugars:

- Sugars → acetate pathway → fatty acids and polyketides

During glycolysis, sugars are broken down into acetyl-CoA. In an ATP-dependent enzymatic reaction, acetyl-CoA is carboxylated to form malonyl-CoA. Acetyl-CoA and malonyl-CoA then undergo a Claisen condensation, releasing carbon dioxide to form acetoacetyl-CoA which is used by the mevalonate pathway to produce steroids. In fatty acid synthesis, one molecule of acetyl-CoA (the "starter unit") and several molecules of malonyl-CoA (the "extender units") are condensed by fatty acid synthase. After each round of elongation, the keto group is reduced, the intermediate alcohol dehydrated, and resulting enoyl-CoAs are reduced to acyl-CoAs. Fatty acids are essential components of lipid bilayers that form cell membranes and serve as energy storage in the form of fat in animals.

The plant-derived fatty acid linoleic acid is converted in animals through elongation and desaturation into arachidonic acid, which is then transformed into various eicosanoids, including leukotrienes, prostaglandins, and thromboxanes. These eicosanoids act as signaling molecules, playing key roles in inflammation and immune responses.

Alternatively the intermediates from additional condensation reactions are left unreduced to generate poly-β-keto chains, which are subsequently converted into various polyketides. The polyketide class of natural products has diverse structures and functions and includes important compounds such as macrolide antibiotics.

=== Aromatic amino acids and phenylpropanoids ===
Shikimate pathway produces aromatic amino acids (AAAs) and phenylpropanoids:

- Shikimate pathway → aromatic amino acids and phenylpropanoids

Phenylalanine, tyrosine, and tryptophan are synthesized from phosphoenolpyruvate and erythrose-4-phosphate via chorismate.

In plants, phenylalanine and tyrosine are synthesized via arogenate.

Phenylalanine initiates the phenylpropanoid pathway, yielding diverse secondary metabolites.

AAA derivatives function as pigments, hormones, cell wall components, and in plant defense. This pathway is absent in animals and is inhibited by glyphosate herbicides.

=== Terpenoids and steroids ===
Terpenoid and steroid biosynthesis pathways within the eukaryotes.

The Mevalonate (MVA) and methylerythritol phosphate (MEP) pathways produce terpenoids and steroids:

- Mevalonate pathway and methylerythritol phosphate pathway → terpenoids and steroids

Both pathways generate isopentenyl diphosphate (IPP) and dimethylallyl diphosphate (DMAPP) which are used as universal terpenoid precursors.

The MVA pathway produces steroids. statins (which are themselves synthesized via the acetate pathway) inhibit its key enzyme, HMG-CoA reductase, and have found application in the treatment of hypercholesterolemia.

The MEP pathway produces plastid terpenoids including carotenoids and chlorophylls.

IPP and DMAPP form geranyl, farnesyl, and geranylgeranyl diphosphates, precursors of monoterpenes, sesquiterpenes, and triterpenes. Cyclization, oxidation, and glycosylation reactions generate diversity of terpenoid structures.

Steroids arise via farnesyl diphosphate, squalene, and lanosterol en route to cholesterol and related steroids.

=== Alkaloids ===
Biosynthesis of the alkaloid cocaine depicting four key steps (labeled 1–4)

Alkaloids are nitrogen-containing natural products produced in plants primarily from amino acids although there are well known exceptions including purine alkaloids synthesized from purine nucleotides and some terpenoid containing alkaloids with mixed terpenoid and nitrogen origins.

Biosynthesis of alkaloids often proceeds via amine and aldehyde precursors, iminium cation formation, and a Mannich-like reaction. Common precursors include tryptophan, tyrosine, lysine, arginine, and ornithine. As an example, cocaine biosynthesis follows this general pathway.

The Pictet–Spengler reaction is frequently used to synthesize alkaloid scaffolds in both labrotories and in nature, the akaloid strictosidine is a good example.

Oxidoreductases, including cytochrome P450s and monooxygenases, diversify alkaloid structures through redox reactions. Examples include isoquinoline containing alkaloids arising from (S)-reticuline (itself made from tyrosine).

=== Peptides, proteins, and other amino acid derivatives ===
Biosynthetic routes also produce peptides, proteins, and amino acid-derived natural products with diverse biological functions.

Protein synthesis in turn assembles amino acids using transcription of DNA into messenger RNA which in turn acts as a template which ribosomes use to link transfer RNAs into a growing polypeptide chain.

Peptide hormones such as oxytocin and vasopressin regulate physiology and metabolism in organisms. Modified peptides, including for example penicillins and cephalosporins, undergo extensive enzymatic transformations.

Cyanogenic glycosides are amino acid-derived compounds that release hydrogen cyanide and are important components in plant and arthropod defense. Glucosinolates among other products are amino acid-derived sulfur compounds that yield pungent isothiocyanates upon tissue damage.

== Sources ==
Natural products may be extracted from the cells, tissues, and secretions of microorganisms, plants and animals. A crude (unfractionated) extract from any one of these sources will contain a range of structurally diverse and often novel chemical compounds. Chemical diversity in nature is based on biological diversity, so researchers collect samples from around the world to analyze and evaluate in drug discovery screens or bioassays. This effort to search for biologically active natural products is known as bioprospecting.

Pharmacognosy provides the tools to detect, isolate and identify bioactive natural products that could be developed for medicinal use. When an "active principle" is isolated from a traditional medicine or other biological material, this is known as a "hit". Subsequent scientific and legal work is then performed to validate the hit (e.g. elucidation of mechanism of action, confirmation that there is no intellectual property conflict). This is followed by the hit to lead stage of drug discovery, where derivatives of the active compound are produced in an attempt to improve its potency and safety. In this and related ways, modern medicines can be developed directly from natural sources.

Although traditional medicines and other biological material are considered an excellent source of novel compounds, the extraction and isolation of these compounds can be a slow, expensive and inefficient process. For large scale manufacture therefore, attempts may be made to produce the new compound by total synthesis or semisynthesis. Because natural products are generally secondary metabolites with complex chemical structures, their total/semisynthesis is not always commercially viable. In these cases, efforts can be made to design simpler analogues with comparable potency and safety that are amenable to total/semisynthesis.

=== Prokaryotic ===
==== Bacteria ====
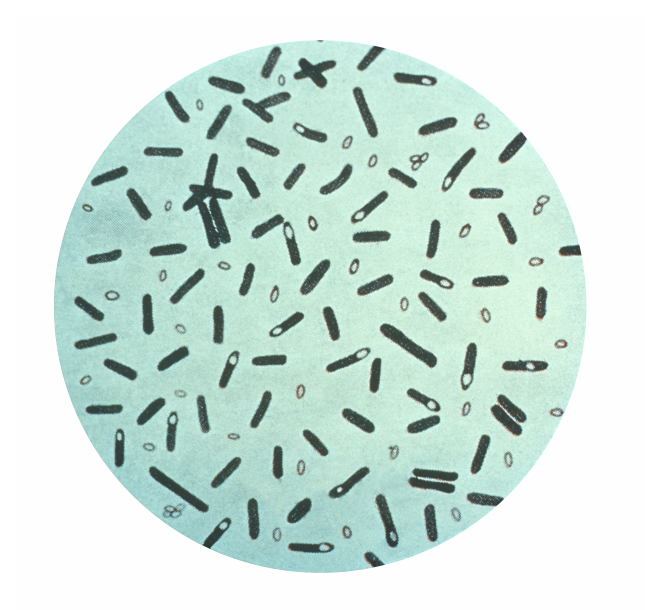
Botulinum toxin types A and B (Botox, Dysport, Xeomin, MyoBloc), used both medicinally and cosmetically, are natural products from the bacterium Clostridium botulinum.

The serendipitous discovery and subsequent clinical success of penicillin prompted a large-scale search for other environmental microorganisms that might produce anti-infective natural products. Soil and water samples were collected from all over the world, leading to the discovery of streptomycin (derived from Streptomyces griseus), and the realization that soil bacteria, not just saprobic fungi, represent an important source of pharmacologically active natural products. This, in turn, led to the development of an impressive arsenal of antibacterial and antifungal agents including amphotericin B, chloramphenicol, daptomycin and tetracycline (from Streptomyces spp.), the polymyxins (from Paenibacillus polymyxa), and the rifamycins (from Amycolatopsis rifamycinica). Antiparasitic (e.g moxidectin) and antiviral drugs have similarly been derived from bacterial metabolites.

Although most of the drugs derived from bacteria are employed as anti-infectives, some have found use in other fields of medicine. Botulinum toxin (from Clostridium botulinum) and bleomycin (from Streptomyces verticillus) are two examples. Botulinum, the neurotoxin responsible for botulism, can be injected into specific muscles (such as those controlling the eyelid) to prevent muscle spasm. Also, the glycopeptide bleomycin is used for the treatment of several cancers including Hodgkin's lymphoma, head and neck cancer, and testicular cancer. Newer trends in the field include the metabolic profiling and isolation of natural products from novel bacterial species present in underexplored environments. Examples include symbionts or endophytes from tropical environments, subterranean bacteria found deep underground via mining/drilling, and marine bacteria.

==== Archaea ====
Because many Archaea have adapted to life in extreme environments such as polar regions, hot springs, acidic springs, alkaline springs, salt lakes, and the high pressure of deep ocean water, they possess enzymes that are functional under quite unusual conditions. These enzymes are of potential use in the food, chemical, and pharmaceutical industries, where biotechnological processes frequently involve high temperatures, extremes of pH, high salt concentrations, and / or high pressure. Examples of enzymes identified to date include amylases, pullulanases, cyclodextrin glycosyltransferases, cellulases, xylanases, chitinases, proteases, alcohol dehydrogenase, and esterases. Archaea represent a source of novel chemical compounds also, as unusual polyethers such as caldarchaeol from organisms such as Methanocaldococcus jannaschii, have been described.

=== Eukaryotic ===
==== Fungi ====
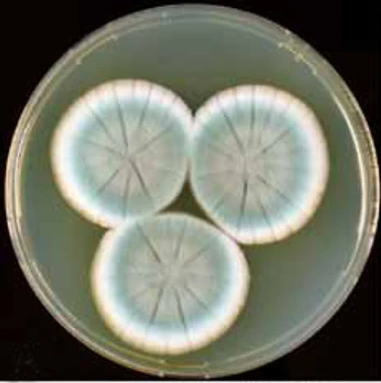
The antibiotic penicillin is a natural product derived from the fungus Penicillium rubens.

Several anti-infective medications have been derived from fungi including penicillin and the cephalosporins (antibacterial drugs from Penicillium rubens and Cephalosporium acremonium, respectively) and griseofulvin (an antifungal drug from Penicillium griseofulvum). Other medicinally useful fungal metabolites include lovastatin (from Aspergillus terreus and Pleurotus ostreatus), which became a lead for a series of drugs that lower cholesterol levels, cyclosporin (from Tolypocladium), which is used to suppress the immune response after organ transplant operations, and ergometrine (from Claviceps spp.), which acts as a strong vasoconstrictor, and is used to prevent bleeding after childbirth. Asperlicin (from Aspergillus alliaceus) is another example. Asperlicin is a novel antagonist of cholecystokinin, a neurotransmitter thought to be involved in panic attacks, and could potentially be used to treat anxiety.

Psilocybin is an indole alkaloid isolated from various members of the Agaricomycetes; it served as the lead for a series of drugs called the psychoplastogens, which have shown promise in treating brain injury.

==== Plants ====
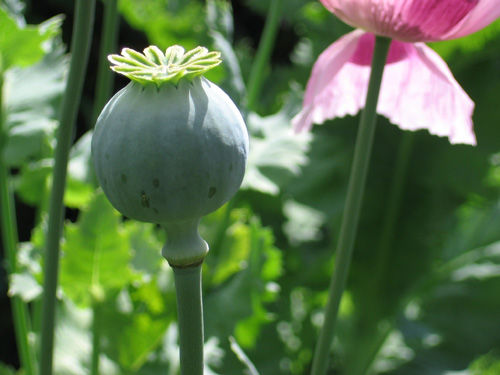
The analgesic and recreational drug morphine is a natural product derived from the plant Papaver somniferum

Plants are a major source of complex and highly structurally diverse chemical compounds (phytochemicals), this structural diversity attributed in part to the natural selection of organisms producing potent compounds to deter herbivory (feeding deterrents). Major classes of phytochemical include phenols, polyphenols, tannins, terpenes, and alkaloids. Though the number of plants that have been extensively studied is relatively small, many pharmacologically active natural products have already been identified. Clinically useful examples include the anticancer agents paclitaxel and omacetaxine mepesuccinate (from Taxus brevifolia and Cephalotaxus harringtonii, respectively), the antimalarial agent artemisinin (from Artemisia annua), and the acetylcholinesterase inhibitor galantamine (from Galanthus spp.), used to treat Alzheimer's disease. Other plant-derived drugs, used medicinally and/or recreationally include morphine, cocaine, quinine, tubocurarine, cannabinol, and nicotine.

==== Animals ====
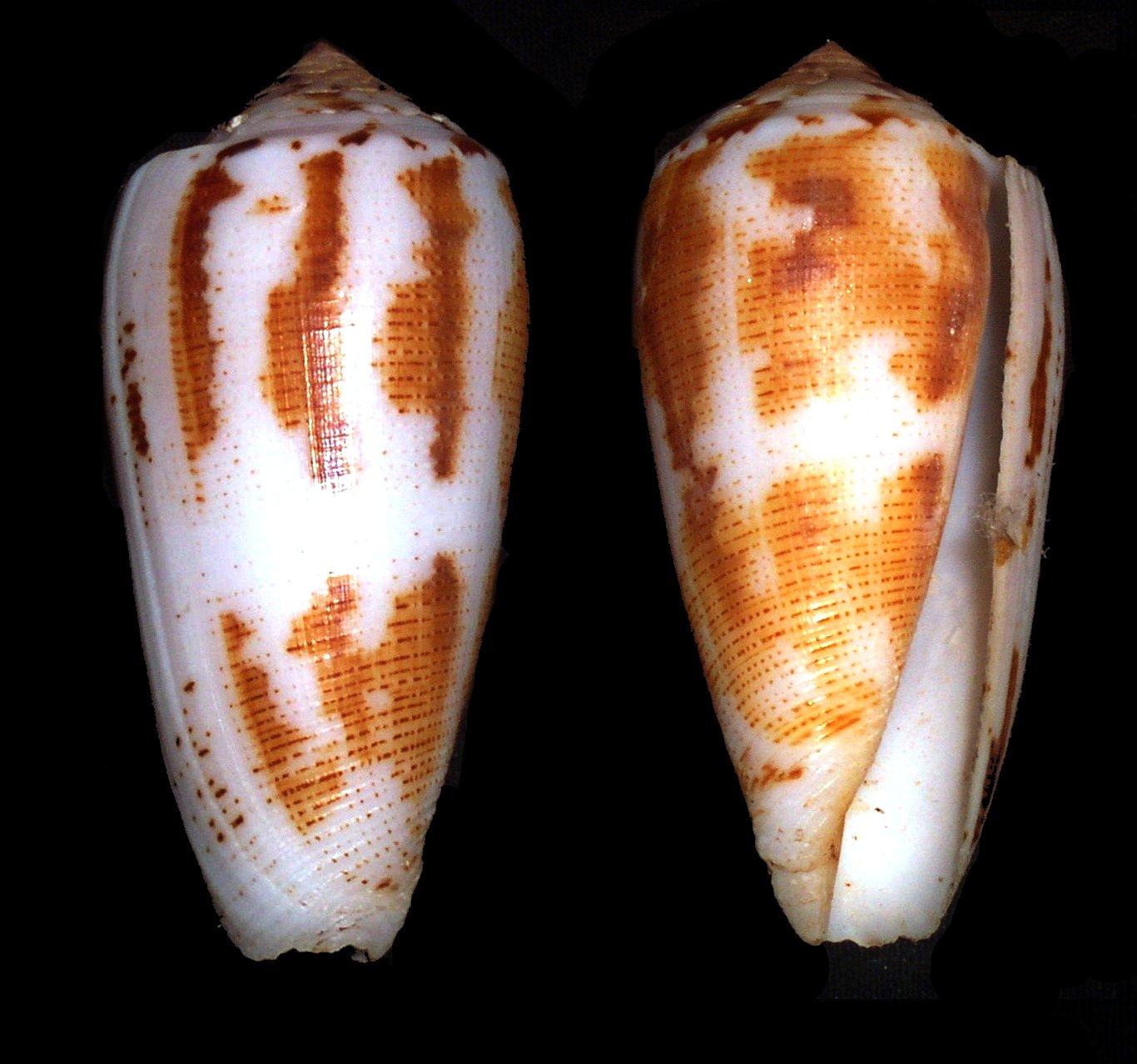
The analgesic drug ω-conotoxin (ziconotide) is a natural product derived from the sea snail Conus magus.

Animals also represent a source of bioactive natural products. In particular, venomous animals such as snakes, spiders, scorpions, caterpillars, bees, wasps, centipedes, ants, toads, and frogs have attracted much attention. This is because venom constituents (peptides, enzymes, nucleotides, lipids, biogenic amines etc.) often have very specific interactions with a macromolecular target in the body (e.g. α-bungarotoxin from cobras). As with plant feeding deterrents, this biological activity is attributed to natural selection, organisms capable of killing or paralyzing their prey and/or defending themselves against predators being more likely to survive and reproduce.

Because of these specific chemical-target interactions, venom constituents have proved important tools for studying receptors, ion channels, and enzymes. In some cases, they have also served as leads in the development of novel drugs. For example, teprotide, a peptide isolated from the venom of the Brazilian pit viper Bothrops jararaca, was a lead in the development of the antihypertensive agents cilazapril and captopril. Also, echistatin, a disintegrin from the venom of the saw-scaled viper Echis carinatus was a lead in the development of the antiplatelet drug tirofiban.

In addition to the terrestrial animals and amphibians described above, many marine animals have been examined for pharmacologically active natural products, with corals, sponges, tunicates, sea snails, and bryozoans yielding chemicals with interesting analgesic, antiviral, and anticancer activities. Two examples developed for clinical use include ω-conotoxin (from the marine snail Conus magus) and ecteinascidin 743 (from the tunicate Ecteinascidia turbinata). The former, ω-conotoxin, is used to relieve severe and chronic pain, while the latter, ecteinascidin 743 is used to treat metastatic soft tissue sarcoma. Other natural products derived from marine animals and under investigation as possible therapies include the antitumour agents discodermolide (from the sponge Discodermia dissoluta), eleutherobin (from the soft coral Erythropodium caribaeorum), and the bryostatins (from the bryozoan Bugula neritina).

== Medical uses ==
Natural products sometimes have pharmacological activity that can be of therapeutic benefit in treating diseases. Moreover, synthetic analogs of natural products with improved potency and safety can be prepared, and therefore, natural products are often used as starting points for drug discovery. Natural product constituents have inspired numerous drug discovery efforts that eventually gained approval as new drugs.

Representative examples of drugs based on natural products

=== Modern natural product-derived drugs ===
Many prescribed drugs have been either directly derived from or inspired by natural products. Approximately 35% of the annual global market of medicine is either from natural products or related drugs. This breaks down as 25% from plants, 13% from microorganisms, and 3% from animal sources.

Between 1981 and 2019, the FDA approved 1,881 new chemical entities, of which 65 (3.5%) were unaltered natural products, 99 (5.3%) were defined mixture botanical drugs, 178 (9.5%) were natural product derivatives, and 164 (8.7%) were synthetic compounds containing natural product pharmacophores. Altogether, this accounts for 506 (26.9%) of all new approved drugs. Additionally, natural products and their derivatives often show higher success rates in later clinical trial phases and may have lower toxicity profiles compared to synthetic compounds.

Some of the oldest natural product based drugs are analgesics. The bark of the willow tree has been known since antiquity to have pain-relieving properties due to the natural product salicin, which in turn may be hydrolyzed into salicylic acid. A synthetic derivative acetylsalicylic acid better known as aspirin is a widely used pain reliever. Its mechanism of action is inhibition of the cyclooxygenase (COX) enzyme. Another notable example is opium. The most potent narcotic component of opium is the alkaloid morphine, which acts as an opioid receptor agonist. The N-type calcium channel blocker ziconotide is an analgesic based on a cyclic peptide cone snail toxin (ω-conotoxin MVIIA) from the species Conus magus.

Numerous anti-infectives are based on natural products. The first antibiotic to be discovered, penicillin, was isolated from the mold Penicillium. Penicillin and related beta lactams work by inhibiting the DD-transpeptidase enzyme that is required by bacteria to cross link peptidoglycan to form the cell wall.

Several natural product drugs target tubulin, which is a component of the cytoskeleton. These include the tubulin polymerization inhibitor colchicine isolated from the Colchicum autumnale (autumn crocus flowering plant), which is used to treat gout. Colchicine is biosynthesized from the amino acids phenylalanine and tryptophan. Paclitaxel, in contrast, is a tubulin polymerization stabilizer and is used as a chemotherapeutic drug. Paclitaxel is based on the terpenoid natural product taxol, which is isolated from Taxus brevifolia (the pacific yew tree).

A class of drugs widely used to lower cholesterol are the HMG-CoA reductase inhibitors, for example atorvastatin. These were developed from mevastatin, a polyketide produced by the fungus Penicillium citrinum. Finally, a number natural product drugs are used to treat hypertension and congestive heart failure. These include the angiotensin-converting enzyme inhibitor captopril. Captopril is based on the peptidic bradykinin potentiating factor isolated from venom of the Brazilian arrowhead viper (Bothrops jararaca).

Examples of recently approved drugs derived from natural product leads include ibrexafungerp, approved by the FDA in 2021 for the treatment of vulvovaginal candidiasis, and omaveloxolone, approved by the FDA in 2023 for the treatment of Friedreich’s ataxia. Ibrexafungerp is a semisynthetic derivative of enfumafungin, a defensive triterpenoid produced by fungi, whereas omaveloxolone is a semisynthetic derivative of the plant chemical oleanic acid.

=== Limiting and enabling factors ===
Numerous challenges limit the use of natural products for drug discovery, resulting in 21st century preference by pharmaceutical companies to dedicate discovery efforts toward high-throughput screening of pure synthetic compounds with shorter timelines to refinement. Natural product sources are often unreliable to access and supply, have a high probability of duplication, inherently create intellectual property concerns about patent protection, vary in composition due to sourcing season or environment, and are susceptible to rising extinction rates.

The biological resource for drug discovery from natural products remains abundant, with small percentages of microorganisms, plant species, and insects assessed for bioactivity. In enormous numbers, bacteria and marine microorganisms remain unexamined. As of 2008, the field of metagenomics was proposed to examine genes and their function in soil microbes, but most pharmaceutical firms have not exploited this resource fully, choosing instead to develop "diversity-oriented synthesis" from libraries of known drugs or natural sources for lead compounds with higher potential for bioactivity.

== Isolation and purification ==
Penicillin G, the first-of-its-class fungal antibiotic, first studied by Scottish microbiologist Alexander Fleming in the late 1920s, and made practical as a therapeutic via natural product isolation in the late 1930s by Ernst Boris Chain, Howard Florey, (Note: These three named scientists shared the 1945 Nobel Prize in Medicine for the work.) and others, Fleming recognized the antibacterial activity and clinical potential of "pen G", but was unable to purify or stabilize it. Developments in chromatographic separations and freeze drying helped move progress forward in the production of commercial quantities of penicillin and other natural products.

All natural products begin as mixtures with other compounds from the natural source, often very complex mixtures, from which the product of interest must be isolated and purified. The isolation of a natural product refers, depending on context, either to the isolation of sufficient quantities of pure chemical matter for chemical structure elucidation, derivitzation/degradation chemistry, biological testing, and other research needs,

Structure determination refers to methods applied to determine the chemical structure of an isolated, pure natural product. For instance, the chemical structure of penicillin was determined by Dorothy Crowfoot Hodgkin in 1945, work for which she later received a Nobel Prize in Chemistry (1964).

Modern structure determination involves a variety of advanced analytical techniques. Nuclear magnetic resonance (NMR) spectroscopy and X-ray crystallography are commonly used for structure elucidation. High-resolution tandem mass spectrometry (MS/MS) also plays a important role, providing the molecular weight of the parent ion and fragments which can be used to support the structural assignment. For complex structures, computational methods are increasingly used to assist in structure determination. These may include computer-assisted structure elucidation (CASE) tools and in silico fragmentation prediction tools. Determination of the absolute configuration often relies on a combination of NMR data (coupling constants and nuclear Overhauser effect (NOE), chemical derivatization methods (e.g., Mosher's ester analysis), and spectroscopic techniques like vibrational circular dichroism (VCD), and optical rotatory dispersion (ORD). In cases where traditional methods are insufficient, especially for novel compounds with unprecedented molecular skeletons, computational chemistry approaches are used to predict and compare spectral data, helping to elucidate the complete structure including the assignment stereochemistry.

== Synthesis ==
Many natural products have complex structures. The complexity is determined by factors like molecular mass, arrangement of substructures (e.g., functional groups, rings), number and density of these groups, their stability, stereochemical elements, and physical properties, as well as the novelty of the structure and prior synthetic efforts.

Less complex natural products can often be cost-effectively synthesized from simpler chemical ingredients through total synthesis. However, not all natural products are suitable for total synthesis. The most complex ones are often impractical to synthesize on a large scale due to high costs. In these cases, isolation from natural sources may be sufficient if it provides adequate quantities, as seen with drugs like penicillin, morphine, and paclitaxel, which were obtained at commercial scales without significant synthetic chemistry.

=== Semisynthesis ===
Isolating a natural product from its source can be costly in terms of time and materials, and may impact the availability of the natural resource or have ecological consequences. For example, it is estimated that harvesting enough paclitaxel for a single dose of therapy would require the bark of an entire yew tree (Taxus brevifolia). Additionally, the number of structural analogues available for structure–activity analysis (SAR) is limited by the biology of the organism, and thus beyond experimental control.

When the desired product is difficult to obtain or modify to create analogs, a middle-to-late stage biosynthetic precursor or analog can sometimes be used to produce the final target. This approach, called semisynthesis or partial synthesis, involves extracting a biosynthetic intermediate and converting it into the final product using conventional chemical synthesis techniques.

This strategy offers two advantages. First, the intermediate may be easier to extract and yield higher amounts than the final product. For instance, paclitaxel can be produced by extracting 10-deacetylbaccatin III from T. brevifolia needles, followed by a four-step synthesis. Second, the semisynthetic process allows for the creation of analogues of the final product, as seen in the development of newer generation semisynthetic penicillins.

=== Total synthesis ===
Structural representation of cobalamin, a natural product isolated and structurally characterized. The variable R group can be a methyl or 5'-adenosyl group, or a cyanide or hydroxide anion. The "proof" by synthesis of vitamin B_{12} was accomplished in 1972 by the groups of Robert Burns Woodward and Albert Eschenmoser.

In general, the total synthesis of natural products is a non-commercial research activity, aimed at deeper understanding of the synthesis of particular natural product frameworks, and the development of fundamental new synthetic methods. Even so, it is of tremendous commercial and societal importance. By providing challenging synthetic targets, for example, it has played a central role in the development of the field of organic chemistry. Prior to the development of analytical chemistry methods in the twentieth century, the structures of natural products were affirmed by total synthesis (so-called "structure proof by synthesis"). Early efforts in natural products synthesis targeted complex substances such as cobalamin (vitamin B_{12}), an essential cofactor in cellular metabolism.

=== Biomimetic synthesis ===
Biomimetic synthesis is the use of biosynthetic and biologically inspired pathways as a guide for the laboratory synthesis of natural products. This strategy mimics natural biosynthetic routes to produce natural products often with high stereoselectivity and regioselectivity. It simplifies the synthesis of difficult synthetic targets including molecules containing spiro-ring systems and quaternary carbon centers. Biomimetic synthesis typically employs reactions such Diels–Alder, photocycloadditions, cyclizations, and oxidative and free radical transformations. This strategy improves efficiency and economy in drug discovery and chemical biology.

=== Symmetry ===
Examination of dimerized and trimerized natural products has shown that an element of bilateral symmetry is often present. Bilateral symmetry refers to a molecule or system that contains a C_{2}, C_{s}, or C_{2v} point group identity. C_{2} symmetry tends to be much more abundant than other types of bilateral symmetry. This finding sheds light on how these compounds might be mechanistically created, as well as providing insight into the thermodynamic properties that make these compounds more favorable. Density functional theory (DFT), the Hartree–Fock method, and semiempirical calculations also show some favorability for dimerization in natural products due to evolution of more energy per bond than the equivalent trimer or tetramer. This is proposed to be due to steric hindrance at the core of the molecule, as most natural products dimerize and trimerize in a head-to-head fashion rather than head-to-tail.

== Research and teaching ==
Research and teaching activities related to natural products fall into a number of diverse academic areas, including organic chemistry, medicinal chemistry, pharmacognosy, ethnobotany, traditional medicine, and ethnopharmacology. Other biological areas include chemical biology, chemical ecology, chemogenomics, systems biology, molecular modeling, chemometrics, and chemoinformatics.

=== Chemistry ===
Natural products chemistry is a distinct area of chemical research which was important in the development and history of chemistry. Isolating and identifying natural products has been important to source substances for early preclinical drug discovery research, to understand traditional medicine and ethnopharmacology, and to find pharmacologically useful areas of chemical space. To achieve this, many technological advances have been made, such as the evolution of technology associated with chemical separations, and the development of modern methods in chemical structure determination such as NMR. Early attempts to understand the biosynthesis of natural products, saw chemists employ first radiolabelling and more recently stable isotope labeling combined with NMR experiments. In addition, natural products are prepared by organic synthesis, to provide confirmation of their structure, or to give access to larger quantities of natural products of interest. In this process, the structure of some natural products have been revised, and the challenge of synthesising natural products has led to the development of new synthetic methodology, synthetic strategy, and tactics. In this regard, natural products play a central role in the training of new synthetic organic chemists, and are a principal motivation in the development of new variants of old chemical reactions (e.g., the Evans aldol reaction), as well as the discovery of completely new chemical reactions (e.g., the Woodward cis-hydroxylation, Sharpless epoxidation, and Suzuki–Miyaura cross-coupling reactions).

== History ==
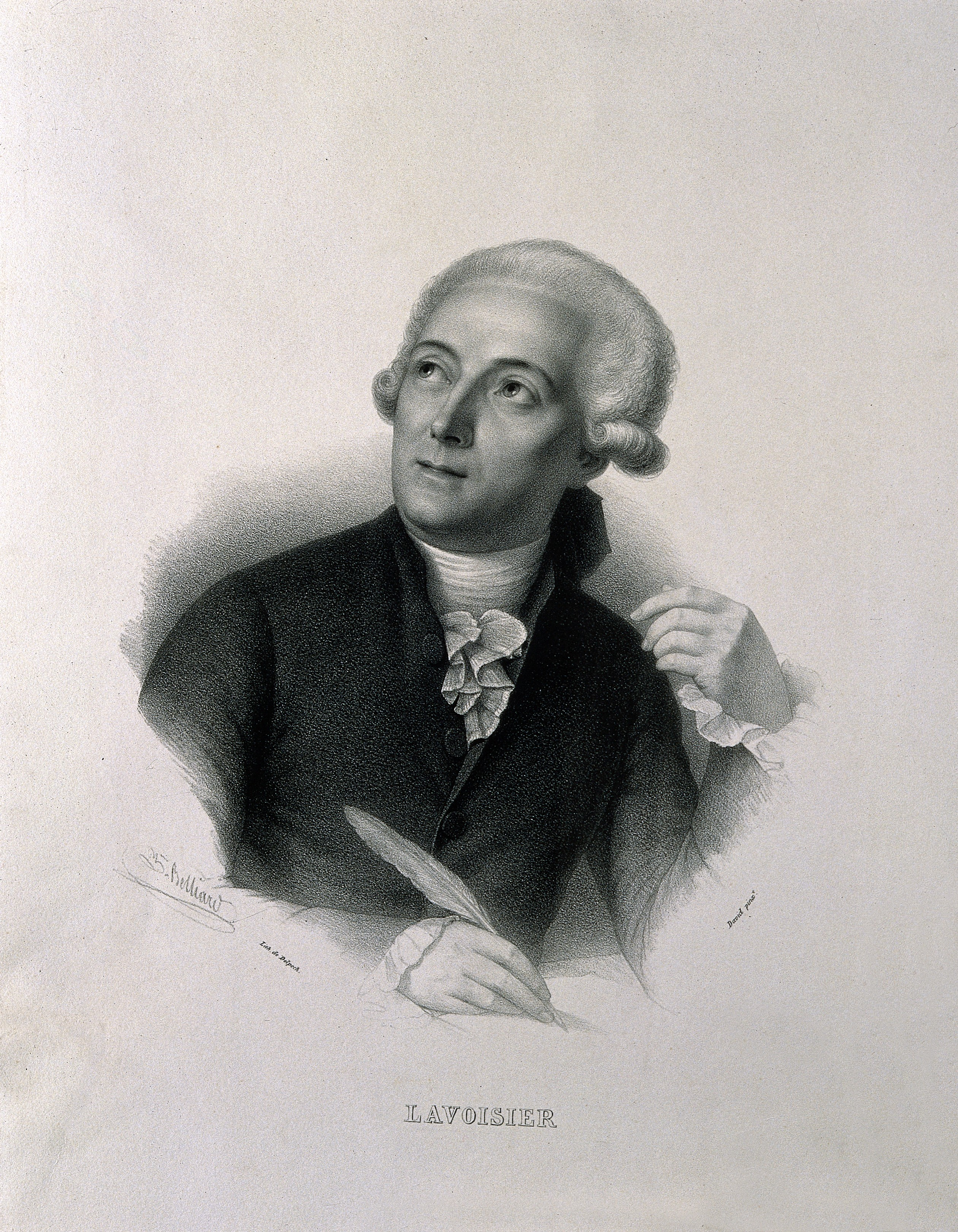
Antoine Lavoisier (1743–1794)

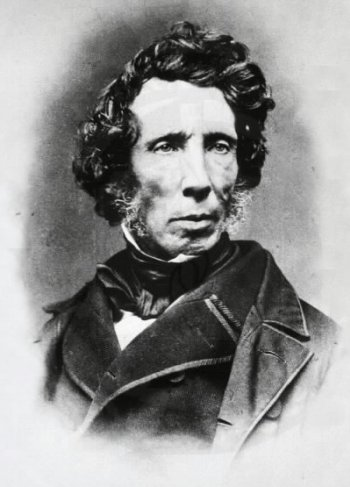
Friedrich Wöhler (1800–1882)

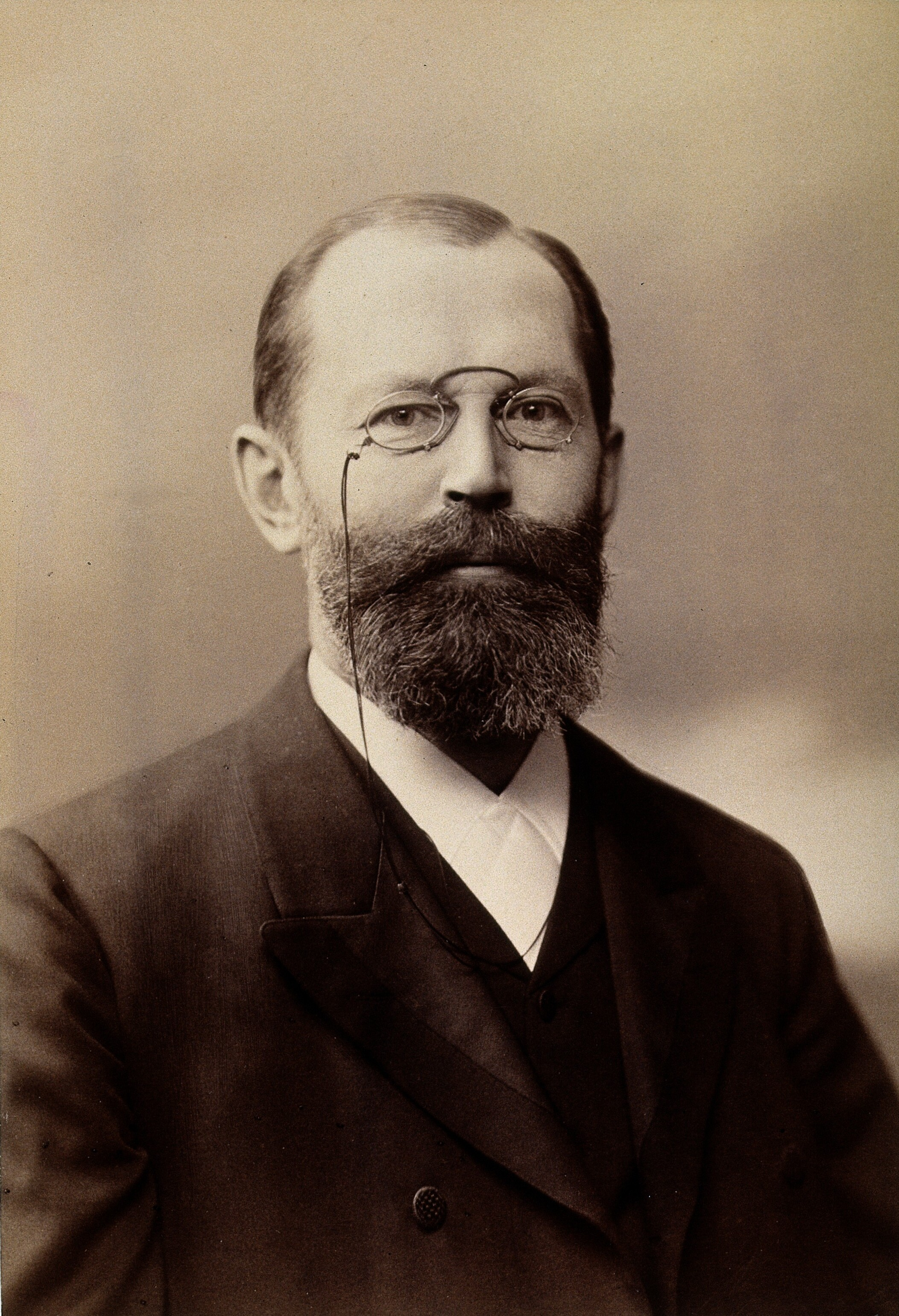
Hermann Emil Fischer (1852–1919)

=== Foundations of organic and natural product chemistry ===
The concept of natural products dates back to the early 19th century, when the foundations of organic chemistry were laid. Organic chemistry was regarded at that time as the chemistry of substances that plants and animals are composed of. It was a relatively complex form of chemistry and stood in stark contrast to inorganic chemistry, the principles of which had been established in 1789 by the Frenchman Antoine Lavoisier in his work Traité Élémentaire de Chimie.

=== Isolation ===
Lavoisier showed at the end of the 18th century that organic substances consisted of a limited number of elements: primarily carbon and hydrogen and supplemented by oxygen and nitrogen. He quickly focused on the isolation of these substances, often because they had an interesting pharmacological activity. Plants were the main source of such compounds, especially alkaloids and glycosides. It was long been known that opium, a sticky mixture of alkaloids (including codeine, morphine, noscapine, thebaine, and papaverine) from the opium poppy (Papaver somniferum), possessed a narcotic and at the same time mind-altering properties. By 1805, morphine had already been isolated by the German chemist Friedrich Sertürner and in the 1870s it was discovered that boiling morphine with acetic anhydride produced a substance with a strong pain suppressive effect: heroin. In 1815, Eugène Chevreul isolated cholesterol, a crystalline substance, from animal tissue that belongs to the class of steroids, and in 1819 strychnine, an alkaloid was isolated.

=== Synthesis ===
A second important step was the synthesis of organic compounds. While the synthesis of inorganic substances had been known for a long time, creating organic substances was a major challenge. In 1827, the Swedish chemist Jöns Jacob Berzelius argued that a vital force or life force was essential for synthesizing organic compounds. This idea, known as vitalism, had many supporters well into the 19th century, even after the introduction of atomic theory. Vitalism also aligned with traditional medicine, which often viewed disease as a result of imbalances in vital energies that distinguish life from nonlife.

The first significant challenge to vitalism came in 1828 when German chemist Friedrich Wöhler synthesized urea, a natural product found in urine, by heating ammonium cyanate, an inorganic substance:

$$\mathrm{NH_4OCN\ \xrightarrow {\ \ 60^{\circ}C \ \ }\ H_2NCONH_2}$$

This reaction demonstrated that a life force was not needed to create organic substances. Initially, this idea faced skepticism, but it gained acceptance 20 years later when Adolph Wilhelm Hermann Kolbe synthesized acetic acid from carbon disulfide. Since then, organic chemistry has developed into a distinct field focused on studying carbon-containing compounds, which were found to be prevalent in nature.

=== Structural theories ===
The third key development was the structure elucidation of organic substances. While the elemental composition of pure organic compounds could be determined accurately, their molecular structures remained unclear. This issue became evident in a dispute between Friedrich Wöhler and Justus von Liebig, who studied silver salts with identical compositions but different properties. Wöhler examined silver cyanate, a harmless compound, while von Liebig investigated the explosive silver fulminate. Elemental analysis showed both salts had the same amounts of silver, carbon, oxygen, and nitrogen, yet their properties differed, contradicting the prevailing view that composition alone determined properties.

This discrepancy was explained by Berzelius's theory of isomers, which proposed that not only the number and type of elements but also the arrangement of atoms affects a compound's properties. This insight led to the development of structural theories, such as the radical theory of Jean-Baptiste Dumas and the substitution theory of Auguste Laurent. A definitive structure theory was proposed in 1858 by August Kekulé, who suggested that carbon is tetravalent and can bond to itself, forming chains found in natural products.

=== Expanding the concept ===
The concept of natural product, which initially based on organic compounds that could be isolated from plants, was extended to include animal material in the middle of the 19th century by the German Justus von Liebig. Hermann Emil Fischer in 1884, turned his attention to the study of carbohydrates and purines, work for which he was awarded the Nobel Prize in 1902. He also succeeded to make synthetically in the laboratory in a variety of carbohydrates, including glucose and mannose. After the discovery of penicillin by Alexander Fleming in 1928, fungi and other micro-organisms were added to the arsenal of sources of natural products.

=== Milestones ===
By the 1930s, several major classes of natural products had been identified and studied extensively. Key milestones in the field of natural product research include:

- Terpenoids and Terpenes: First systematically studied by Otto Wallach (Nobel Prize 1910) and later by Leopold Ružička (Nobel Prize 1939).
- Porphyrin-based dyes: Including chlorophyll and heme, investigated by Richard Willstätter (Nobel Prize 1915) and Hans Fischer (Nobel Prize 1930). These tetrapyrrole compounds play essential roles in various biological processes (including photosynthesis, respiration, electron transfer, and catalysis) and have been the subject of extensive research.
- Steroids: Researched by Heinrich Otto Wieland (Nobel Prize 1927) and Adolf Windaus (Nobel Prize 1928). Their work contributed significantly to our understanding of sterol biosynthesis and structure.
- Carotenoids: Studied by Paul Karrer (Nobel Prize 1937). These pigments are important for their antioxidant properties and roles in photosynthesis and vision.
- Vitamins: Investigated by numerous scientists, including Paul Karrer, Robert R. Williams, Adolf Windaus (Nobel Prize 1928), Norman Haworth (Nobel Prize 1937), Richard Kuhn (Nobel Prize 1938), and Albert Szent-Györgyi (Nobel Prize 1937). The discovery and characterization of vitamins revolutionized our understanding of nutrition and health.
- Steroid hormones: Studied by Adolf Butenandt (Nobel Prize 1939) and Edward Calvin Kendall (Nobel Prize 1950). Their work on steroid hormones paved the way for modern endocrinology.
- Plant-derived alkaloids and anthocyanins: Researched by Robert Robinson (Nobel Prize 1947) and others. Many alkaloids are used as medicines or recreational drugs, while many anthocyanins serve as low-toxicity food preservatives and dyes.
- Peptide hormones: Investigated by Vincent du Vigneaud (Nobel Prize 1955) who completed the first total synthesis of the human peptide hormones oxytocin and vasopressin.
- Total synthesis of natural products: Robert Burns Woodward was awarded a Nobel Prize in 1965 for synthesizing various natural compounds including quinine, cholesterol, cortisone, strychnine, reserpine, chlorophyll, and vitamin B12. Elias James Corey received a Nobel Prize in 1990 for similar achievements, such as the synthesis of gibberellic acid, ginkgolide, and various prostaglandins.

These pioneering studies laid the foundation for our understanding of natural product chemistry and biochemistry, leading to numerous Nobel Prizes in Chemistry and Physiology or Medicine. The field of natural products has continued to evolve, with recent research focusing on the evolutionary and ecological roles of these compounds.

== See also ==
- Appeal to nature
- Biogenic substance
- Naturalistic fallacy
- Pharmacognosy
- Phytotherapy

=== Journals ===
- Chemistry of Natural Compounds
- Journal of Natural Products
- Natural Product Reports
- Natural Product Research
