= Timeline of La Rochelle =

City in Charente-Maritime, France

The following is a timeline of the history of the city of La Rochelle.

== Prior to 20th century ==
- 10th C. – La Rochelle existed under the name of Rupella.
- 1199 – "Communal charter" granted Eleanor, duchess of Aquitaine.
- 1209 – Lantern Tower founded.
- 1219 – La Rochelle besieged during the Albigensian Crusade.^{(fr)}
- 1224 – Siege of La Rochelle (1224) by forces of Louis VIII of France.
- 1298 – Hôtel de Ville completed.
- 1360 – English in power again per Treaty of Brétigny.
- 1372 – June: Naval Battle of La Rochelle; English forces defeated.
- 1384 – Saint Nicolas Tower & The Chain Tower built.
- 1390 – Tour de la Chaîne (tower) built.
- 1468 – Tour de la Lanterne (tower) built.
- 1571 – Seventh national synod of the French reformed churches and affirmation of faith with the Confession de La Rochelle.
- 1573
  - Siege of La Rochelle (1572–73) during the French Wars of Religion.
  - 24 June: Peace of La Rochelle treaty signed.
- 1621 – Blockade of La Rochelle begins during Huguenot rebellion.
- 1627 – Siege of La Rochelle begins.
- 1628 – Siege ends.
- 1648 – Roman Catholic diocese of La Rochelle established.
- 1677 – Carmelite convent built.
- 1694 – Généralité de La Rochelle (administrative entity) created.
- 1719 – Chambre de commerce et d'industrie de La Rochelle established.
- 1732 – Académie des belles-lettres, sciences et arts de La Rochelle founded.
- 1784 – Saint-Louis Cathedral consecrated.
- 1790 – La Rochelle becomes part of the Charente-Inférieure souveraineté.
- 1796 – Archives départementales de la Charente-Maritime established.
- 1797 – Bibliothèque communale de La Rochelle (library) established.
- 1800 – Population: 17,512.
- 1801 – Cantons of La Rochelle Est and Ouest created.
- 1815 – Société littéraire de La Rochelle founded.
- 1829 – L'Echo Rochelais newspaper begins publication.
- 1832 – Muséum d'Histoire naturelle de La Rochelle moves to the Hôtel du Gouvernement.
- 1844 – Musée des beaux-arts de La Rochelle opens in the Hôtel de Crussol d'Uzès.
- 1847 – Fish market opens.
- 1856 – Ligne de Saint-Benoît à La Rochelle-Ville (train) begins operating.
- 1867 – Delmas (shipping company) in business.
- 1888 – Canal de Marans à la Rochelle built.
- 1890 – La Pallice port built.
- 1896 – Population: 28,376.
- 1897 – La Rochelle tramway begins operating.
- 1898 – Atlantique Stade Rochelais rugby club formed.
- 1900 – Café de la Paix (La Rochelle) in business.

== 20th century ==
- 1906 - Population: 33,858.
- 1911 – Jean Guiton monument unveiled in the Place de l’Hôtel de ville.
- 1921 – Orbigny-Bernon Museum opens.
- 1922 – Gare de La Rochelle (train station) built.
- 1926 – Stade Marcel-Deflandre (stadium) opens.
- 1940 – June: German occupation begins.^{(fr)}
- 1943 – La Rochelle submarine pen built by the German Organisation Todt.
- 1944 – September: Allied siege of La Rochelle begins.
- 1945 – May: Allied siege of La Rochelle ends; German forces ousted.
- 1946 – Population: 48,923.
- 1971 – Michel Crépeau elected mayor.
- 1972 – Les Minimes marina constructed.
- 1973
  - Cantons 1, 2, 3, and 4 created.
  - Parc des expositions de La Rochelle built.
- 1975 – Population: 79,757.
- 1978 – Musée du Nouveau Monde (museum) active.
- 1981 – Secteur sauvegardé (protected heritage area) established.
- 1982 – Maison de la Culture opens.
- 1985 – Les Francofolies de La Rochelle music festival begins.
- 1987 – Radio France La Rochelle begins broadcasting.
- 1988
  - Île de Ré bridge and Aquarium de La Rochelle open.
  - École supérieure de commerce de La Rochelle (business school) established.
- 1993 – University of La Rochelle established.
- 1998 – Médiathèque Michel-Crépeau (library) opens.
- 1999 – Agglomeration community of La Rochelle (regional government) created.

== 21st century ==
- 2002 – La Rochelle le journal (municipal newsletter) begins publication.
- 2008
  - March: La Rochelle municipal election, 2008 held.
  - Gare de La Rochelle-Porte Dauphine (train station) opens.
- 2010 – Société rochelaise d'histoire moderne et contemporaine (history society) established.
- 2012 – Population: 80,014.
- 2013 – Semaine Olympique Française La Rochelle sailing race begins.
- 2014 – Jean-François Fountaine becomes mayor.
- 2016 – La Rochelle becomes part of the Nouvelle-Aquitaine administrative region.

== See also ==
- History of La Rochelle
- List of mayors of La Rochelle
- List of bishops of La Rochelle
- List of heritage sites in La Rochelle
- History of Charente-Maritime department and Timeline of Charente-Maritime

Other cities in the Nouvelle-Aquitaine region:

- Timeline of Bordeaux
- Timeline of Limoges
- Timeline of Poitiers

== Bibliography ==
in English

- "La Rochelle" . Encyclopædia Britannica. Vol. 16 (11th ed.). 1910. pp. 222–223.
- "La Rochelle". Southern France (6th ed.). Leipzig: Baedeker. 1914.

in French

- Joanne, Adolphe-Laurent (1862). "La Rochelle". De Poitiers à la Rochelle. Guides Joanne (in French).
- Léopold Delayant (1878). Ville de La Rochelle: catalogue de la bibliothèque (in French).
- Émile Couneau (1904). La Rochelle disparue (in French). A. Foucher – via Gallica.
- "Charente-Inferieure: La Rochelle". Angoumois et Saintonge. À la France: sites et monuments (in French). Paris: Touring-Club de France. 1904.
- "La Rochelle". Dictionnaire Bouillet (in French) (34th ed.). Hachette. 1914. hdl:2027/mdp.39015074817142.
- Rémi Béraud (1987). Petite Encyclopédie Monumentale et Historique de La Rochelle (in French). Édition Rupella.
