= Timeline of Bordeaux =

The following is a timeline of the history of the city of Bordeaux, France.

== Prior to 19th century ==
- 107 BCE – Battle of Burdigala
- 412 CE – Bordeaux taken by forces of Goth Adolphus.
- 732 CE – Bordeaux taken by Umayyad forces
- 1096 – 1 May: Bordeaux Cathedral consecrated.
- 1137 – 25 July: Wedding of Eleanor of Aquitaine and Louis VII of France in Bordeaux Cathedral.
- 1152 – 18 May: Wedding of Eleanor of Aquitaine and Henry II of England
- 1154 – Aquitaine passes under the control of English Kings.
- 1441 – University of Bordeaux founded.
- 1453 – Battle of Castillon, Bordeaux and Aquitaine pass from English to French control.
- 1460 – Hâ Fort built.
- 1486 – Printing press in operation.
- 1494 – Porte du Caillau (gate) built.
- 1500 – Tour Pey-Berland built.
- 1533 – College of Guienne founded.
- 1548 – Locals resist the salt-tax (Gabelle) and were punished by Anne de Montmorency.
- 1581 – Michel de Montaigne becomes mayor.
- 1676 – Église Saint-Paul-Saint-François-Xavier de Bordeaux consecrated.
- 1712 – Bordeaux Academy established.
- 1740 – Bordeaux municipal library opens.
- 1775 – Place de la Bourse built.
- 1778 – Palais Rohan completed.
- 1780 – Grand Théâtre de Bordeaux inaugurated.
- 1790 – Bordeaux becomes part of the Gironde souveraineté.
- 1793 – Population: 104,676.
- 1796 – Archives départementales de la Gironde established.

== 19th century ==
- 1801 – Musée des Beaux-Arts de Bordeaux established.
- 1802 – Chamber of Commerce established.
- 1814 – Declared itself for the House of Bourbon.
- 1818 – Linnean Society of Bordeaux founded.
- 1820 – Population: 92,375.
- 1822 – Pont de pierre (bridge) opens.
- 1831 – Maurel & Prom in business.
- 1834 – Société de Pharmacie de Bordeaux founded.
- 1835 – City hall moves to the Palais Rohan.
- 1841 – Population: 104,686.
- 1858 – Jardin botanique de Bordeaux established.
- 1860 – Passerelle Eiffel (bridge) built.
- 1861 – Population: 162,750.
- 1862 – 13 July: City hall burns down.
- 1866 – Population: 194,241.
- 1872 – Petite Gironde newspaper begins publication.
- 1874 – Société de géographie commerciale de Bordeaux (geographical society) founded.
- 1876 – Population: 215,140.
- 1880 – Société bordelaise de Crédit Industriel et Commercial established.
- 1898 – Bontou's cuisine bordelaise cookbook published.

== 20th century ==
- 1903 – July: 1903 Tour de France passes through Bordeaux.
- 1906 – Population: 237,707.
- 1907 – Construction of new docks was begun.
- 1911 – Population: 261,678.
- 1932 – Rex cinema opens.
- 1938 – Stade du Parc Lescure opens.
- 1940 – BETASOM submarine base established by Italian forces.
- 1944 – Sud-Ouest newspaper begins publication.
- 1962 – France 3 Aquitaine television begins broadcasting.
- 1963 – Musée d'Aquitaine established.
- 1964 – Sister city relationship established with Los Angeles, USA.
- 1965 – Pont Saint-Jean (Bordeaux) (bridge) opens.
- 1967 – Pont d'Aquitaine (bridge) built.
- 1968
  - Bordeaux Métropole established.
  - Population: 266,662.
- 1970 – Bordeaux Segalen University established.
- 1980 – Orchestre National Bordeaux Aquitaine active.
- 1988 – Bordeaux International School established.
- 1992 – Socialist Party national congress held in Bordeaux.
- 1995 – Alain Juppé becomes mayor.
- 1998 – Some 1998 FIFA World Cup football games held in Bordeaux.

== 21st century ==
- 2003 – Bordeaux tramway begins operating.
- 2004
  - Station Hôtel de Ville (Tram de Bordeaux) opens.
  - Hugues Martin becomes mayor.
- 2006 – Alain Juppé becomes mayor again.
- 2007
  - Port of the Moon designated an UNESCO World Heritage Site.
  - Population: 235,178.
- 2012 – Population: 241,287.
- 2013 – Pont Jacques Chaban-Delmas (bridge) opens.
- 2015 – December: Aquitaine-Limousin-Poitou-Charentes regional election, 2015 held.
- 2016 – Bordeaux becomes part of the Nouvelle-Aquitaine region.
- 2017 – Population: 254,436.
- 2023 – Population: 267,991.

== See also ==
- Bordeaux history
- History of Bordeaux
- List of mayors of Bordeaux
- List of heritage sites in Bordeaux

Other cities in the Nouvelle-Aquitaine region:

- Timeline of La Rochelle
- Timeline of Limoges
- Timeline of Poitiers

== Bibliography ==
=== in English ===
- Richard Brookes (1786), "Bourdeaux", The General Gazetteer (6th ed.), London: J.F.C. Rivington
- "Bordeaux", Handbook for Travellers in France, London: John Murray, 1861
- Frederick Martin (1867), "The Four Great Cities of France: Bordeaux", Commercial Handbook of France, London: Longmans, Green, OCLC 4471325
- George Henry Townsend (1867), "Bordeaux", Manual of Dates (2nd ed.), London: Frederick Warne & Co.
- William Henry Overall, ed. (1870). "Bordeaux". Dictionary of Chronology. London: William Tegg. hdl:2027/uc2.ark:/13960/t9m32q949.
- John Ramsay McCulloch (1880), "Bordeaux", in Hugh G. Reid (ed.), A Dictionary, Practical, Theoretical and Historical of Commerce and Commercial Navigation, London: Longmans, Green, and Co.
- "Bordeaux". Chambers's Encyclopaedia. London. 1901. hdl:2027/hvd.hn52jk.
- Georges Goyau (1907). "Bordeaux". Catholic Encyclopedia. New York.
- "Bordeaux" . Encyclopædia Britannica. Vol. 4 (11th ed.). 1910. pp. 244–245.
- "Bordeaux", Southern France (6th ed.), Leipzig: Baedeker, 1914
- Daniel C. Haskell, ed. (1922), "Provencal literature and language, including the local history of southern France", Bulletin of the New York Public Library, vol. 26, hdl:2027/mdp.39015035117657, "Local history: Bordeaux"
- Robert E. Dickinson (1961). "Structure of the French City: Bordeaux". The West European City (2nd ed.). Routledge. ISBN 978-1-136-25970-8.
- Trudy Ring, ed. (1995). "Bordeaux". Northern Europe. International Dictionary of Historic Places. Fitzroy Dearborn. ISBN 978-1-136-63944-9.
- Colum Hourihane, ed. (2012). "Bordeaux". Grove Encyclopedia of Medieval Art and Architecture. Oxford University Press. p. 67+. ISBN 978-0-19-539536-5.
- François Hubert, Christian Block and Jacques de Cauna (2018). Bordeaux in the 18th century: trans-Atlantic trading and slavery (2nd ed.). Bordeaux: Le Festin. ISBN 978-2-36062-009-8.
- Chantal Callais and Thierry Jeanmonod (2019). Bordeaux: a history of architecture. La Crèche: La Geste. ISBN 979-10-353-0188-0.

=== in French ===
- Almanach général, civil, militaire, commercial et maritime de la sénatorerie de Bordeaux (in French). Foulquier. 1807.
- Jean-Baptiste-Joseph Champagnac [in French] (1839). "Bordeaux". Manuel des dates, en forme de dictionnaire (in French). Perisse frères.
- Eusèbe Girault de Saint-Fargeau [in French] (1850). "Bordeaux". Guide pittoresque: portatif et complet, du voyageur en France (in French) (3rd ed.). Paris: Firmin Didot frères. p. 184. hdl:2027/uiug.30112081968700.
- Bordeaux. Guides Joanne (in French). Hachette. 1902. hdl:2027/uc1.c105602300.
- Ch. Brossard (1903). "Guyenne-Gascone: Gironde: Description des villes: Bordeaux". La France du Sud-Ouest. Géographie pittoresque et monumentale de la France (in French). Flammarion. hdl:2027/nyp.33433066581137. (Table of contents)
- "Bordeaux". Dictionnaire Bouillet (in French) (34th ed.). Hachette. 1914. hdl:2027/mdp.39015074817142.
