= Brevione C =

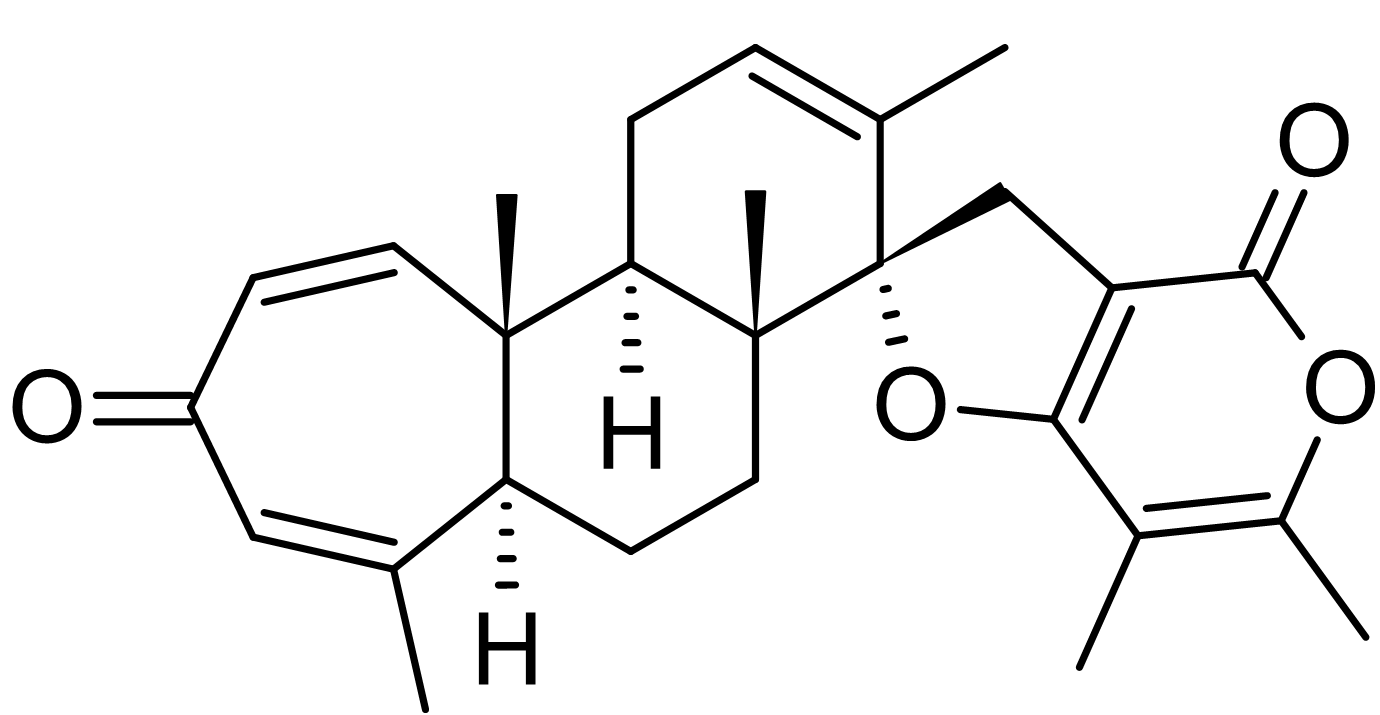

Names
- IUPAC name (2R,4'aS,6'aR,11'aR,11'bS)-3',4'a,6,7,7',11'a-hexamethylspiro[3H-furo[3,2-c]pyran-2,4'-5,6,6a,11b-tetrahydro-1H-cyclohepta[a]naphthalene]-4,9'-dione

Identifiers
3D model (JSmol)	Interactive image
ChEBI	CHEBI:205774
ChemSpider	78436166; 26000631
PubChem CID	139585565
- InChI: InChI=1S/C27H32O4/c1-15-13-19(28)9-11-25(5)21(15)10-12-26(6)22(25)8-7-16(2)27(26)14-20-23(31-27)17(3)18(4)30-24(20)29/h7,9,11,13,21-22H,8,10,12,14H2,1-6H3/t21-,22+,25-,26+,27-/m1/s1 Key: YIMHQYHZZQFOJT-YFSQZJJESA-N
- SMILES: CC1=CC[C@@H]2[C@@]([C@@]13CC4=C(O3)C(=C(OC4=O)C)C)(CC[C@H]5[C@]2(C=CC(=O)C=C5C)C)C

Properties
Chemical formula	C_{27}H_{32}O_{4}
Molar mass	420.549 g·mol^{−1}
Appearance	Colorless solid
Melting point	247.7 °C (477.9 °F; 520.8 K) (decomposes)
- Except where otherwise noted, data are given for materials in their standard state (at 25 °C [77 °F], 100 kPa). Infobox references

Brevione C is a spiroditerpenoid fungal metabolite first isolated from Penicillium brevicompactum. Brevione C and related compounds have been shown to exhibit phytotoxic properties, while other members of the larger family of breviones may also act as cytotoxins or anti inflammatory agents. Originally extracted from biomaterial, a total synthesis route for brevione C, alongside breviones A and B, has been developed.

== Proposed biosynthesis ==
The biosynthesis of brevione C is proposed to occur from precursor molecules originating from the mevalonate pathway for the diterpenic moiety, and a cyclic polyketide derivative originating from the acetate pathway.

Geranylgeranyl pyrophosphate is believed to condense with the cyclic polyketide derivative forming a universal precursor, which undergoes cyclization, oxidation and rearrangement steps to form the breviones B,A and C successively.
