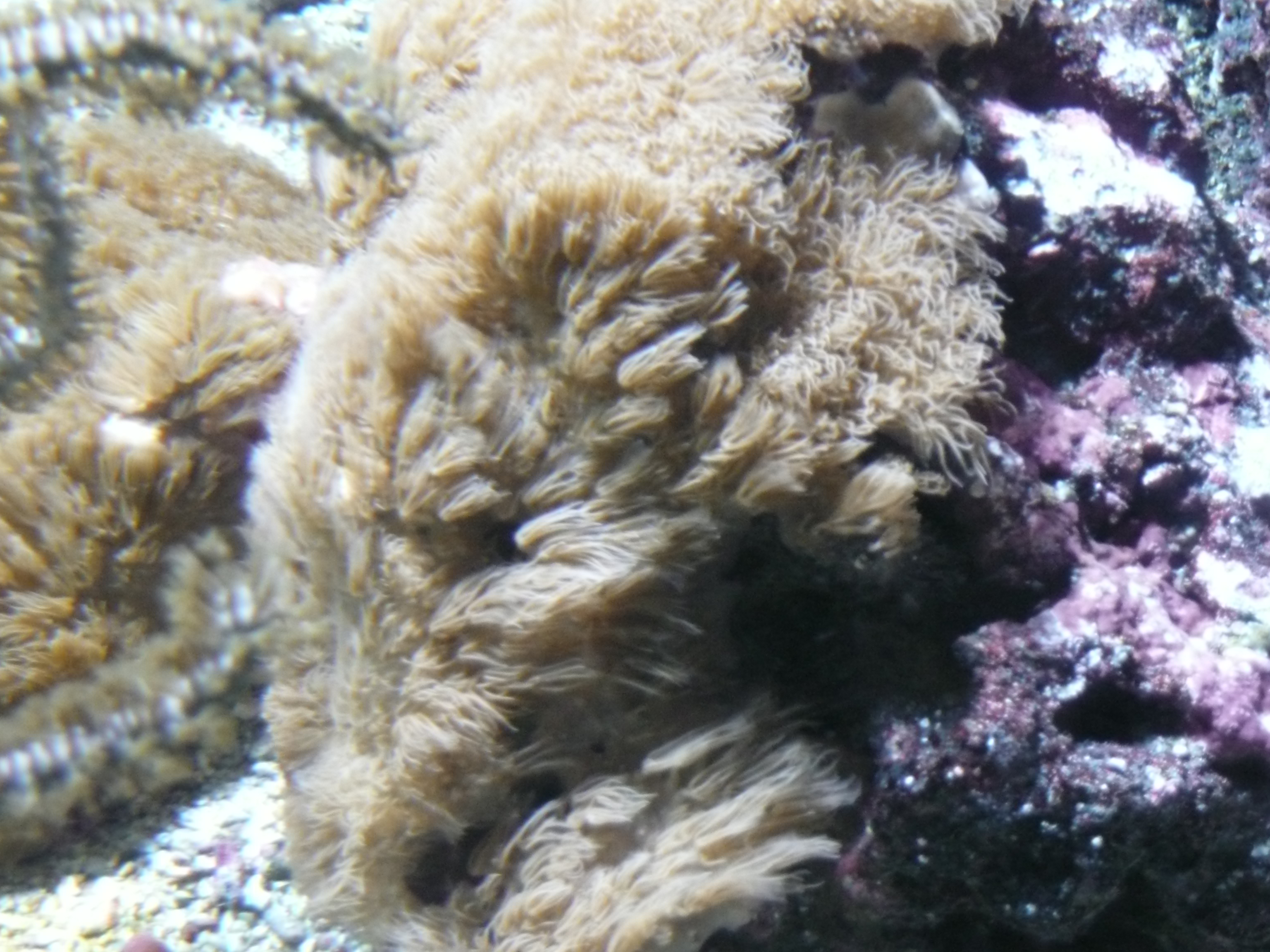
- Erythropodium caribaeorum in the Aquarium de La Rochelle

Scientific classification
- Kingdom: Animalia
- Phylum: Cnidaria
- Subphylum: Anthozoa
- Class: Octocorallia
- Order: Scleralcyonacea
- Family: Erythropodiidae
- Genus: Erythropodium
- Species: E. caribaeorum

Binomial name
- Erythropodium caribaeorum (Duchassaing & Michelotti, 1860)

Synonyms
- Erythropodium carybaeorum Kölliker, 1865

= Erythropodium caribaeorum =

Species of coral

Erythropodium caribaeorum, commonly known as the encrusting gorgonian or encrusting polyps, is a species of soft coral in the monotypic family Erythropodiidae. It was formerly placed in subfamily Erythropodiinae of family Anthothelidae.

The species inhabits coral reefs and rocky bottoms in the Caribbean, Bahamas, and Florida, growing at depths of 0.5 to 25 metres.

E. caribaeorum is of interest from a drug discovery perspective because it produces eleutherobin, a diterpene glycoside with potential anticancer activity.
