= Timeline of Poitiers =

The following is a timeline of the history of the city of Poitiers, France.

== Prior to 20th century ==
- 1st C. CE – Roman baths built.
- 2nd C. CE – Roman Poitiers Amphitheatre built.
- 2nd–3rd C. – Roman Catholic Archdiocese of Poitiers established.
- 4th C. CE – Baptistère Saint-Jean and Église Saint-Hilaire le Grand (church) built.
- 350-367 - Hilary of Poitiers first bishop of Poitiers.
- 418 – Region of southwest Gaul ceded to Visigoths per treaty.
- 507 – Battle of Vouillé fought near Poitiers; Franks win.
- 552 – Holy Cross Abbey (Poitiers) founded.
- 732 – 10 October: Battle of Tours fought near Poitiers; Frankish forces defeat Mohammedans.
- 10th C. – Église Saint-Hilaire le Grand rebuilding begins.
- 955 – Siege of Poitiers (955).
- 11th C. – Église Notre-Dame la Grande, Poitiers (church) rebuilt.
- 1018 – Palace of Poitiers destroyed by fire.
- 1096 – Saint-Jean de Montierneuf Abbey built.
- 1099 – Church of Sainte-Radegonde (Poitiers) dedicated.
- 1122-1204 - Eleanor of Aquitaine was born, lived and died in Poitiers.
- 1162 – Poitiers Cathedral construction begins.
- 1199 – "Communal rights" granted to Poitiers.
- 1356 – 19 September: Battle of Poitiers fought during the Hundred Years' War; English forces defeat French.
- 1373 - Bertrand du Guesclin in power.
- 1431 – University of Poitiers founded.
- 1432 - Charles VII of France proclaimed king.
- 1569 – City (unsuccessfully) besieged by Gaspard II de Coligny during the French Wars of Religion.
- 1570s – Des Roches literary salon established.
- 1770 – Blossac Park created, an historic private garden.
- 1778 – Pont Neuf (Poitiers) (bridge) built over the Clain river.
- 1790 – Poitiers becomes part of the Vienne souveraineté.
- 1793 – Population: 18,284.
- 1801 – Canton de Poitiers-Sud and Canton de Poitiers-Nord created.
- 1817 – Société d'agriculture, belles-lettres et arts de Poitiers founded.
- 1834 – Société des antiquaires de l'Ouest founded.
- 1851
  - Courrier de la Vienne newspaper begins publication.
  - Poitiers station opened.
- 1863 – L'Echo du Poitou newspaper in publication.
- 1875 – Hôtel de Ville (city hall) built.
- 1895 – Horse-drawn Poitiers tram begins operating.
- 1898 – Société de géographie de Poitiers founded.

== 20th century ==
- 1906 - Population: 31,532.
- 1911 – Population: 41,242.
- 1921 – Poitiers FC (football club) formed.
- 1922 – Bitard student group formed.
- 1944 – June: Bombing by Allied forces during World War II.^{(fr)}
- 1954 – Poitiers Municipal Theatre built on the Place du Maréchal-Leclerc.
- 1958 – Regional Centre Presse (Vienne) newspaper begins publication.
- 1973 – Cantons 1, 2, 3, 4, and 5 created.
- 1974 – Musée Sainte-Croix (museum) built.
- 1977 – Jacques Santrot becomes mayor.
- 1982
  - Cantons 6 and 7 created.
  - Orchestre Poitou-Charentes formed.
- 1984 – University's École nationale supérieure d'ingénieurs de Poitiers established.
- 1987 – Futuroscope theme park opens near Poitiers.
- 1989 – Stade de la Pépinière (stadium) opens.
- 1990 – 1990 Tour de France bicycle race departs from Futuroscope.
- 1999 – Agglomeration community Grand Poitiers (regional government) created.

== 21st century ==
- 2004
  - Autobus de Poitiers begins operating.
  - Marathon Poitiers-Futuroscope begins.
- 2008
  - Théâtre Auditorium de Poitiers opens.
  - Alain Claeys becomes mayor.
  - Poitiers grand mosque construction begins.^{(en)}
  - University's Festival du film environnemental de Poitiers begins.
- 2013 – Population: 87,427 city; 138,923 agglomeration.
- 2014 – March: Municipal election held.^{(fr)}
- 2015 – May: Socialist Party (France) national congress held in Poitiers.
- 2016 – Poitiers becomes part of the Nouvelle-Aquitaine region.

== See also ==
- History of Poitiers
- List of mayors of Poitiers
- List of bishops of Poitiers
- List of counts of Poitiers
- List of heritage sites in Poitiers
- History of Vienne department

Other cities in the Nouvelle-Aquitaine region:

- Timeline of Bordeaux
- Timeline of Limoges
- Timeline of La Rochelle

== Bibliography ==
- "Poitiers" . Encyclopædia Britannica. Vol. 21 (11th ed.). 1910. pp. 897–899.
