= Raymond Sudre =

French sculptor (1870-1962)

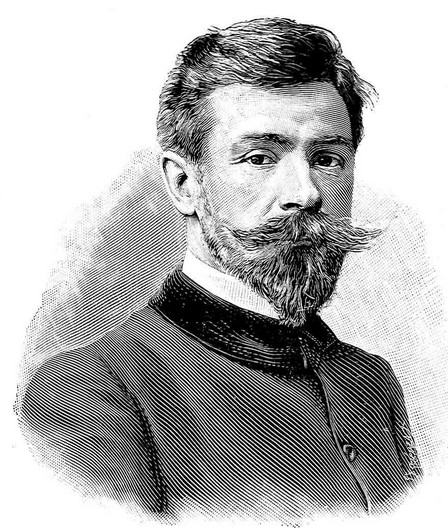
- Sudre in 1910
- Born: October 28, 1870; Perpignan, France
- Died: August 9, 1962 (aged 91)
- Occupation: Sculptor

Raymond Sudre (1870-1962) was a French sculptor.

== Early life ==
Raymond Sudre was born on October 29, 1870, in Perpignan, France. He was tutored by sculptors Antonin Mercié and Alexandre Falguière.

== Career ==
Sudre was a sculptor. He designed a bust of the Count of Blossac in the Blossac Park in Poitiers. He also designed the World War I memorial in Ille-sur-Têt. Additionally, he designed the Fontaine des Amours de Bagatelle on the grounds of the Château de Bagatelle in the 16th arrondissement of Paris.

SudreHe won the Prix de Rome in 1900. He visited Quebec in 1929.

Sudre became a Knight of the Legion of Honour in 1914, and he was promoted to Officer in 1938.

== Death ==
Sudre died in 1962.
