= Blossac =

Blossac may refer to:

== People ==
- Bernard Blossac (1917-2002), French fashion illustrator.

== Locations ==
- Blossac Park, a historic garden and park in Poitiers, France.
- Hôtel de Blossac, a historic building in Rennes, France.
