= Beutenberg Campus =

Coordinates: 50.9095°N 11.5700°E

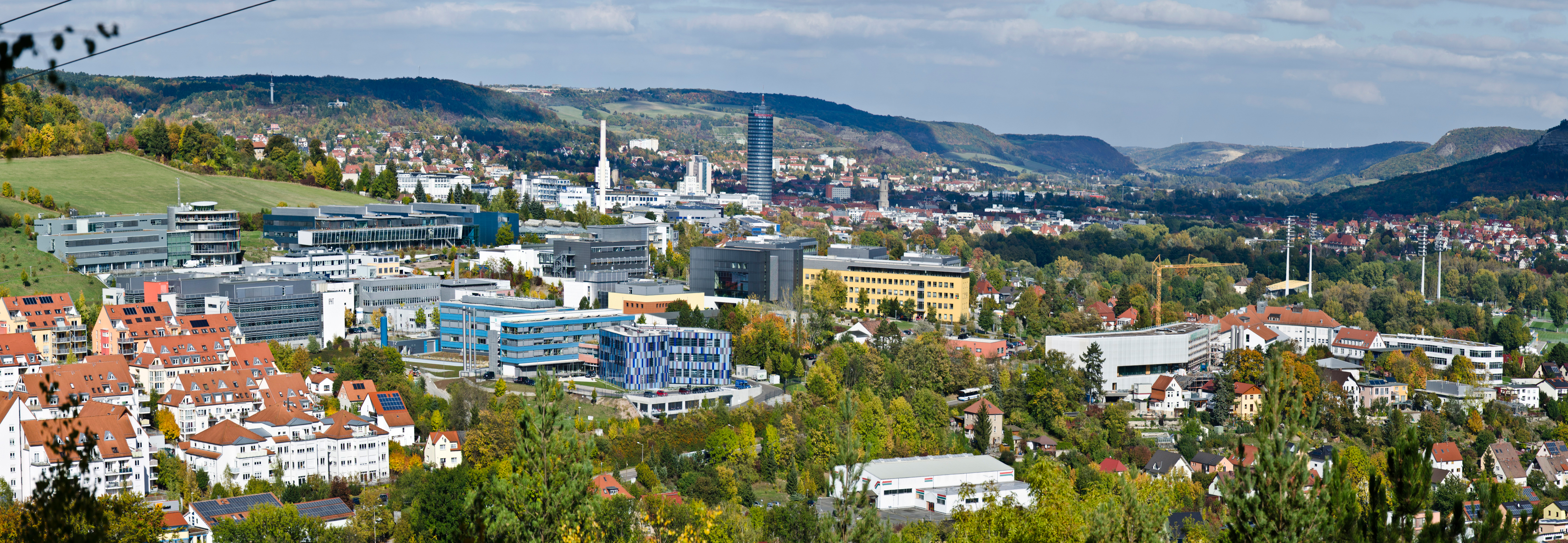
Beutenberg Campus 2012

The Beutenberg Campus is a science and research site situated in southern Jena, Germany. The physician Hans Knöll founded the first biomedical research institute at Beutenberg in 1950. From 1970, it was run as the Central Institute of Microbiology and Experimental Therapy (Zentralinstitut für Mikrobiologie und experimentelle Therapie - ZIMET) of the Academy of Sciences of the GDR. From 1982 institutes focussing on physics were also set up on the site. Following German reunification in 1990, a multidisciplinary science and research centre was created in response to a recommendation by the German Council of Science and Humanities.

The campus currently hosts nine research institutes. These include three Leibniz Association institutes, two Max Planck Society institutes, one Fraunhofer Society institute, one institute funded by the State of Thuringia, as well as Friedrich Schiller University institutes. Two start-up centres, the Technology and Innovation Park Jena and the Bioinstrumentation centre, host more than 50 companies. In addition, Wacker Biotech GmbH has established biotechnology production facilities on campus.

Beutenberg Campus offers an interdisciplinary knowledge and technology platform for work in innovative research. It is a competence centre for research in terms of the guidelines Life Science meets Physics. The areas of biology, natural product chemistry, environmental research and medicine complement the physics of optics, photonics and optical microsystems.

Over 2300 people currently work on the Campus, more than 1000 are scientists. German and foreign students pursue their PhDs in association with one of the seven international research schools and in close cooperation with the Friedrich Schiller University of Jena.

== Beutenberg Campus Jena e.V. ==
In 1998 the Institutes on Campus organised themselves into the Campus Association. This non-profit Campus Association provides a platform for interdisciplinary cooperation, for representing campus activities to the outside world and for developing strategies for added value synergies between the members. For example, the Campus Association annually grants its most talented young scientists the Campus Award in Life Science and Physics. The Association organises scientific talks by internationally renowned scientists, presents campus research activities to the public in an accessible manner and represents the interests of the members in relation to politicians and civil servants.

== Research institutes ==
- BioCentiv GmbH - BioInstrumentation Centre
- Fraunhofer Institute for Applied Optics and Precision Engineering
- Friedrich Schiller University Jena
  - Institute of Applied Physics
  - Center for Innovation Competence Septomics
  - Centre for Molecular Biomedicine
- Institute of Photonic Technology (IPHT)
- Leibniz Institute for Age Research - Fritz Lipmann Institute (FLI)
- Leibniz Institute for Natural Product Research and Infection Biology - Hans Knöll Institute (HKI)
- Max Planck Institute for Biogeochemistry
- Max Planck Institute for Chemical Ecology
- Technology and Innovation Park Jena
- University Clinic Jena, Friedrich Schiller University - Institute of Virology and Antiviral Therapy
- Wacker Biotech GmbH

== Awards ==
Germany - Land of Ideas: Ausgewählter Ort 2006
