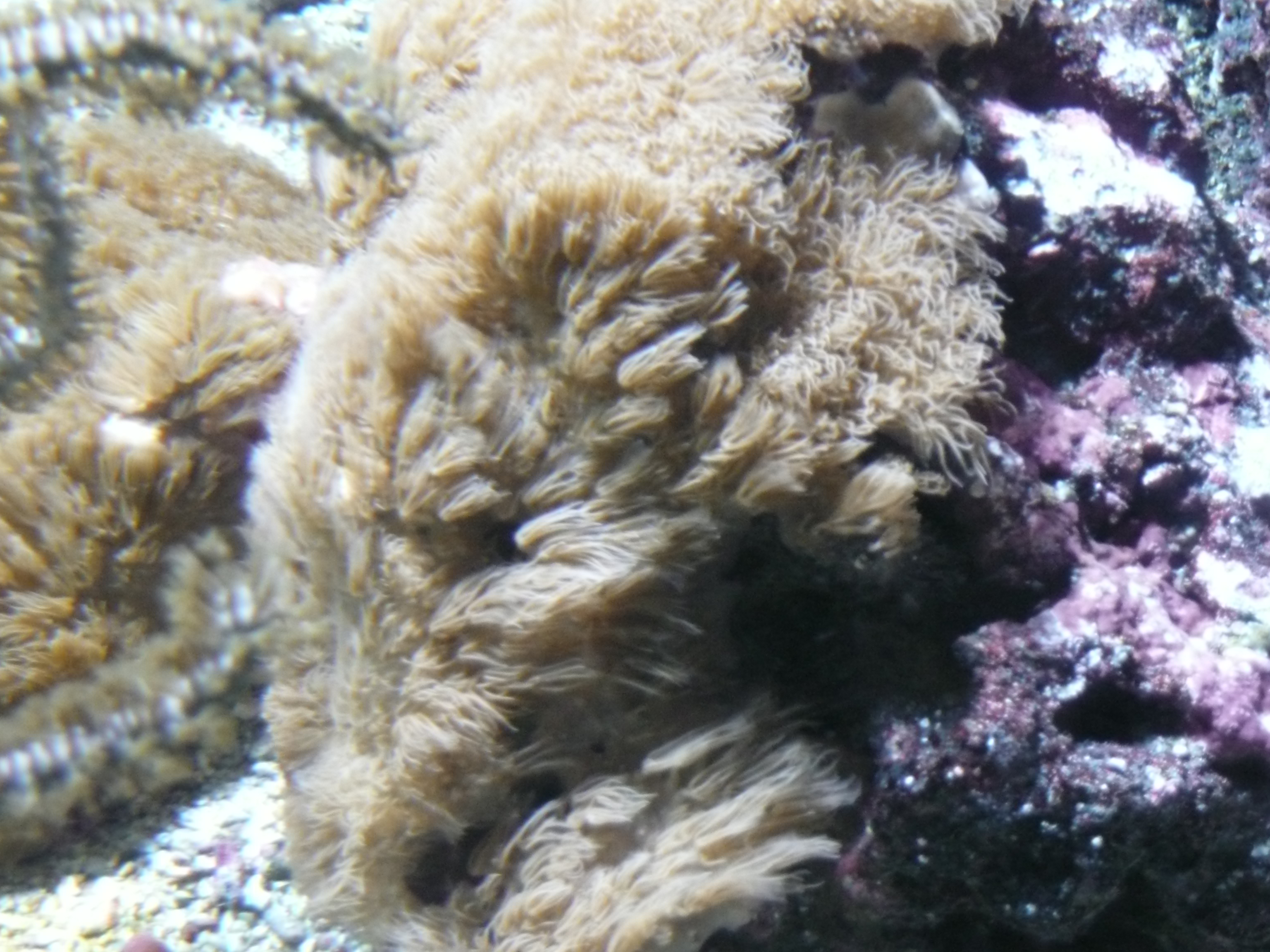
- Erythropodium caribaeorum in the Aquarium de La Rochelle

Scientific classification
- Kingdom: Animalia
- Phylum: Cnidaria
- Subphylum: Anthozoa
- Class: Octocorallia
- Order: Scleralcyonacea
- Family: Erythropodiidae
- Genus: Erythropodium; Kölliker, 1865

= Erythropodium =

Genus of Anthothelid soft corals

Erythropodium is a genus of soft coral in the monotypic family Erythropodiidae. It was formerly placed in family Anthothelidae.

== Species ==
The following species are recognized:

- Erythropodium caribaeorum (Duchassaing & Michelotti, 1860)
- Erythropodium hicksoni (Utinomi, 1972)
- Erythropodium salomonense Thomson & Mackinnon, 1910
- Erythropodium taoyuanensis Tu & Dai, 2022
