= Chemistry of Natural Compounds =

- Discipline: Chemistry of natural compounds
- Language: English
- Edited by: Sh. Sh. Sagdullaev

Publication details
- History: 1965-present
- Publisher: Springer Science+Business Media
- Frequency: Bimonthly
- Impact factor: 0.809 (2020)

Standard abbreviations
- ISO 4: Chem. Nat. Compd.

Indexing
- CODEN: CHNCA8
- ISSN: 0009-3130 (print); 1573-8388 (web)
- LCCN: sf78000632
- OCLC no.: 300183478

Links
- Journal homepage; Online access

Chemistry of Natural Compounds is a bimonthly peer-reviewed scientific journal covering research on the chemistry of natural compounds. It was established in 1965 and is published by Springer Science+Business Media. The editor-in-chief is Sh. Sh. Sagdullaev.

According to the Journal Citation Reports, the journal had an impact factor of 0.809 in 2020.
