= Fraunhofer Institute for Applied Optics and Precision Engineering =

Research institute in Jena, Germany

- Other name: German: Fraunhofer-Institut für Angewandte Optik und Feinmechanik; Fraunhofer IOF; IOF
- Parent institution: Fraunhofer-Gesellschaft
- Established: 1992; 34 years ago
- Focus: Applied research in optics and precision engineering
- Director: Andreas Tünnermann
- Staff: 330 (as of 2020)
- Budget: €51.5 million (as of 2020)
- Location: Jena, Thuringia, Germany
- Coordinates: 50°54′31″N 11°34′09″E
- Interactive map of Fraunhofer Institute for Applied Optics and Precision Engineering
- Website: iof.fraunhofer.de (in German)

The Fraunhofer Institute for Applied Optics and Precision Engineering (German: Fraunhofer-Institut für Angewandte Optik und Feinmechanik), also referred to as the Fraunhofer IOF and abbreviated as IOF, is a research institute of the Fraunhofer Society, located in Jena, Thuringia, Germany. Its activities are attributed to applied research and development in the branch of natural sciences in the field of optics and precision engineering. The institute was founded in 1992.

== Research and development ==
Building upon the experience of the Jena region in the field of surface and thin film technologies for optics, the Fraunhofer IOF conducts research and development in the area of optical systems aiming at enhancing the control of light – from its generation and manipulation to its actual use. The combination of competences in the areas of optics and precision engineering is particularly important.

The focuses also result in the department structure:

- Opto-mechanical System Design
- Micro and Nano-structured Optics
- Opto-mechatronical Components and Systems
- Precision Optical Components and Systems
- Functional Optical Surfaces and Layers
- Laser- and Fiber Technology
- Imaging and Sensing
- Emerging Technologies
- see also: thin film technology, surface physics, microstructure technology, nanotechnology, micro-optics, measurement technology, quantum technology

== CMN-Optics ==
In July 2006, the Fraunhofer IOF opened the Center for Advanced Micro- and Nano-Optics (CMN-Optics). The core of the facility is the SB350-OS electron beam lithography system. This device, also known as an "electron beam recorder", allows minimal structure sizes in the range of 50 newton-metres (37 lbf⋅ft) with a high accuracy on substrate sizes up to 300 millimetres (12 in). The center is operated jointly with the Institute for Applied Physics (IAP) of the University of Jena. The facility is also used by the Institute for Photonic Technologies (IPHT), Jena. The facility cost €12 million and was financed by the European Union, the Free State of Thuringia and the Fraunhofer Society.

== Cooperations ==
In 2003, the Fraunhofer Society concluded a cooperation agreement with the Friedrich Schiller University of Jena. It is the basis for collaboration between Fraunhofer IOF staff and the staff of the Institute of Applied Physics at the University of Jena. The aim of the cooperation is to provide practical training for the students, to improve the implementation of research results into practice and to share the high-quality equipment and infrastructures of both institutions.

== Infrastructure ==
As of 2020, Fraunhofer IOF had almost 330 employees, most of whom are scientists and technicians. The operating budget for the Fraunhofer IOF was €51.5 million in the 2020 financial year.

The Fraunhofer IOF has been headed by Andreas Tünnermann since 2003, who is also Director of the Institute of Applied Physics at the Friedrich Schiller University in Jena.

The institute has excellently equipped laboratories on a 3,830-square-metre (41,200 sq ft) site with 1,115 square metres (12,000 sq ft) of clean rooms (ISO class 1 - ISO class 7), a mechanics workshop that meets the highest demands, as well as a test field for extensive testing and demonstration purposes. In 2002 and 2013 expansion facilities were built on the Beutenberg Campus in Jena. In 2017 a fiber technology center was inaugurated at Fraunhofer IOF, which includes new special laboratories for the production of active and passive micro- and nanostructured optical fibers and one of the world's most powerful fiber drawing towers.

== Awards ==
The institute has received the German Future Prize in the following years:

- 2007: In cooperation with the semi-conductor manufacturer company Osram Opto Semiconductors from Regensburg, researchers from the Fraunhofer Institute in Jena, headed by Andreas Bräuer, received the German Future Prize worth EUR 250,000 on December 6. Their innovation consisted of improved chips, packages and a special optical system that enable more powerful light-emitting diodes.
- 2013: Stefan Nolte from the Fraunhofer Institute for Applied Optics and Precision Engineering (IOF) and Friedrich Schiller University Jena were together with Jens König (Robert Bosch GmbH) and Dirk Sutter (Trumpf Lasers) awarded for their work with ultra-short pulse lasers on December 4, 2013.
- 2020: For their project "EUV Lithography - New Light for the Digital Age", the team of experts led by Sergiy Yulin (Fraunhofer IOF), Peter Kürz (ZEISS Semiconductor Manufacturing Technology (SMT) division), and Michael Kösters (TRUMPF Lasersystems for Semiconductor Manufacturing) was awarded the prize for technology and innovation.
