= Timeline of Limoges =

The following is a timeline of the history of the city of Limoges, France.

== Prior to 20th century ==
- 11 BCE – Settlement renamed "Augustoritum."
- 1st C. CE – Roman Catholic Diocese of Limoges established.
- 2nd C. CE – Limoges amphitheatre built.
- 4th C. CE - It was again called Lemovices
- 5th C. CE - Devastated by the Vandals and the Visigoths
- 848 - Abbey of Saint Martial, Limoges founded.
- 1029 & 1031 – Ecclesiastical councils held in Limoges.
- 1095 – Pope Urban II held a "Synod of bishops".
- 13th C. – Saint-Étienne Bridge and Saint-Martial Bridge built.
- 1273 – Limoges Cathedral construction begins.
- 1370 – Siege of Limoges.
- 1495 – Printing press in operation.
- 1525 – Lycée Gay-Lussac (Limoges) (school) founded.
- 1589 – Limoges becomes seat of Limousin province.
- 1611 – Catholic "white" and "gray" confraternities of penitents established.
- 1615 – Fontaine des Barres installed.
- 1626 – University of Limoges, School of Medicine established.
- 1630 – Plague.
- 1712 – Place Dauphine created.
- 1759 – Société royale d'agriculture de Limoges established.
- 1768 – Château de Beauvais (Limoges) built.
- 1771 – Manufacture of Limoges porcelain begins.
- 1790
  - Fire.
  - Limoges becomes part of the Haute-Vienne souveraineté.
- 1791 - Abbey of Saint Martial, Limoges dissolved.
- 1793 – Population: 20,864.
- 1787 - Royal Limoges A porcelain factory created.
- 1806 – Cimetière de Louyat (cemetery) established.
- 1838 – Pont Neuf (Limoges) (bridge) built.
- 1841 – Population: 29,870.
- 1845 – Limousin Archaeological and Historical Society founded.
- 1846 – Population: 38,119.
- 1851 – Courrier du Centre newspaper begins publication.
- 1858 – Limoges Chamber of Commerce established.
- 1861 – Population: 51,053.
- 1864 – Fire.^{(fr)}
- 1876 – Population: 59,011.
- 1883 – Hôtel de Ville built.
- 1886 – Population: 68,477.
- 1888 – Limoges Cathedral construction completed.
- 1891 – Société des archives historiques du Limousin founded.

== 20th century ==
- 1905
  - Limoges strikes of 1905 take place.
  - Le Populaire du Centre newspaper begins publication.
- 1906 - Population: 75,906.
- 1911 – Population: 92,181.
- 1929 – Gare de Limoges-Bénédictins rebuilt.
- 1933 – Airfield in use.
- 1943
  - Trolleybus begins operating.
  - L'Écho du Centre newspaper begins publication.
- 1946 – Population: 107,857.
- 1956 – Louis Longequeue becomes mayor.
- 1958 – Botanical garden created.
- 1968 – University of Limoges established.
- 1970
  - 1970 Tour de France cycling race departs from Limoges.
  - Renaissance du vieux Limoges (historic preservation group) founded.
- 1972 – Limoges – Bellegarde Airport built.
- 1984 – Festival des francophonies en Limousin established.
- 1990 – Alain Rodet becomes mayor.
- 1993 – Aquarium du Limousin opens on Boulevard Gambetta (Limoges).
- 1998 – French multimedia library, Limoges established.
- 1999
  - TER Limousin train begins operating.
  - Population: 133,968.

== 21st century ==
- 2001 – Limoges-Métropole established.
- 2007 – Limoges Concert Hall opens.
- 2012 – Population: 136,221.
- 2014
  - March: Limoges municipal election, 2014 held.
  - Emile-Roger Lombertie becomes mayor.
- 2016 – Limoges becomes part of the Nouvelle-Aquitaine region.

== See also ==
- Limoges history
- History of Limoges
- List of mayors of Limoges
- List of heritage sites in Limoges
- History of Haute-Vienne

Other cities in the Nouvelle-Aquitaine region:

- Timeline of Bordeaux
- Timeline of La Rochelle
- Timeline of Poitiers

== Bibliography ==
=== in English ===
- Clement Cruttwell (1793). "Limoges". Gazetteer of France. London: G.G.J. and J. Robinson. hdl:2027/njp.32101072026816.
- "Limoges", Handbook for Travellers in France, London: John Murray, 1861
- "Limoges" . Encyclopædia Britannica. Vol. 16 (11th ed.). 1910. pp. 699–700.
- "Limoges", Southern France (6th ed.), Leipzig: Baedeker, 1914
- Daniel C. Haskell, ed. (1922), "Provencal literature and language, including the local history of southern France", Bulletin of the New York Public Library, vol. 26, hdl:2027/mdp.39015035117657, "Local history: Limoges"
- John M. Merriman (1985). The Red City: Limoges and the French Nineteenth Century. Oxford University Press. ISBN 978-0-19-536518-4.
- Colum Hourihane, ed. (2012). "Limoges". Grove Encyclopedia of Medieval Art and Architecture. Oxford University Press. ISBN 978-0-19-539536-5.

=== in French ===
- J.J. Juge (1817). Changemens survenus dans les moeurs des habitans de Limoges, depuis une cinquantaine d'années (in French) (2nd ed.). J.B. Bargeas.
- Jean-Baptiste-Joseph Champagnac [in French] (1839). "Limoges". Manuel des dates, en forme de dictionnaire (in French). Perisse frères.
- Eusèbe Girault de Saint-Fargeau [in French] (1850). "Limoges". Guide pittoresque: portatif et complet, du voyageur en France (in French) (3rd ed.). Paris: Firmin Didot frères. p. 674. hdl:2027/uiug.30112081968700.
- Célestin Port (1867). "Limoges". De Paris a Agen. Guides Joanne (in French). Hachette.
- Paul Ducourtieux (1884). Limoges d'après ses anciens plans (in French). V. Ducourtieux.
- Alfred Leroux [in French] (1895). Les sources de l'histoire du Limousin (Creuse, Haute-Vienne, Corrèze) (in French). Limoges: Ducourtieux. (coverage includes Limoges)
- Ulysse Chevalier (1900). "Limoges". Répertoire des sources historiques du moyen âge (in French). Vol. 2. Montbéliard: Société anonyme d'imprimerie Montbéliardaise. hdl:2027/uiuo.ark:/13960/t49p43r5m.
- Ch. Brossard (1903). "Limousin: Haute-Vienne: Description des villes: Limoges". La France du Sud-Ouest. Géographie pittoresque et monumentale de la France (in French). Flammarion. hdl:2027/nyp.33433066581137. (Table of contents)
