= Natural Product Research =

- Discipline: Natural products
- Language: English
- Edited by: Armandodoriano Bianco

Publication details
- Former name: Natural Product Letters
- Publisher: Taylor & Francis
- Frequency: Biweekly
- Impact factor: 2.488 (2021)

Standard abbreviations
- ISO 4: Nat. Prod. Res.

Indexing
- ISSN: 1478-6419 (print); 1478-6427 (web)

Links
- Journal homepage

Natural Product Research is a peer-reviewed scientific journal covering research on natural products chemistry. It was established in 1992 by Atta-ur-Rahman.

== Abstracting and indexing ==
The journal is abstracted and indexed in

- CAB Abstracts
- Cambridge Crystallographic Data Centre
- Chemical Abstracts Service
- National Library of Medicine
- PubMed
- Science Citation Index Expanded
- Scopus.
