= Bordeaux Congress =

The Bordeaux Congress was the fifteenth national congress of the French Socialist Party (Parti socialiste or PS). It took place from 10 to 12 July 1992.

== Results ==
No motions vote was held. The directional text proposed by the leadership won 85.30% of the votes.

Laurent Fabius was re-elected as First Secretary.
