= Eleutherobin =

Names
- IUPAC name [(1S,2S,4R,8R,9S,10Z,12R)-11-[[(2R,3S,4R,5R)-3-acetyloxy-4,5-dihydroxyoxan-2-yl]oxymethyl]-12-methoxy-1,5-dimethyl-8-propan-2-yl-15-oxatricyclo[10.2.1.0^{4,9}]pentadeca-5,10,13-trien-2-yl] (E)-3-(1-methylimidazol-4-yl)prop-2-enoate

Identifiers
| CAS Number | 174545-76-7 |
| 3D model (JSmol) | Interactive image |
| ChEMBL | ChEMBL504387 |
| ChemSpider | 5293539 |
| PubChem CID | 6918335 |
| UNII | LEW3MBQ5WM |
| CompTox Dashboard (EPA) | DTXSID20893496 |
- InChI: InChI=1S/C35H48N2O10/c1-20(2)25-10-8-21(3)26-15-29(46-30(40)11-9-24-16-37(6)19-36-24)34(5)12-13-35(42-7,47-34)23(14-27(25)26)17-43-33-32(45-22(4)38)31(41)28(39)18-44-33/h8-9,11-14,16,19-20,25-29,31-33,39,41H,10,15,17-18H2,1-7H3/b11-9+,23-14-/t25-,26+,27-,28-,29+,31-,32+,33-,34+,35-/m1/s1 Key: XOPYFXBZMVTEJF-PDACKIITSA-N; InChI=1/C35H48N2O10/c1-20(2)25-10-8-21(3)26-15-29(46-30(40)11-9-24-16-37(6)19-36-24)34(5)12-13-35(42-7,47-34)23(14-27(25)26)17-43-33-32(45-22(4)38)31(41)28(39)18-44-33/h8-9,11-14,16,19-20,25-29,31-33,39,41H,10,15,17-18H2,1-7H3/b11-9+,23-14-/t25-,26+,27-,28-,29+,31-,32+,33-,34+,35-/m1/s1 Key: XOPYFXBZMVTEJF-PDACKIITBR
- SMILES: CC1=CC[C@@H]([C@@H]/2[C@H]1C[C@@H]([C@@]3(C=C[C@@](O3)(/C(=C2)/CO[C@H]4[C@H]([C@@H]([C@@H](CO4)O)O)OC(=O)C)OC)C)OC(=O)/C=C/C5=CN(C=N5)C)C(C)C

Properties
| Chemical formula | C_{35}H_{48}N_{2}O_{10} |
| Molar mass | 656.773 g·mol^{−1} |
- Except where otherwise noted, data are given for materials in their standard state (at 25 °C [77 °F], 100 kPa). Infobox references

Eleutherobin is a marine diterpene glycoside with in vitro anticancer activity.
