= Les Minimes =

Biggest Atlantic Marina, La Rochelle, France

Coordinates: 46°8′40″N 1°10′0″W

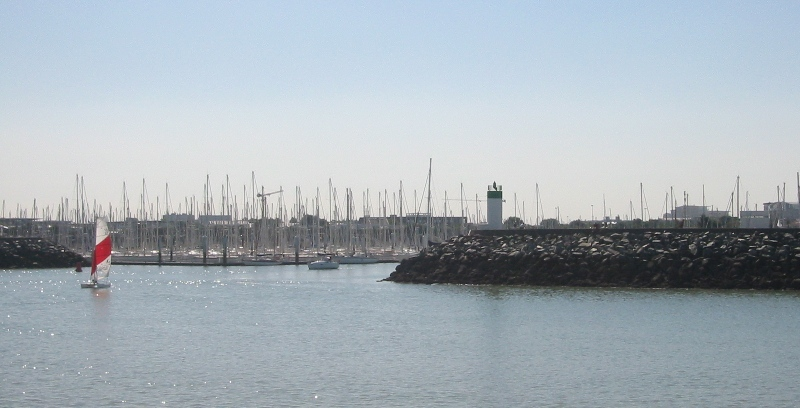
Entrance to Les Minimes harbour.

Les Minimes, Port de plaisance des Minimes, is the largest marina in France for pleasure boats. It is located in the city of La Rochelle, as the new part, with a university campus, shops, restaurants and a cinema.

== History ==
Its name is derived from the establishment of a convent of the Frères Minimes ("Order of the Minimes Brothers") in this area during the Middle Ages. Today, the whole area has undergone an urban development, with the construction of many residential buildings, universities, shops, and restaurants. There are over 10,000 students in Les Minimes, with campuses for Excelia Group school established in 1988, and La Rochelle University which was first opened in 1974, but became a university in 1993.

== Marina ==
There are slips for about 4,700 permanent boats, and for 400 visitors.

The marina offers sailing access to the protected Pertuis d'Antioche and its surrounding islands, such as Île de Ré, Île d'Aix and Île d'Oléron. It is considered the leading marina in Atlantic Europe, and one of the best in the world.

The Grand Pavois is a yearly floating nautical show in the marina since 1973. The marina also hosts 120 other yearly events, regattas and nautical competitions, working in collaboration with the French Sailing Federation.

== Les Minimes gallery ==
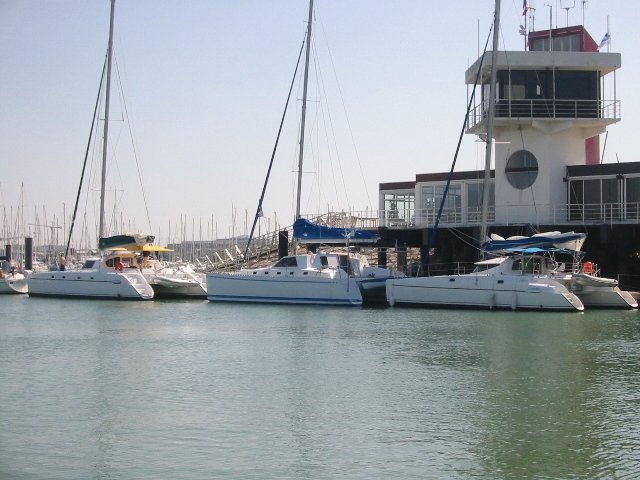
Catamarans docked at Les Minimes marina

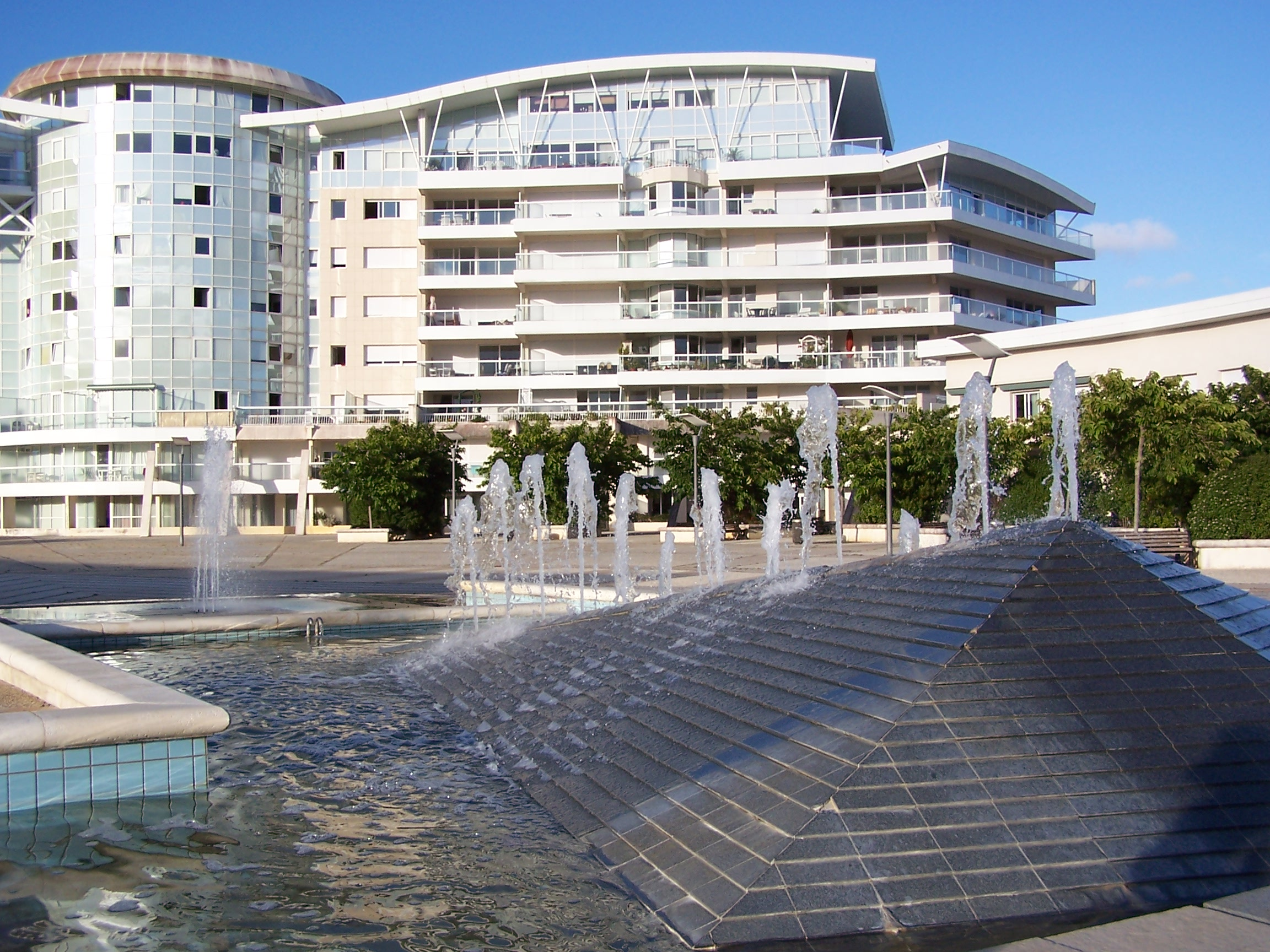
The "Porte Océane", an upscale urban development in Les Minimes

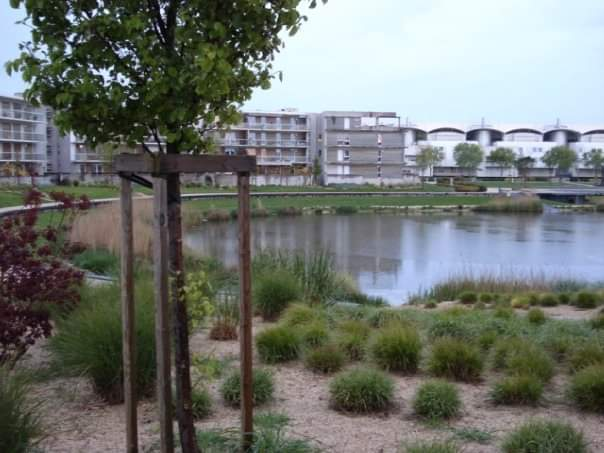
Promenade Helen and Victor Basch, Les Minimes student village

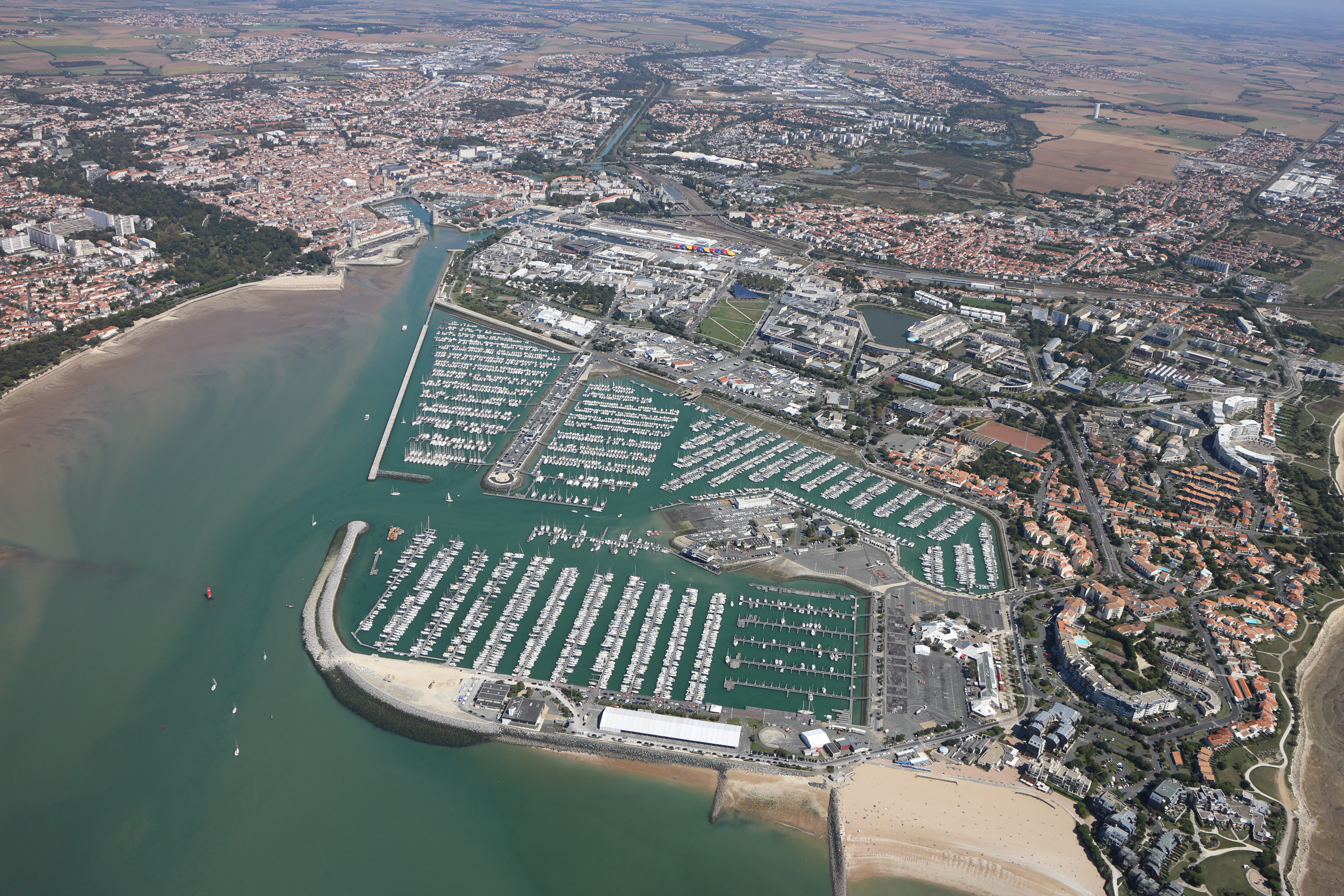
Aerial view of Les Minimes, La Rochelle

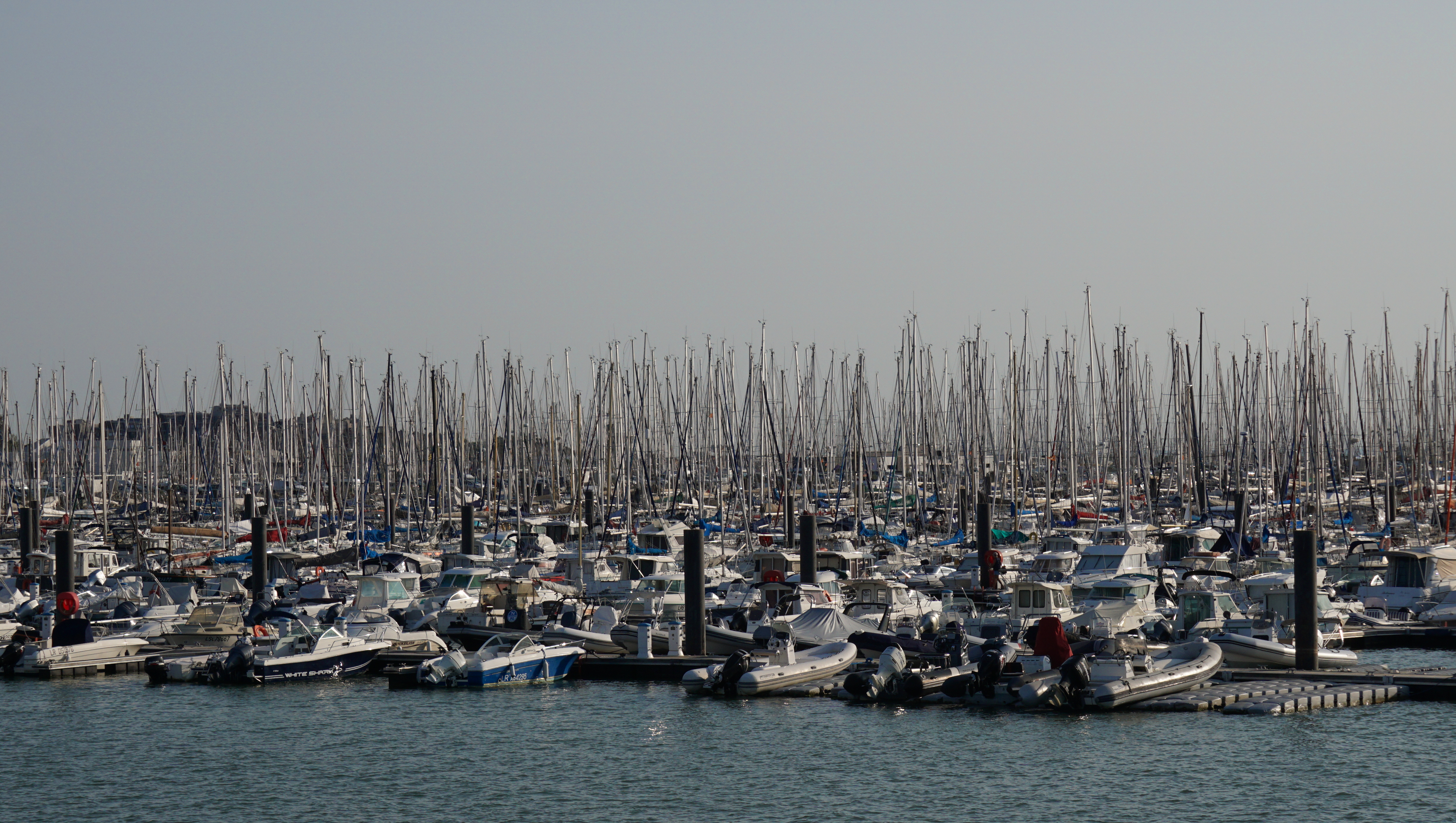
Les Minimes marina full of boats
