= Aquarium de La Rochelle =

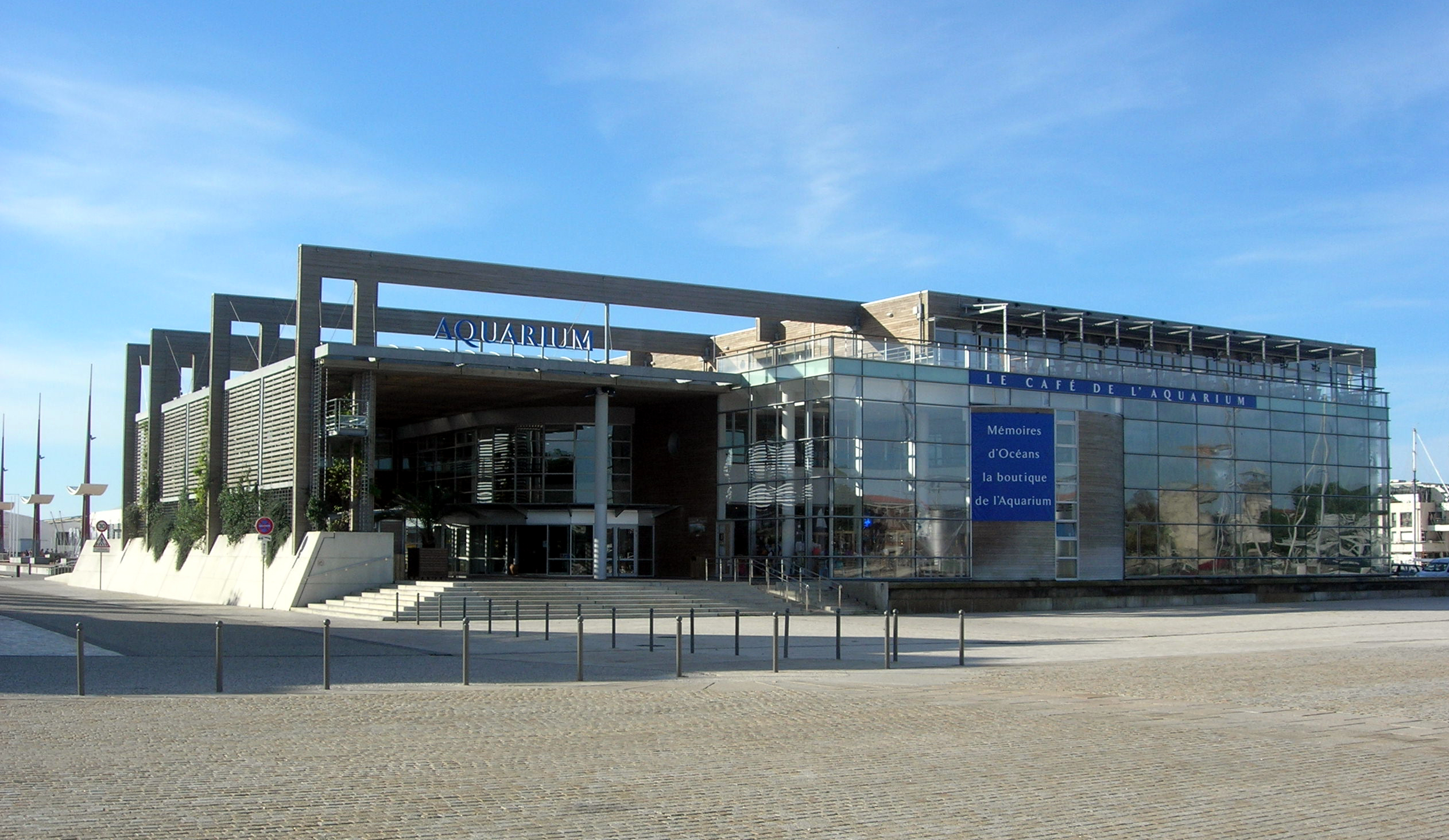
- Interactive map of Aquarium de La Rochelle
- 46.1533°N 1.1505°W
- Date opened: 1988
- Location: La Rochelle, France
- Floor space: 8,445 m^{2} (90,900 ft^{2})
- No. of animals: 12,000
- No. of species: 600
- Total volume of tanks: 3 million litres (660,000 imp gal; 790,000 US gal)
- Annual visitors: 800,000
- Website: www.aquarium-larochelle.com

Aquarium de La Rochelle is a family-owned public aquarium in La Rochelle, France. It has a surface area of over 8,445 m^{2} (90,901 sq ft) with 3 million litres of seawater. It has 73 display aquaria and 150 quarantine aquaria exhibiting more than 12,000 animals of 600 different species. It has an average of 800,000 visitors per year.

== History ==
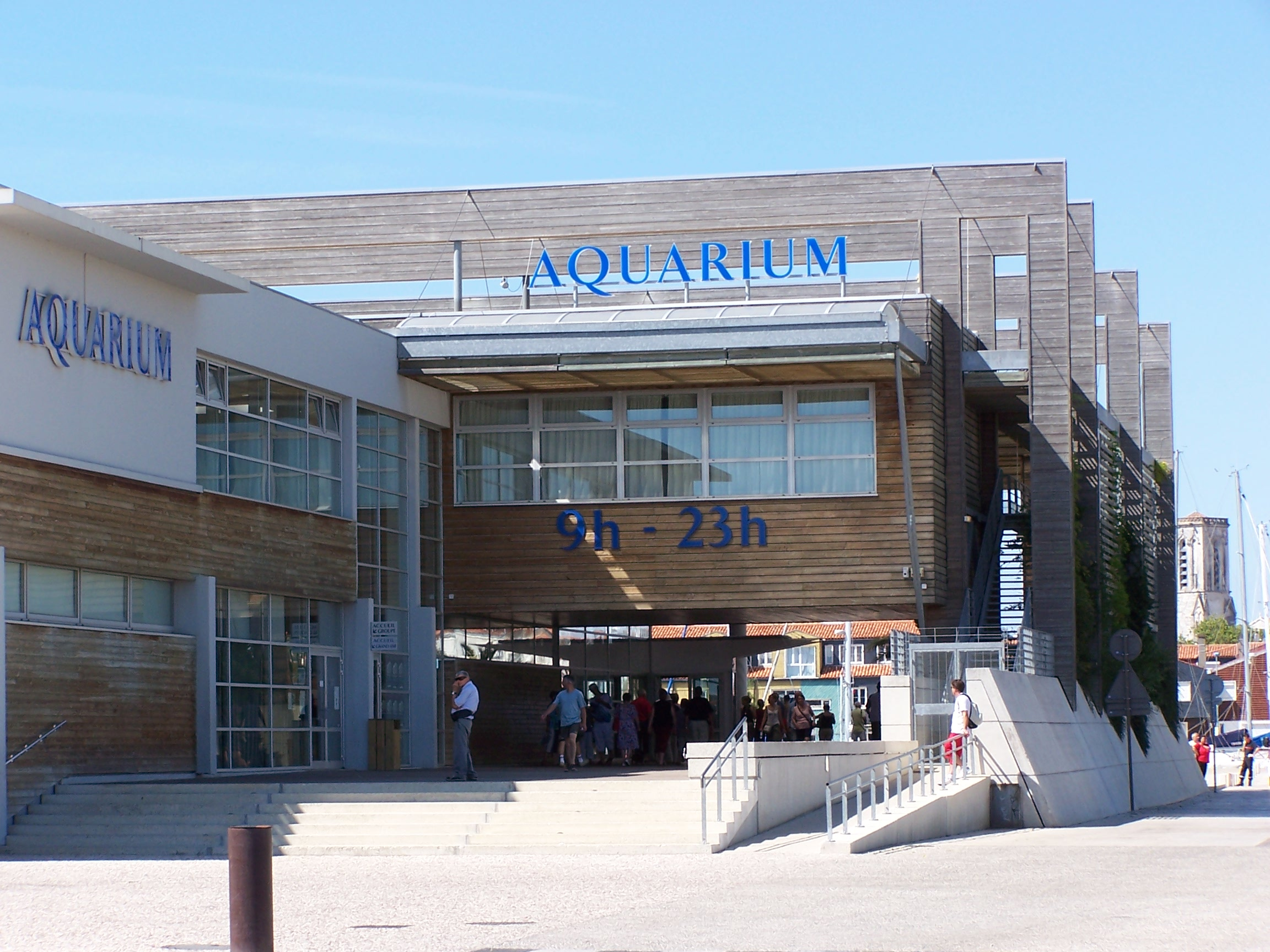
Aquarium de La Rochelle - Entrance

In 1988, during the second international aquarium congress in Monaco, the opening of the Aquarium La Rochelle was announced as being one of the biggest French aquaria at the time. The aquarium, then located near the marina of Les Minimes, was over 1,600 m^{2} (17,222 sq ft) with 36 aquaria whose volume total was 550,000 litres. Within 12 years, the building welcomed seven million visitors.

The aquarium moved due to this success, and a new one was inaugurated near the Vieux-Port, in the middle of the city of La Rochelle, in 2001. With a surface area of over 8,445 m^{2} (90,901 sq ft), it is part of the biggest European public aquariums. It exhibits more than 12,000 animals of 600 different species which are split into 3 million liters of seawater, including 1.5 million liters for the sharks area.

The Aquarium de La Rochelle has become the 1st tourist attraction of the department Charente-Maritime (before La Palmyre Zoo), the 2nd one of the region Poitou-Charente, and the 6th overall in France.

== Tours ==
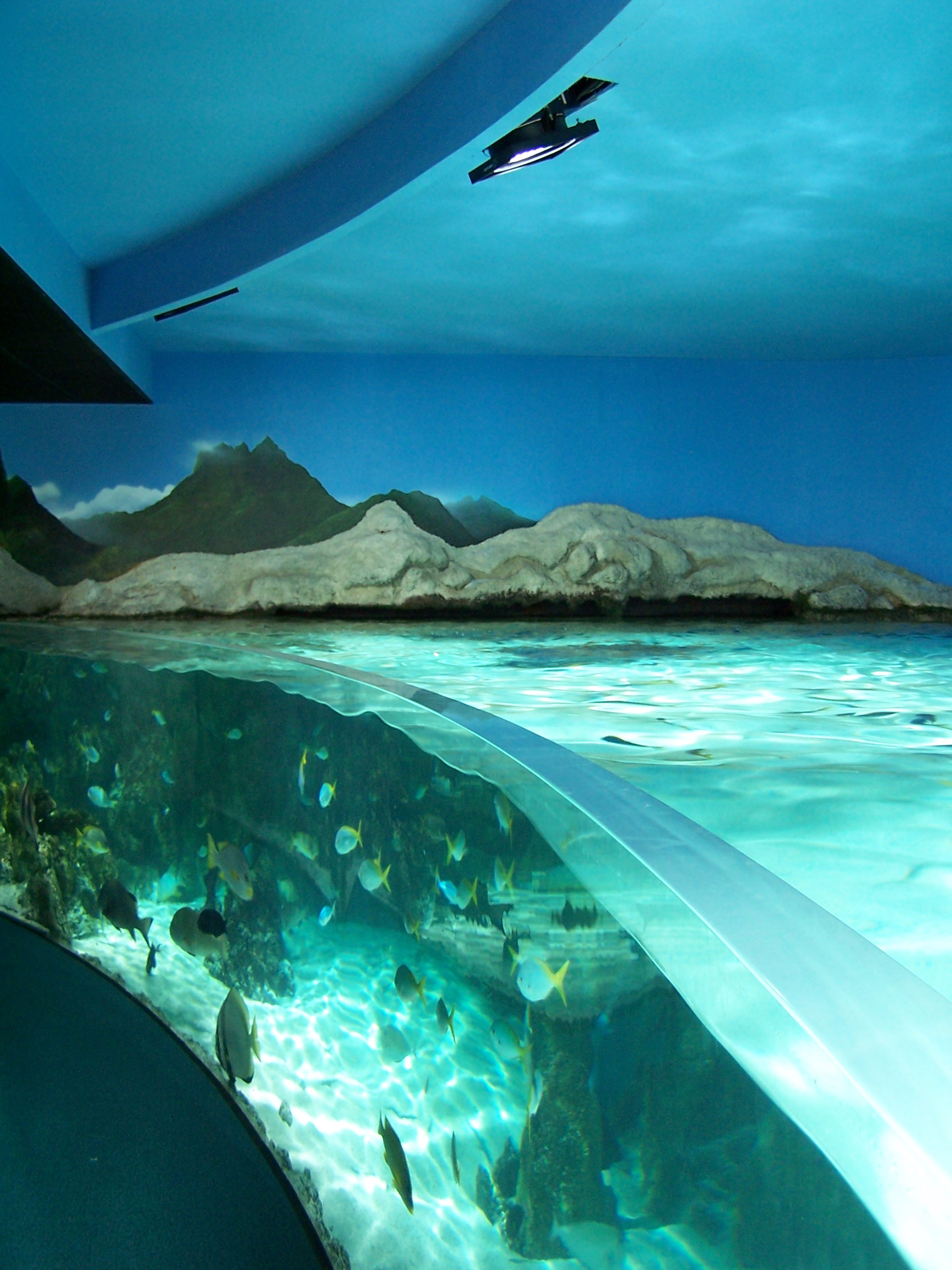
An aquarium in the Aquarium de La Rochelle

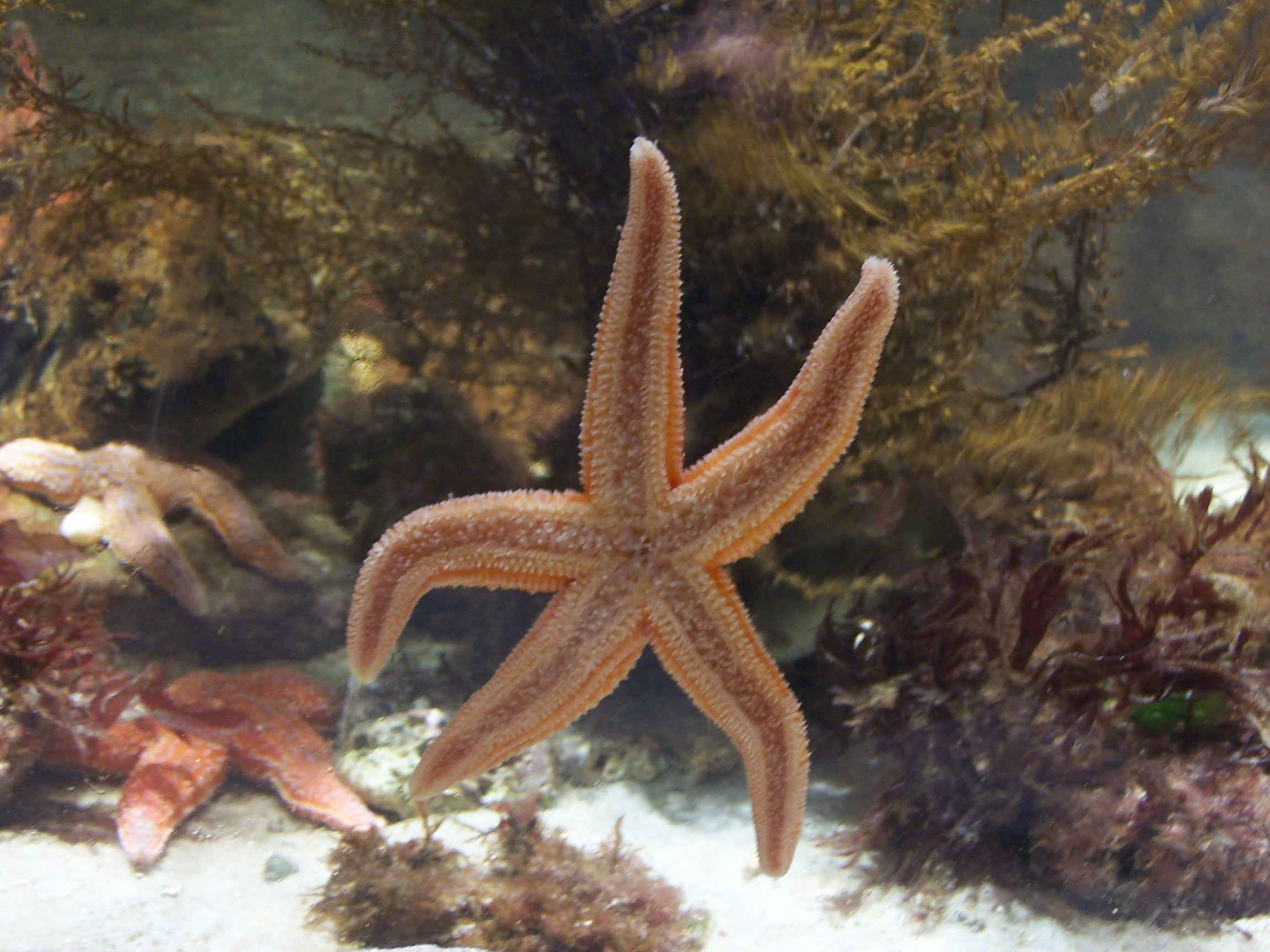
Asteria rubens from Aquarium de La Rochelle

=== The different rooms ===
The aquarium is open every day of the year. The tour requires at least two hours of visiting. The tour is made for families since observation points at children's heights are provided, as well as audio guides. To access to the rooms, visitors are invited to take elevators, so that they feel like they are going deep inside the ocean.

==== Atlantic room ====
19 aquariums display local species of Charente-Maritime coasts and of the intertidal zone.

==== Mediterranean room ====
Composed of 12 aquariums, this room displays fishes, invertebrates and corals of Mediterranean Sea.

==== Oceanic area ====
A huge aquarium displays fauna living off the coasts of Africa.

==== Jellyfish area ====
This room is dedicated to jellyfishes from tropical and temperate waters. Two tube-shaped aquariums allow visitors admire plankton.

==== Caribbean room ====
5 aquariums are dedicated to species living in the Caribbean. In a huge terrarium, a recreated mangrove can be observed.

==== Indo-Pacific room ====
21 aquariums, including a giant one of 100 000 litres, display different species of fishes, invertebrates and corals living in the Great Barrier Reef and in the Hawaiian and Red Sea archipelagos. Three aquariums plunged into total darkness allow visitors observe life of the night-time reef: bioluminescence, fluorescence and light absorption.

==== Sharks area ====
Different species of sharks can be observed from tiers.

==== Amphitheatre aquarium ====
This aquarium of 150 000 litres displays surgeon fishes and giant trevally fishes evolving among moray eels, a green turtle and a scale turtle which weights 60 kg. (132.3 lb)

==== Tropical greenhouse ====
Composed of the aquarium and a turtle river, the greenhouse allow visitors admire varied fauna and flora.

== Research and educational activities ==
=== Educational activities ===
13,500 primary and secondary pupils on average are greeted for educational activities every year and 25 activities are proposed. A room for practical activities, a room for activities and an amphitheatre of 50 seats are available.

=== Care and studies centre for sea turtles ===
The care and studies centre for sea turtles (CESTM in French) takes charge of sea turtles washed up from the Atlantic arc to the Opal Coast to take care of them and release them once they recovered. A 112 turtles were healed and released from 2000 to 2011. The C.E.S.T.M's purpose is to help to preserve those species by leading scientific research, which tends to understand better their behaviour and thus contribute to their protection. The Ministry of Ecology, Sustainable Development and Energy supports the centre.

Since 2008, the centre has been setting up a program of satellite monitoring of young Loggerhead sea turtles in real time by implanting an electronic chip in a flipper before releasing them. This program allows studying their moving in the Gascony gulf. The Aquarium of La Rochelle works on this project in partnership with Oceanopolis in Brest.

=== Marine Species Conservation and Studies Centre ===
The Aquarium of La Rochelle reproduces about twenty marine species and grows different type of corals in 150 quarantine aquariums, which thus avoids samples in natural environment.
