= Acetate pathway =

Schematic diagram of the acetate biosynthetic pathway

The acetate pathway, also known as the polyketide pathway, is a fundamental biosynthetic route in organisms for the production of fatty acids and polyketides. This pathway operates at the interface of central metabolism and specialized metabolite synthesis, playing a crucial role in the synthesis of both primary and secondary metabolites.

It begins with acetyl-CoA and involves the stepwise condensation of two-carbon units, typically derived from malonyl-CoA, to form increasingly longer carbon chains. In fatty acid synthesis, these chains are fully reduced after each elongation step, while in polyketide synthesis, the reduction steps may be partially or completely omitted, leading to a diverse array of complex natural products. The acetate pathway is essential for the biosynthesis of vital cellular components such as membrane lipids, as well as a wide range of bioactive secondary metabolites, including many pharmaceutically important compounds.
