= Blossac Park =

Historic garden and park in Poitiers, France

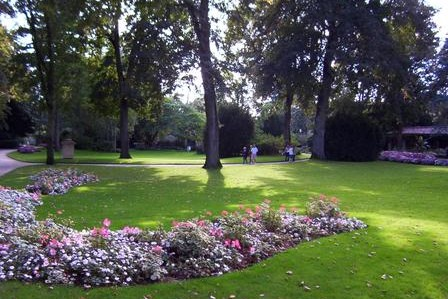
- The Blossac Park in 2005
- Interactive map of Blossac Park
- Type: Municipal
- Location: Poitiers, France
- Coordinates: 46.5746°N 0.3330°E
- Created: 18th century

The Blossac Park (French: Parc de Blossac) is a historic private garden, now a public park, in Poitiers, France. It was established by Paul Esprit Marie de La Bourdonnaye, Count of Blossac, in the 18th century. It is the largest park in Poitiers.
