= Montmirail =

Montmirail may refer to:

== Places ==
- Dentelles de Montmirail, a small chain of mountains in the Vaucluse department, southern France
- Montmirail, Marne, in the Marne department, France
  - Battle of Montmirail, a battle fought in 1814 during the Six Days' Campaign of the Napoleonic Wars
  - Château de Montmirail (Marne), on the list of châteaux in Champagne-Ardenne
- Montmirail, Sarthe, in the Sarthe department, France
  - Château de Montmirail (Sarthe), on the list of châteaux in the Pays-de-la-Loire
- Montmirail, Neuchâtel, a hamlet near Neuchâtel, Switzerland

== People ==
- Cécile de Montmirail (16th century), married to Antoine de La Rochefoucauld
- Jean de Montmirail (1165–1217), French nobleman who became a Cistercian monk
- Guillaume de Montmirail, French nobleman and first mayor of La Rochelle in 1199
- Renaud de Montmirail, French nobleman, member of the Fourth Crusade
- Godefroy de Montmirail, a fictional character in the French film Les Visiteurs

== Other ==
- The Battle of Montmirail, an 1822 painting by Horace Vernet
