= La Rochelle =

City in Nouvelle-Aquitaine, France

La Rochelle La Rochéle (Poitevin–Saintongeais)
- Prefecture and commune
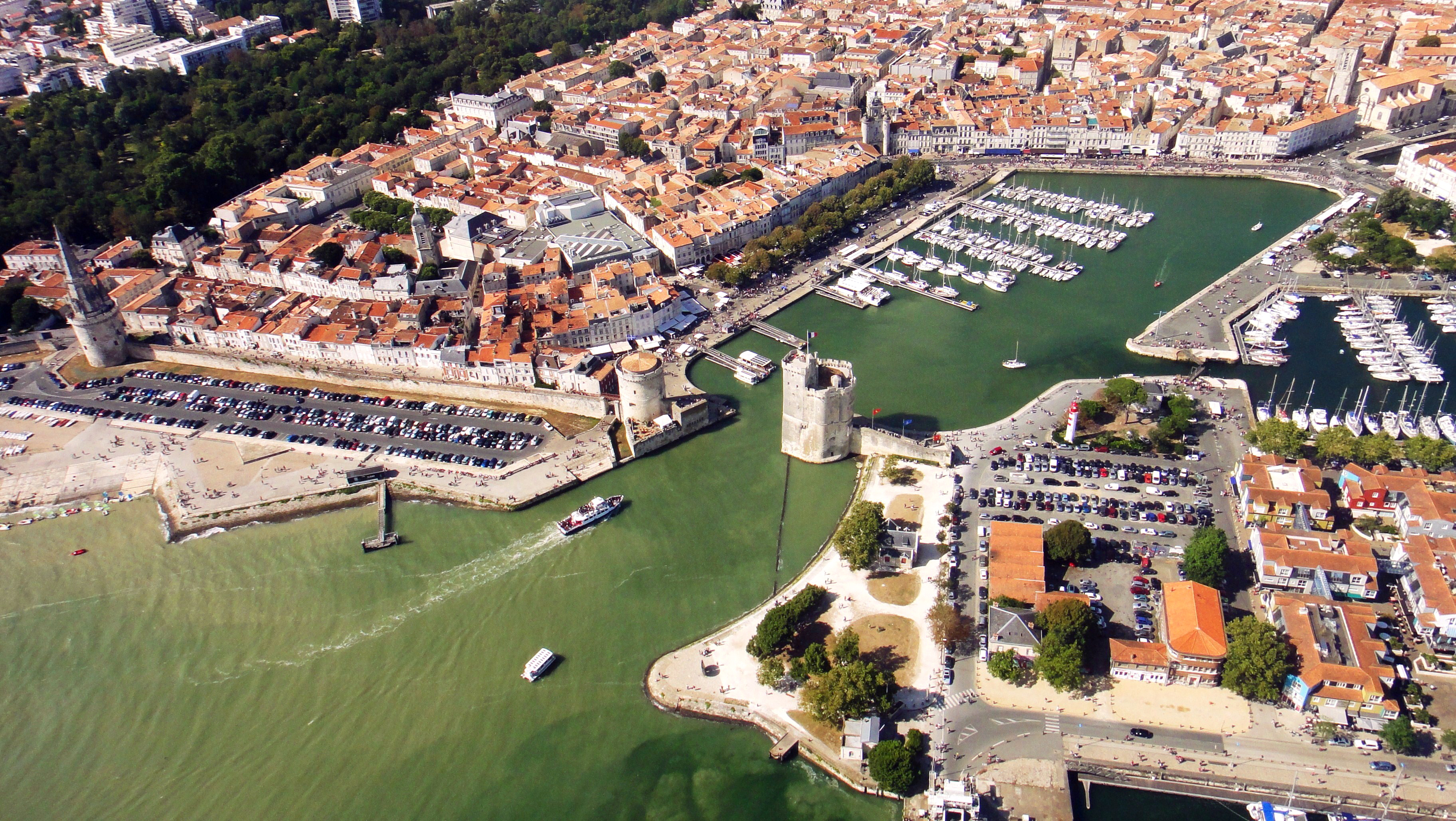
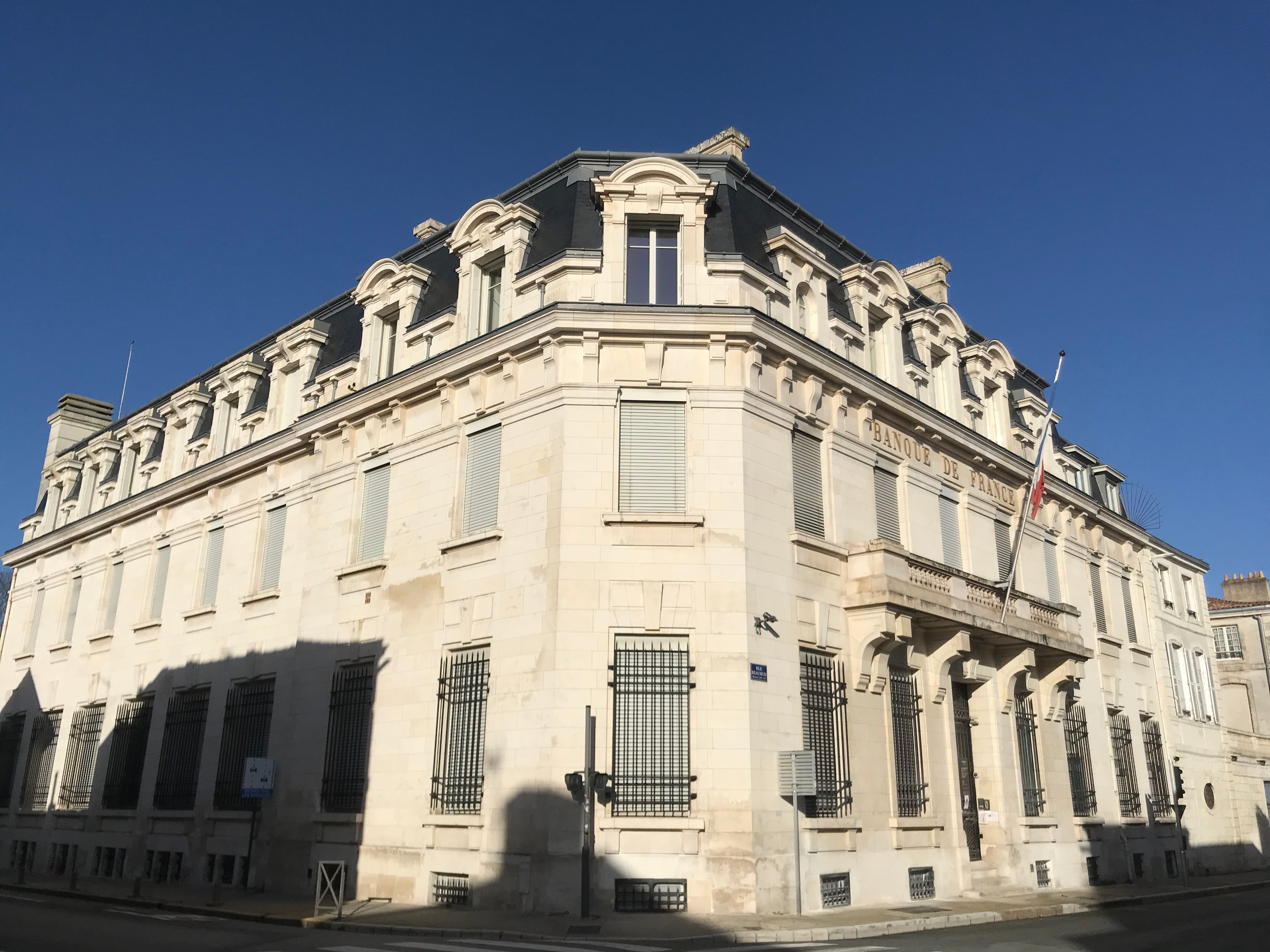
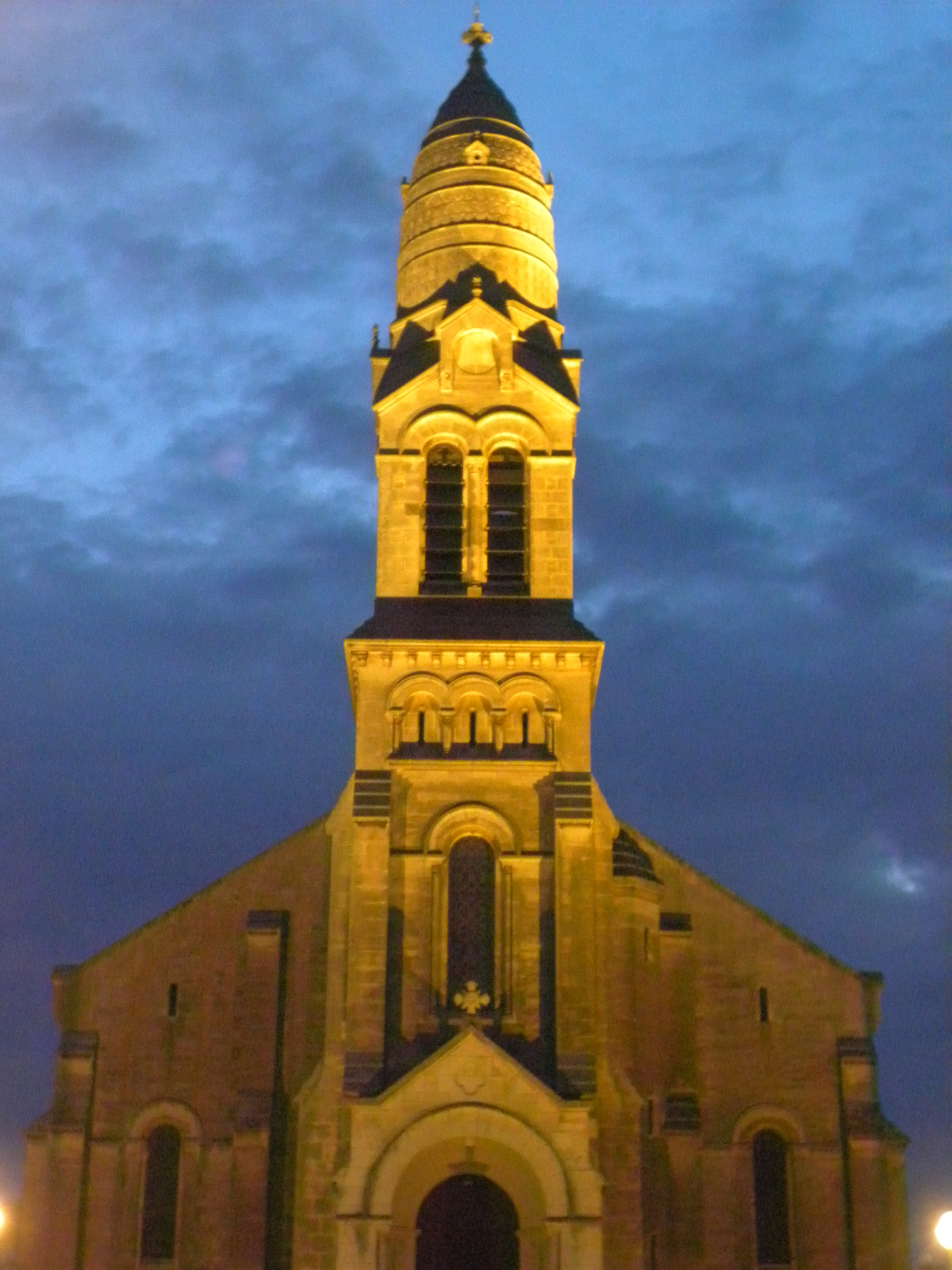
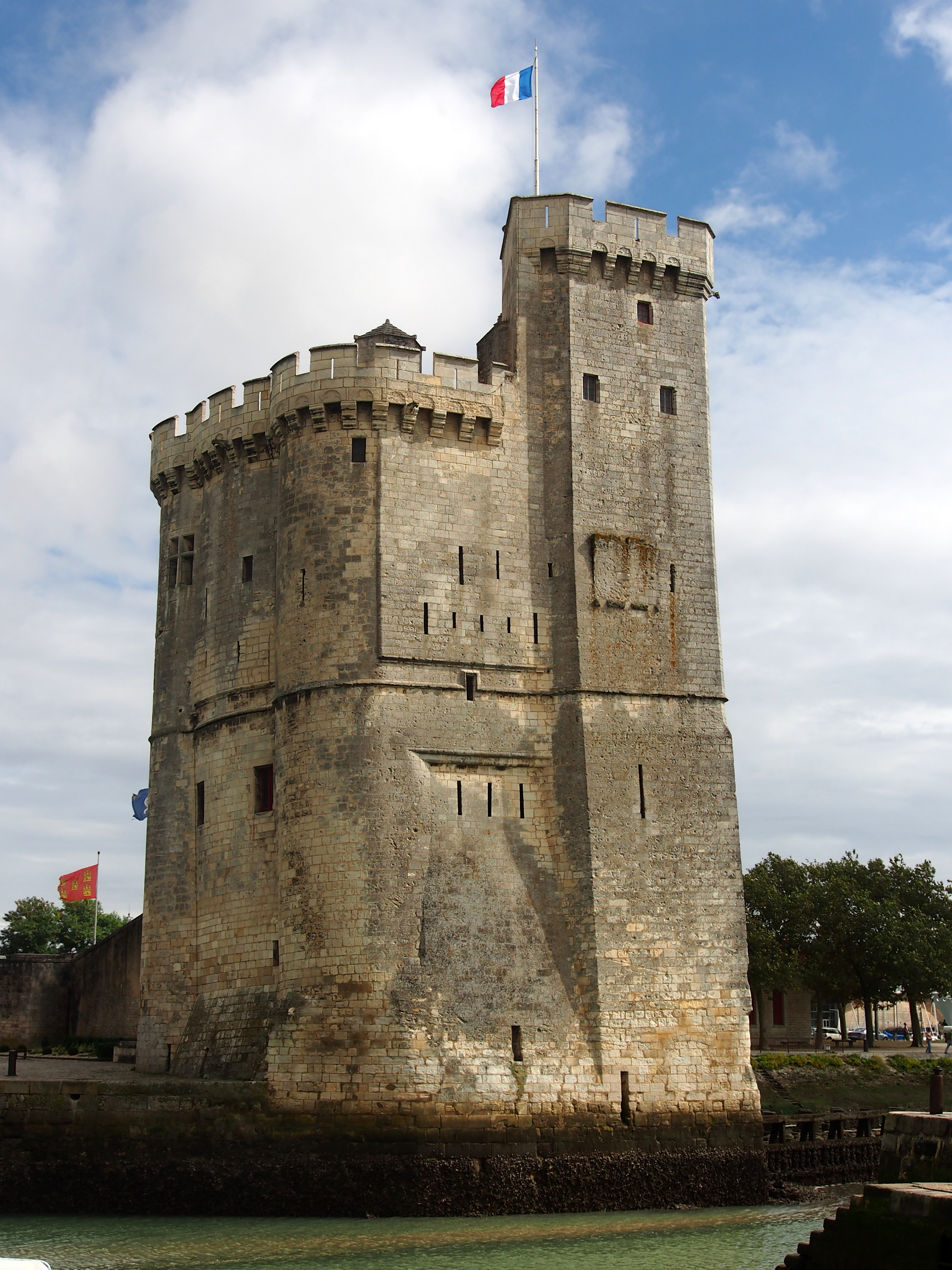
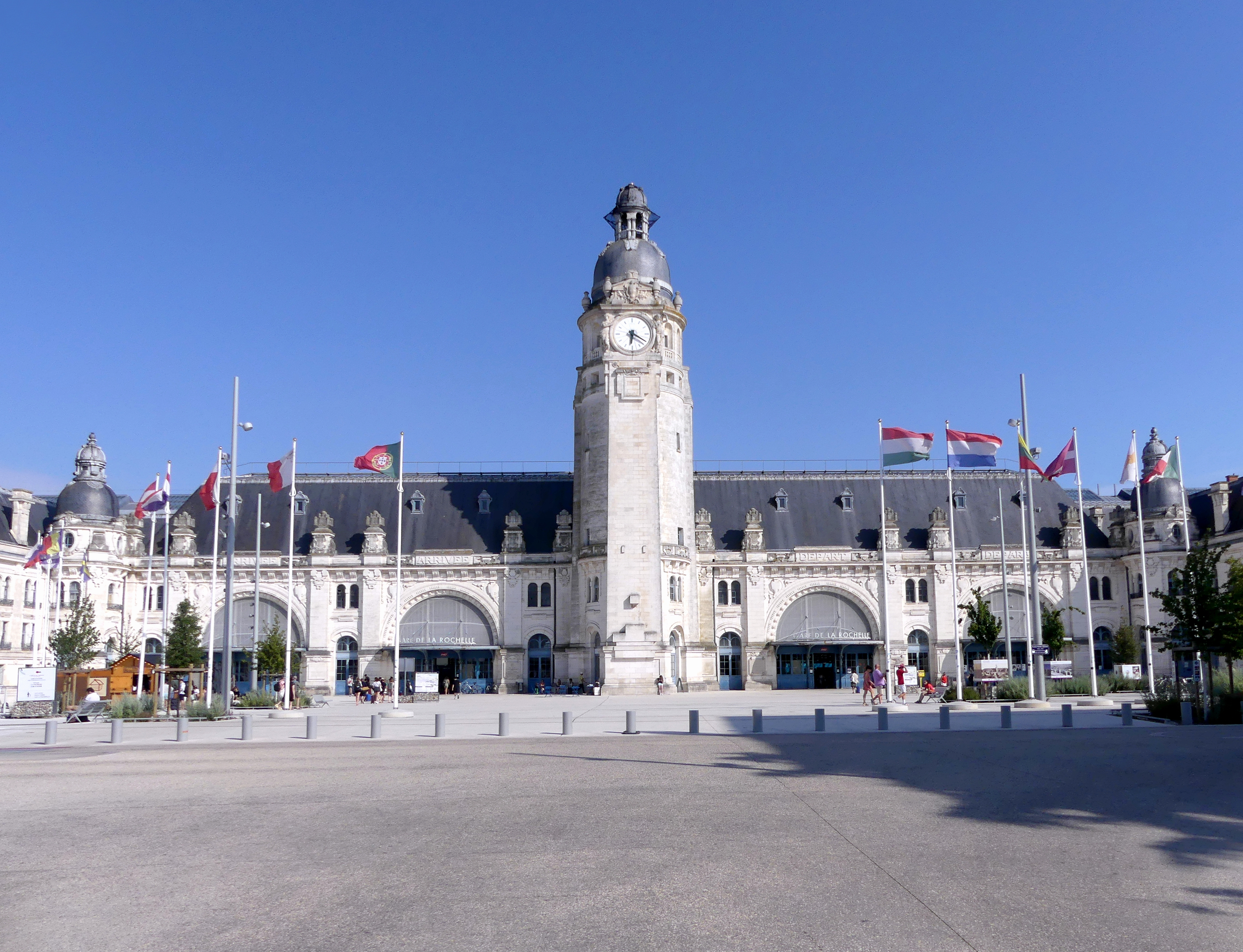
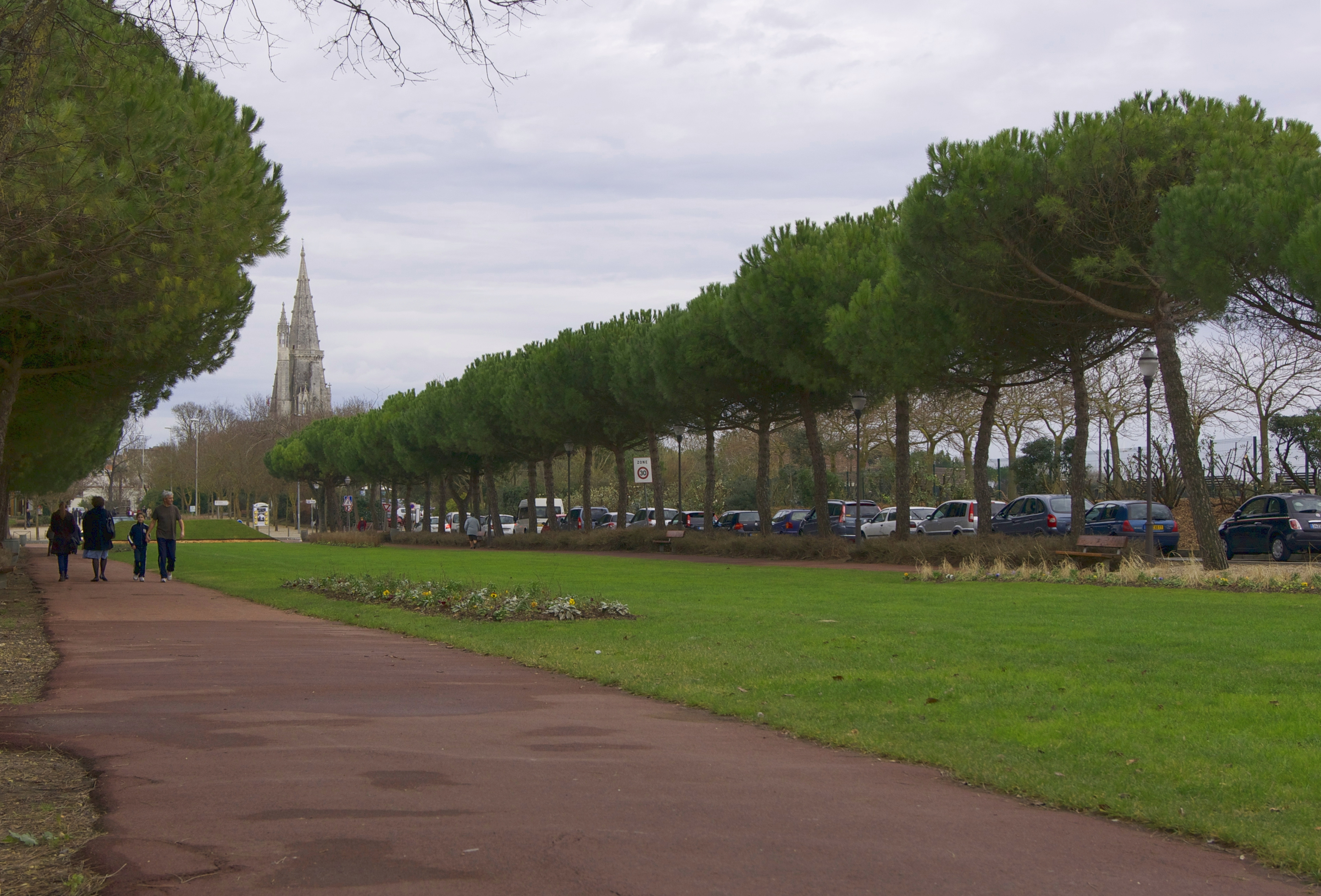
- Old harbour of La Rochelle Bank of France building Church of the Sacred Heart Saint Nicolas Tower La Rochelle-Ville station Allées du Mail with the Lantern Tower in the distance

- Coat of arms
- Location of La Rochelle
- Location within France Location within Nouvelle-Aquitaine
- Coordinates: 46.16°N 1.15°W
- Country: France
- Region: Nouvelle-Aquitaine
- Department: Charente-Maritime
- Arrondissement: La Rochelle
- Intercommunality: CA La Rochelle

Government
  - Mayor (2026–32): Olivier Falorni
- Area^{1}: 28.43 km^{2} (10.98 sq mi)
- Elevation: 4 m (13 ft)
- Highest elevation: 28 m (92 ft)
- Lowest elevation: 0 m (0 ft)
- Population (2023): 79,851
  - Density: 2,809/km^{2} (7,274/sq mi)
- Time zone: UTC+01:00 (CET)
  - Summer (DST): UTC+02:00 (CEST)
- INSEE/Postal code: 17300 /17000
- ^{1} French Land Register data, which excludes lakes, ponds, glaciers > 1 km^{2} (0.386 sq mi or 247 acres) and river estuaries.

La Rochelle (UK: /ˌlæ rɒˈʃɛl/, US: /ˌlɑː roʊˈʃɛl/, French: [la ʁɔʃɛl]; Poitevin-Saintongeais: La Rochéle) is a city on the west coast of France and a seaport on the Bay of Biscay, a part of the Atlantic Ocean. It is the capital of the Charente-Maritime department. With 78,535 inhabitants in 2021, La Rochelle is the most populated commune in the department and ranks fourth in the Nouvelle-Aquitaine region after Bordeaux, the regional capital, Limoges and Poitiers.

Situated on the edge of the Atlantic Ocean, the city is connected to the Île de Ré by a 2.9-kilometre-long (1 3/4-mile) bridge completed on 19 May 1988. Since the Middle Ages the harbour has opened onto a protected strait, the Pertuis d'Antioche, and is regarded as a "porte océane" or gateway to the ocean because of the presence of its three ports (fishing, trade and yachting). The city has a strong commercial tradition, having an active port from very early on in its history.

The city traces its origins to the Gallo-Roman period, attested by the remains of important salt marshes and villas. The Dukes of Aquitaine granted it a charter as a free port in 1130. With the opening of the English market following the second marriage of Eleanor of Aquitaine in 1152, the presence of the Knights Templar and the Knights of Saint John of Jerusalem quickly made this small town the largest port on the Atlantic.

To this day, the city still possesses a rich historical fabric, including the Saint-Nicholas tower, and an urban heritage. The capital of Aunis, it has become the most important coastal city between the Loire and Gironde estuaries. La Rochelle's urban activities are many in number and strongly differentiated, being a city with port and industrial functions that are still important, but also including a predominantly administrative and tertiary sector that is reinforced by the University of La Rochelle and a rapidly developing tourism industry. In the early 21st century, the city has consistently been ranked among France's most liveable cities. Until 2015, the town was part of the administrative region called Poitou-Charentes, prior to the delimitation of regions in France.

== History ==
=== Antiquity ===
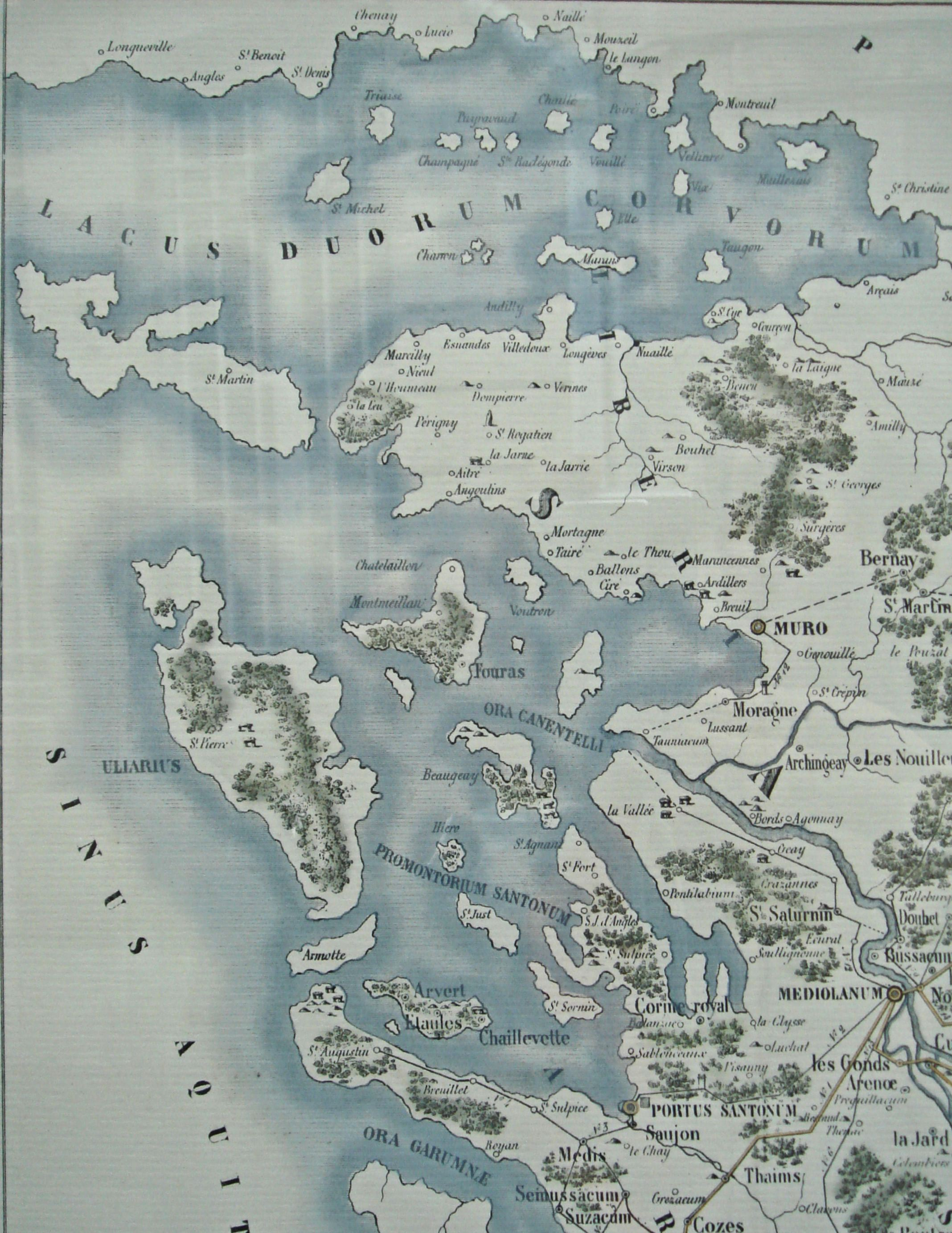
Coastline around La Rochelle in Roman times

The Romans subsequently occupied the area, where they developed salt production along the coast. Roman villas have been found at Saint-Éloi and at Les Minimes. Salt evaporation ponds dating from the same period have also been found.

=== Foundation ===
The name was first recorded in 961 as Rupella, from a Latin diminutive meaning 'little rock'. It was later known as Rocella and Roscella before the name took on its current form. The establishment of La Rochelle as a harbour was a consequence of the victory of Duke Guillaume X of Aquitaine over Isambert de Châtelaillon in 1130, and the subsequent destruction of his harbour of Châtelaillon. In 1137, Guillaume X to all intents and purposes made La Rochelle a free port and gave it the right to identify as a commune.

Fifty years later Eleanor of Aquitaine upheld the communal charter promulgated by her father. For the first time in France, a city mayor was appointed for La Rochelle, Guillaume de Montmirail. Guillaume was assisted in his responsibilities by 24 municipal magistrates, and 75 nobles who had jurisdiction over the inhabitants.

=== Plantagenet rule (1154–1224) ===
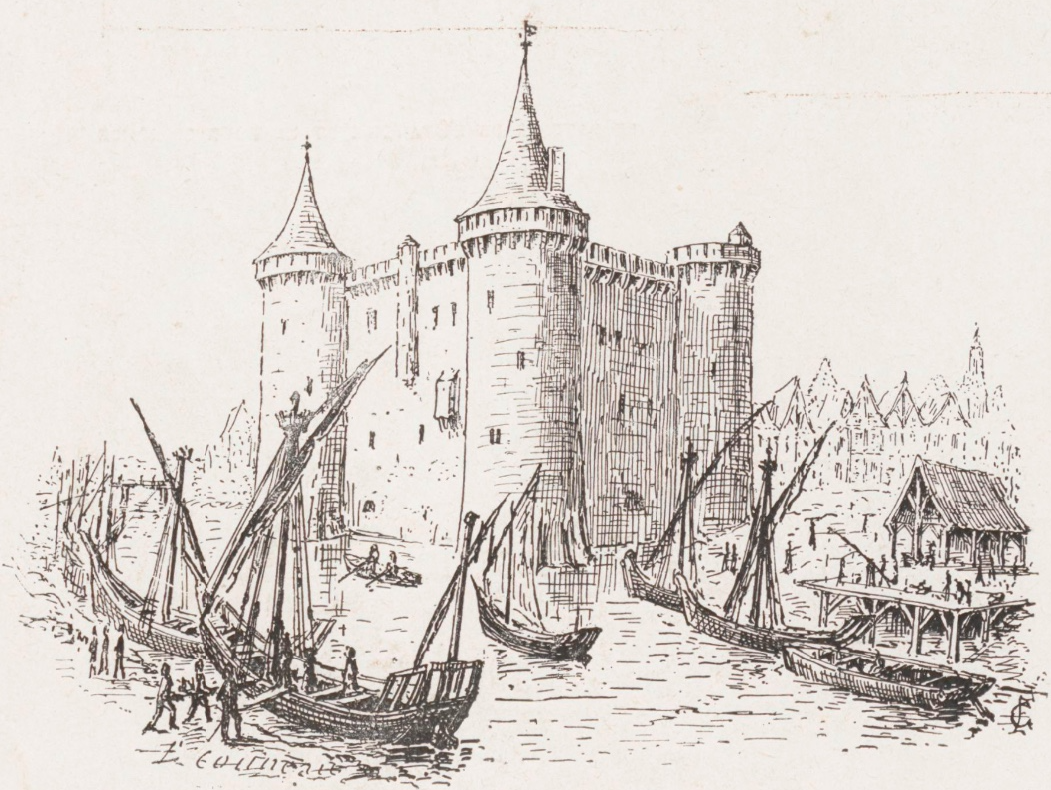
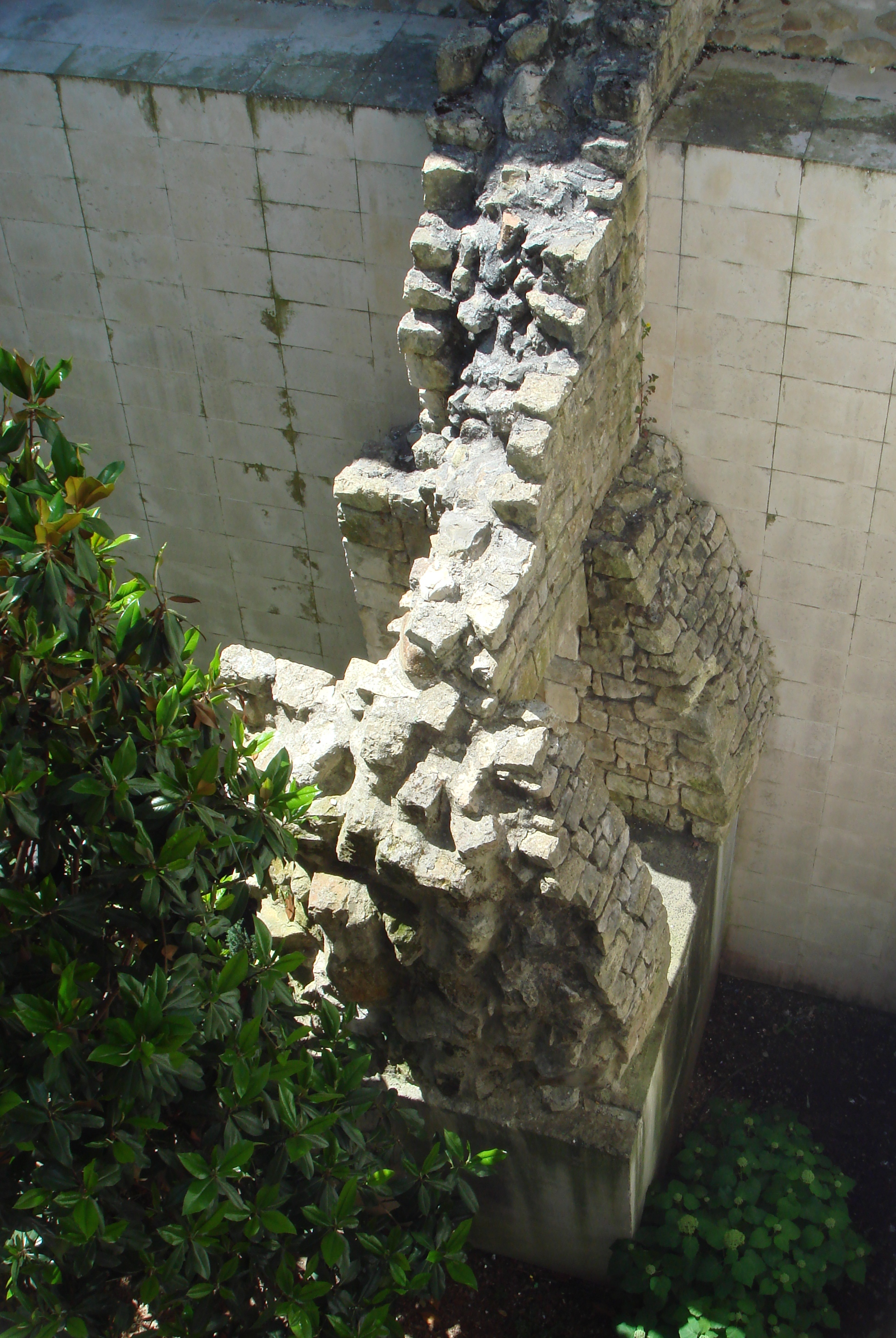
Left image: Vauclair castle was built by the English in 1185.
Right image: Remnants of Vauclair castle, Place de Verdun, La Rochelle.

Eleanor married Henry Plantagenet in 1152, who became king of England as Henry II in 1154, thus putting La Rochelle under Plantagenet rule, until Louis VIII captured it in the 1224 siege of La Rochelle. During the Plantagenet control of the city in 1185, Henry II had the Vauclair castle built, remains of which are still visible in the Place de Verdun.

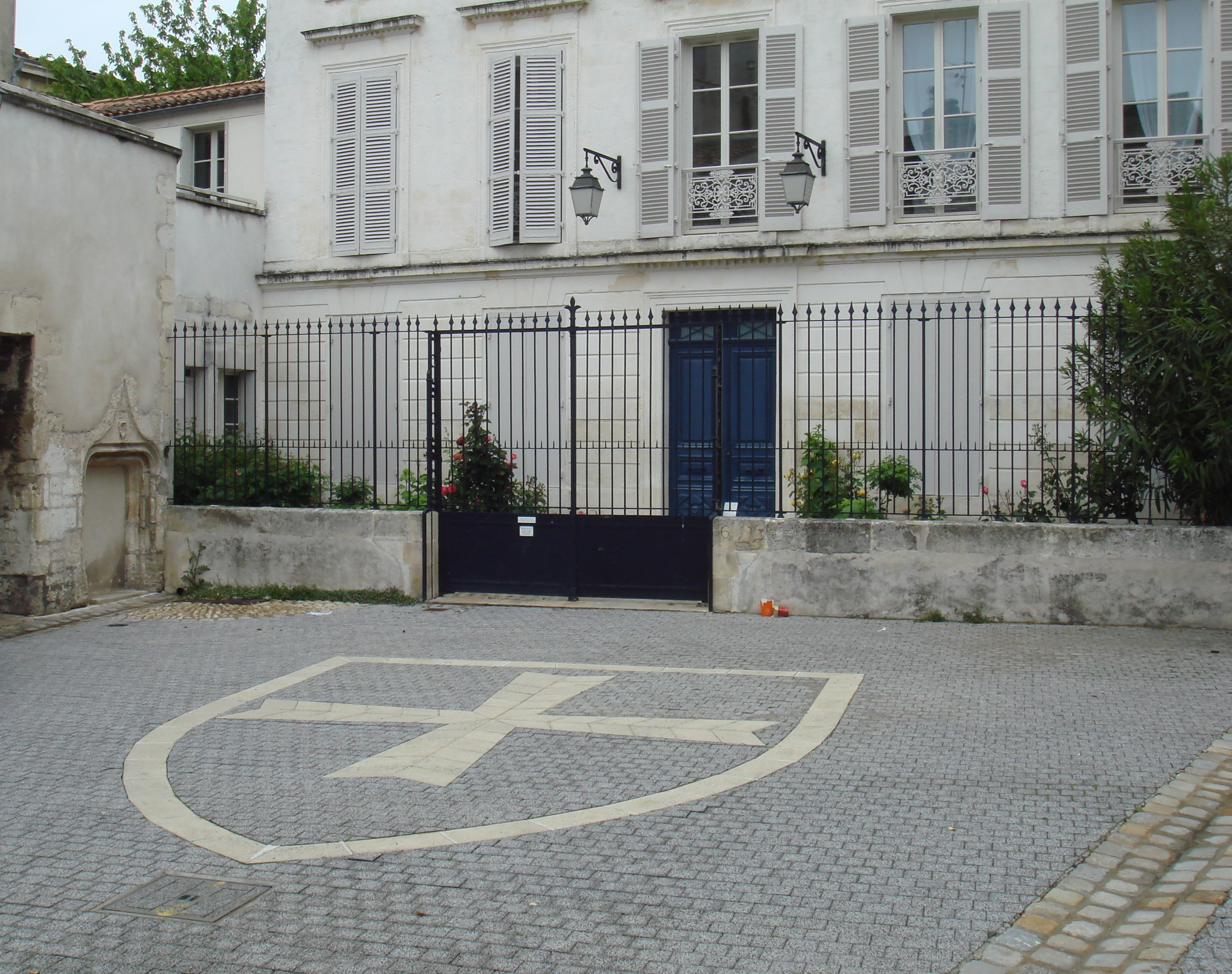
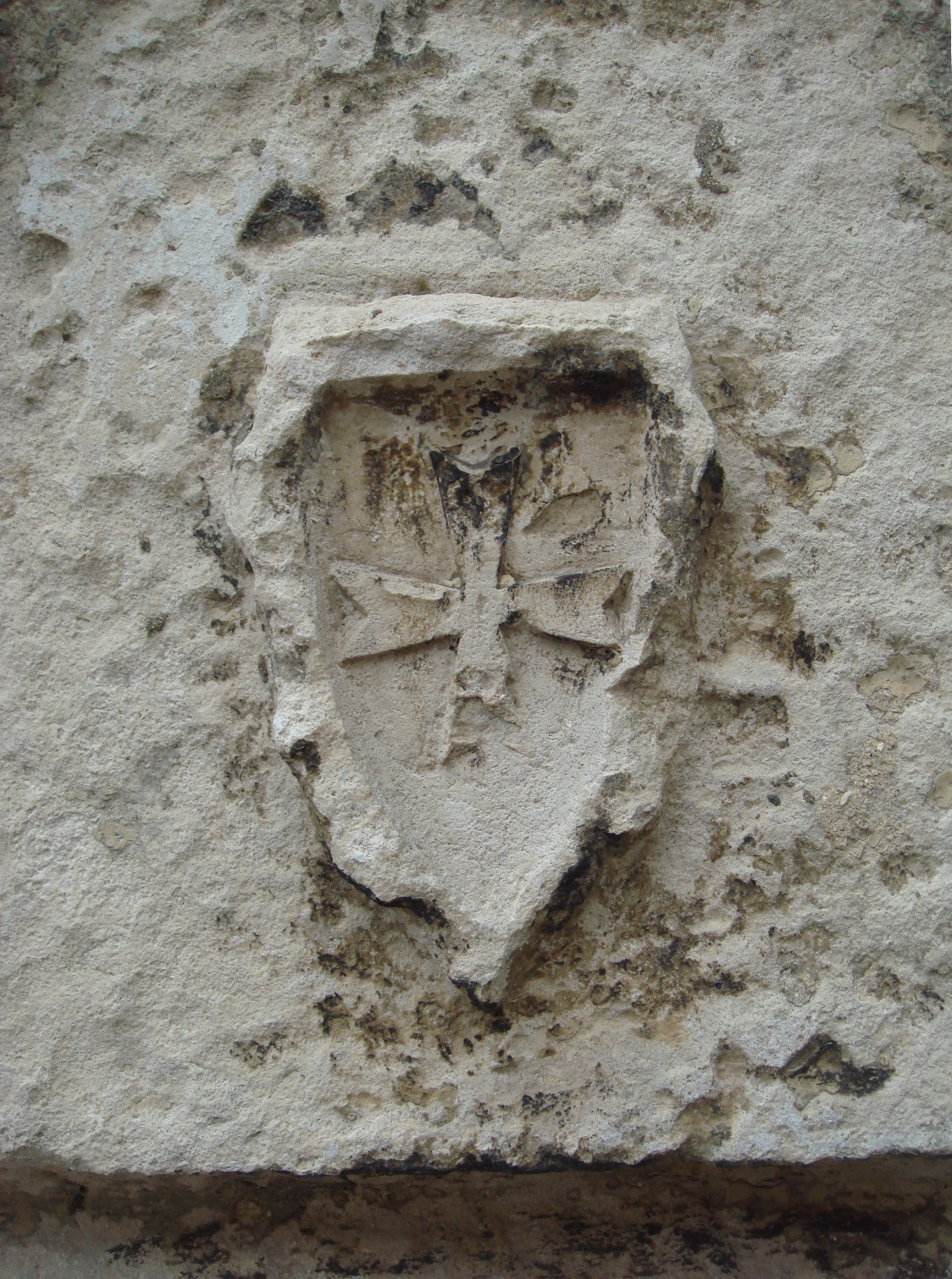
Left image: Cour de la Commanderie in La Rochelle, ancient location of the Templars' headquarters.
Right image: Original Templar cross, Cour de la Commanderie.

The main activities of the city were in the areas of maritime commerce and trade, especially with England, the Low Countries and Spain. In 1196, wealthy bourgeois Alexandre Auffredi sent a fleet of seven ships to Africa seeking wealth. He went bankrupt awaiting the return of his ships; they returned seven years later bearing riches.

=== Knights Templar ===
The Knights Templar had a strong presence in La Rochelle since before the time of Eleanor of Aquitaine, who exempted them from duties and gave them mills in her 1139 Charter. La Rochelle was the Templars' largest base on the Atlantic Ocean, and where they stationed their main fleet. From La Rochelle, they were able to act as intermediaries in trade between England and the Mediterranean. A popular thread of conspiracy theory originating with Holy Blood, Holy Grail has it that the Templars used a fleet of 18 ships which had brought Jacques de Molay from Cyprus to La Rochelle to escape arrest in France. The fleet allegedly left laden with knights and treasures just before the issue of the warrant for the arrest of the Order in October 1307.

=== Hundred Years' War ===
Royal property since 1271, the 1293 sacking of La Rochelle by the Bayonnais during an outbreak of reciprocal piracy between English and French (particularly Norman) sailors was one of the main charges of King Philip IV against King Edward I when he declared the Duchy of Aquitaine forfeit to the French crown, prompting the 1294–1303 Gascon War whose peace terms produced the marriage that led to Edward III's later claims to the French crown.

Following the Treaty of Brétigny during the Hundred Years' War, La Rochelle again came under the rule of the English monarch in 1360. La Rochelle however expelled the English in June 1372, following the naval Battle of La Rochelle, between Castilian-French and English fleets. The French and Spanish decisively defeated the English, securing French control of the Channel for the first time since the Battle of Sluys in 1340. The naval battle of La Rochelle was one of the first cases of the use of handguns on warships, which were deployed by the French and Spanish against the English. Having recovered freedom, La Rochelle refused entry to Du Guesclin, until Charles V recognized the privileges of the city in November 1372.

In 1402, the French adventurer Jean de Béthencourt left La Rochelle and sailed along the coast of Morocco to conquer the Canary Islands.

Until the 15th century, La Rochelle was to be the largest French harbour on the Atlantic coast, dealing mainly in wine, salt and cheese.

=== French Wars of Religion ===
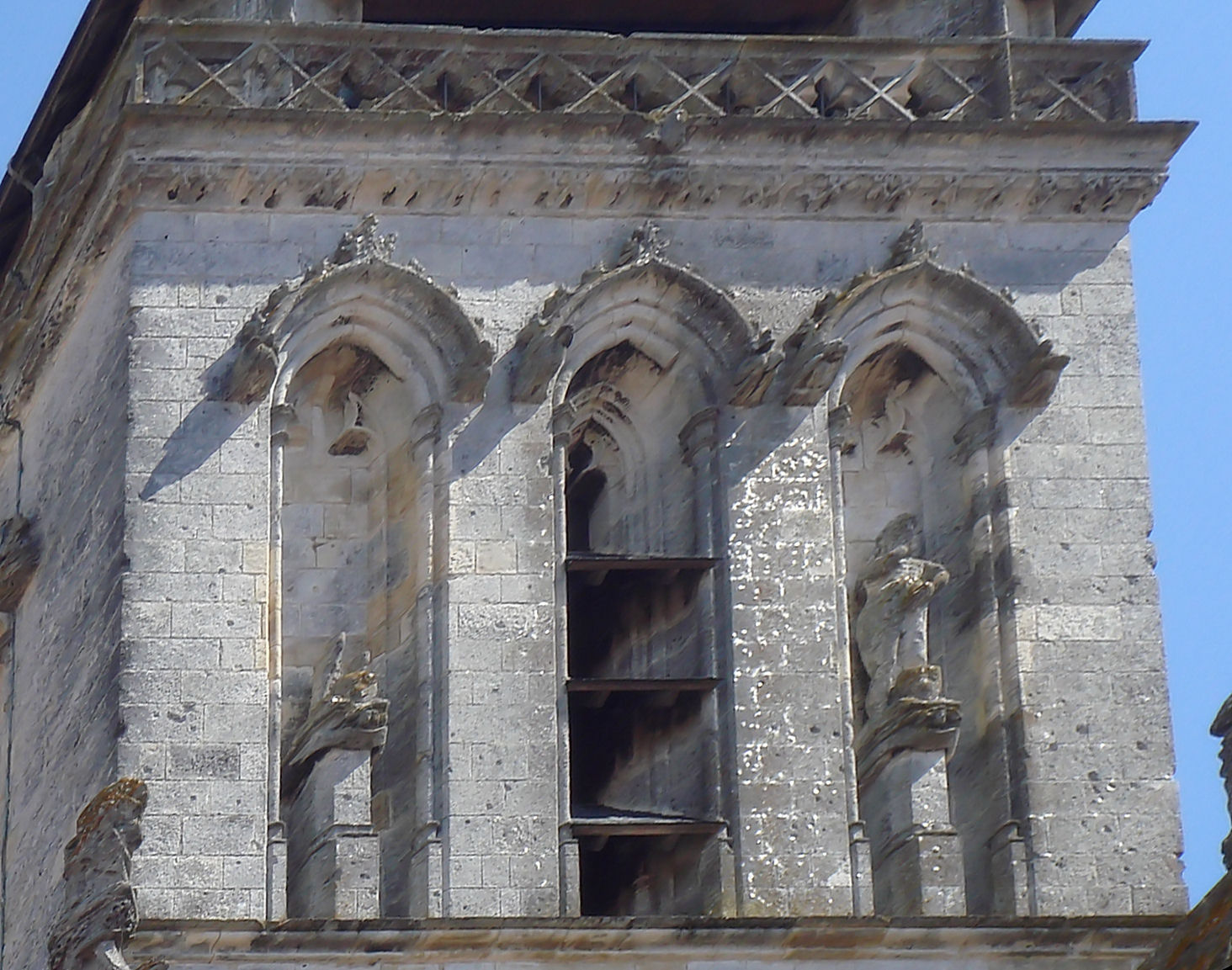
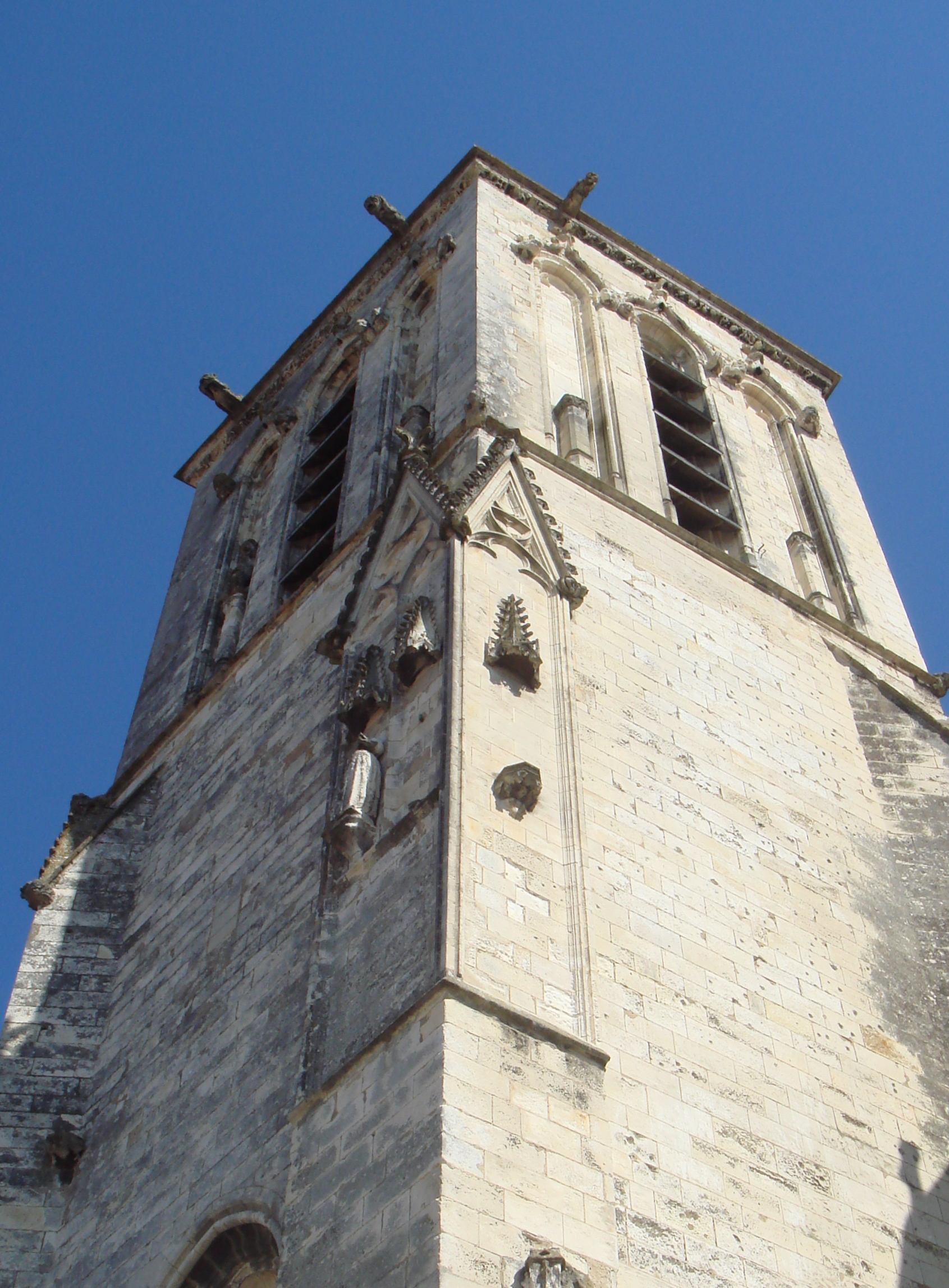
Left image: Remains of Reformation iconoclasm, Clocher Saint-Barthélémy, La Rochelle.
Right image: Remains of iconoclasm, Église Saint-Sauveur, La Rochelle.

During the Renaissance, La Rochelle adopted Protestant ideas. Calvinism propagated in the region, and was suppressed through the Cours présidiaux tribunals established by Henry II, with two heretics burnt at the stake in La Rochelle in 1552. Conversions to Calvinism continued, partly aligned with political resistance to royal power by the local elite, and a popular opposition to taxes and requisitions in the royal building projects to fortify the coast against England.

On the initiative of Gaspard de Coligny, the French Calvinist community (Huguenots) attempted to colonise the New World to find a new home for their religion, with the likes of Pierre Richier and Jean de Léry. After the short-lived attempt of France Antarctique and a failed colony in Brazil, they finally resolved to make a stand in La Rochelle itself. Pierre Richier became "Ministre de l'église de la Rochelle" ("Minister of the Church of La Rochelle") when he returned from Brazil in 1558, and was able to considerably increase the Huguenot presence in La Rochelle, from a small base of about 50 souls who had been secretly educated in the Lutheran faith by Charles de Clermont the previous year. He has been described, by Lancelot Voisin de La Popelinière, as "the father of the church of La Rochelle".

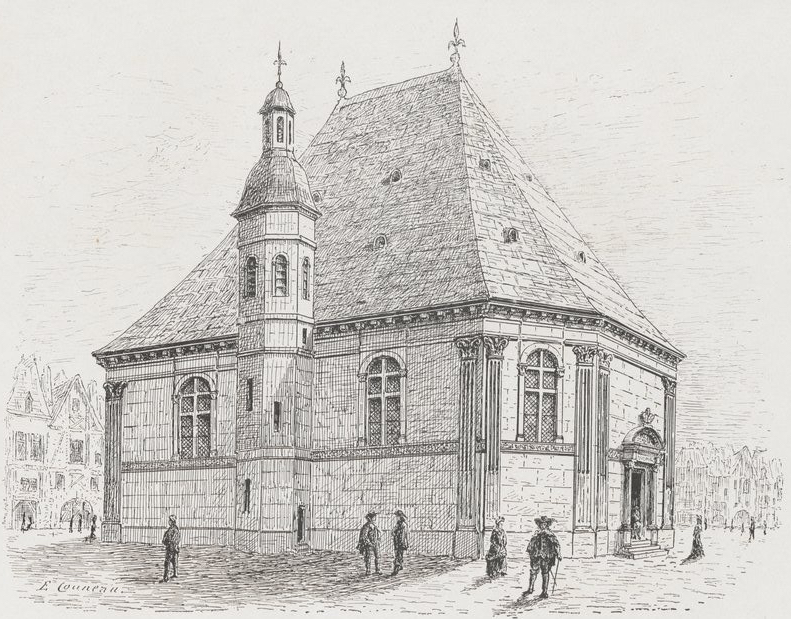
Protestant "Grand Temple" of La Rochelle, built on the Place du Château, modern Place de Verdun, in 1600–1603, accidentally burned down in 1687

La Rochelle and Rouen were the first French cities to experience iconoclastic riots in 1560, at the time of the suppression of the Amboise conspiracy, before the riots spread to many other cities. Further cases iconoclasm broke out in La Rochelle from 30 May 1562, following the Massacre of Vassy. Protestants pillaged churches, destroyed images and statues, and also assassinated 13 Catholic priests in the Tower of the Lantern.

From 1568, La Rochelle became a centre for the Huguenots, and the city declared itself an independent Reformed Republic on the model of Geneva, a "state within a state". This led to numerous conflicts with the Catholic royal government. The city supported the Protestant movement of William of Orange in the Netherlands, and from La Rochelle the Dutch under Louis of Nassau and the Sea Beggars sailed to raid Spanish shipping.

In 1571 the city suffered a blockade by the French Navy commanded by Filippo di Piero Strozzi and Antoine Escalin des Aimars, a former protagonist of the Franco-Ottoman alliance. The French Wars of Religion broke out following the St. Bartholomew's Day massacre in August 1572, and the blockade escalated to the siege of La Rochelle (1572–1573), along with other sieges of Protestant cities such as the Sancerre. The conflict ended with the 1573 Peace of La Rochelle, which restricted the Protestant worship to the three cities of Montauban, Nîmes and La Rochelle. Pierre Richier died in La Rochelle in 1580.

=== Huguenot rebellions ===
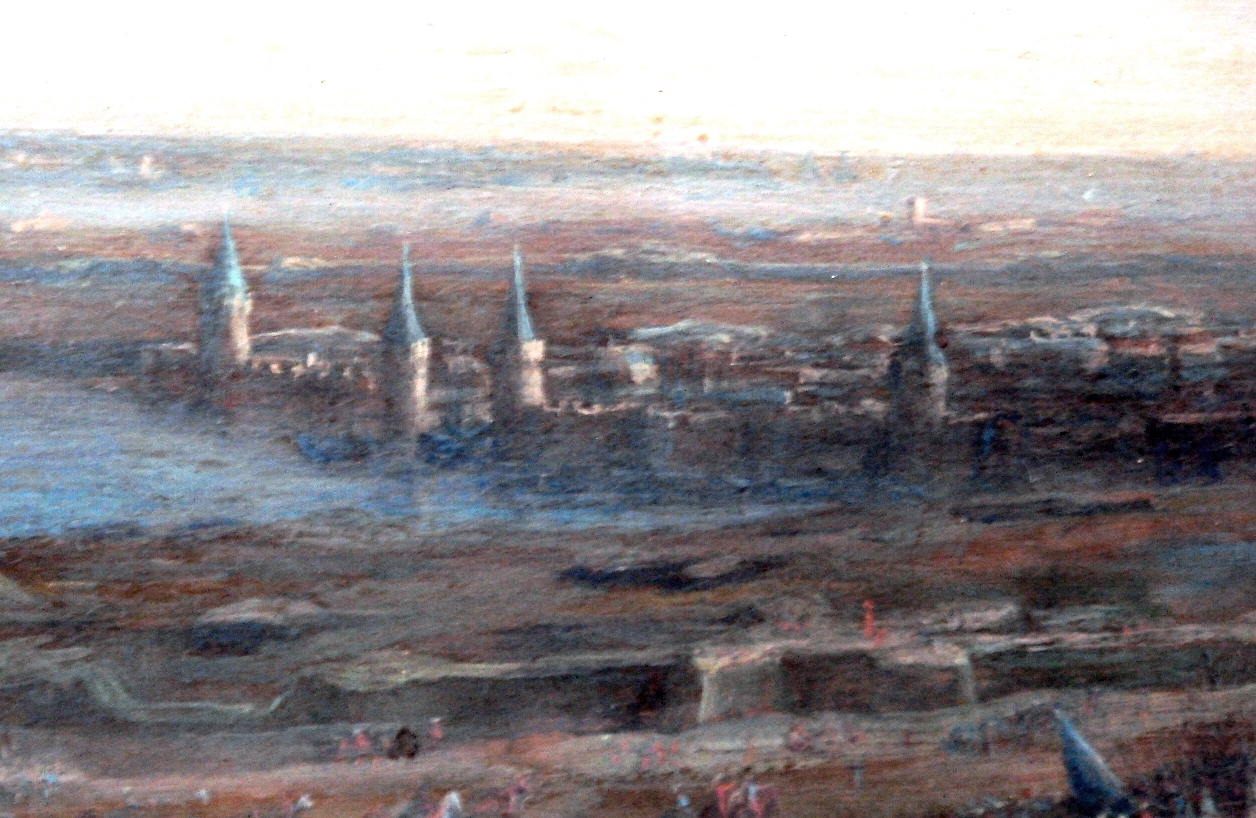
La Rochelle in 1628 – detail of Claude Lorrain Le siège de La Rochelle

Under Henry IV and the regency of his son Louis XIII, the city enjoyed a certain freedom and prosperity. However, La Rochelle entered into conflict with the authority of the adult Louis, beginning with a 1622 revolt. A fleet from La Rochelle fought a royal fleet of 35 ships under Charles, Duke of Guise, in front of Saint-Martin-de-Ré, but was defeated on 27 October 1622, leading to the signing of the Peace of Montpellier.

==== Revolt of Soubise (1625) ====
In 1625, a new Huguenot revolt led by Duke Henri de Rohan and his brother Soubise led to the Capture of Ré island by the forces of Louis XIII. Soubise conquered large parts of the Atlantic coast, but the supporting fleet of La Rochelle was finally defeated by Montmorency, as was Soubise with 3,000 men, when he led a counter-attack against the royal troops who had landed on the island of Ré.

==== Siege of La Rochelle (1627–1628) ====
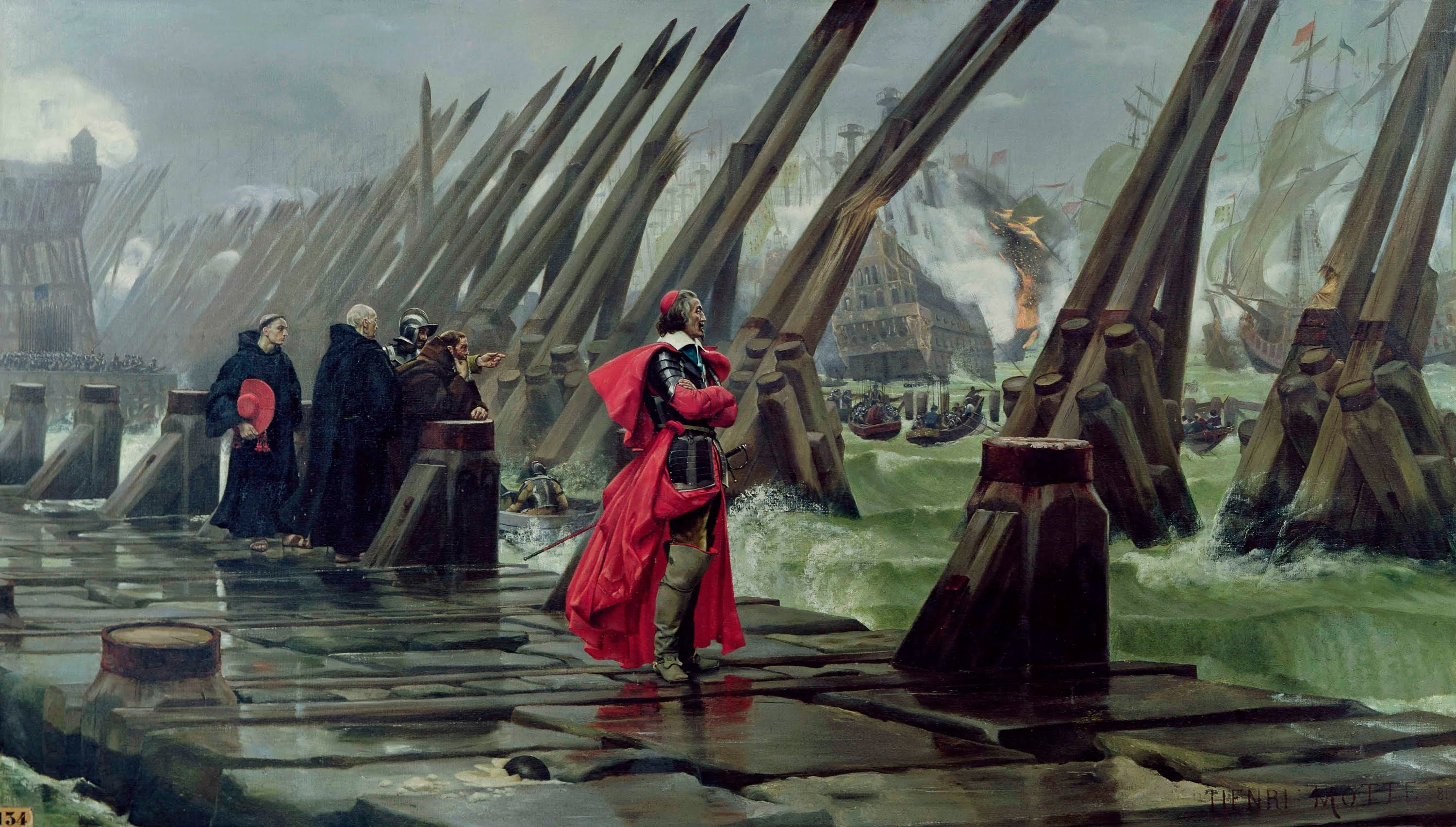
Cardinal Richelieu at the siege of La Rochelle, Henri Motte, 1881

Following these events, Louis XIII and his Chief Minister Cardinal Richelieu declared the suppression of the Huguenot revolt the first priority of the kingdom. The English came to the support of La Rochelle, starting the Anglo-French War, by sending a major expedition under the Duke of Buckingham. The expedition however ended in a fiasco for England with the siege of Saint-Martin-de-Ré. Meanwhile, cannon shots were exchanged on 10 September 1627 between La Rochelle and Royal troops, provoking the siege in which Cardinal Richelieu blockaded the city for 14 months, until the city surrendered and lost its mayor and its privileges. The siege forms much of the backdrop to the later chapters of Alexandre Dumas' classic novel, The Three Musketeers.

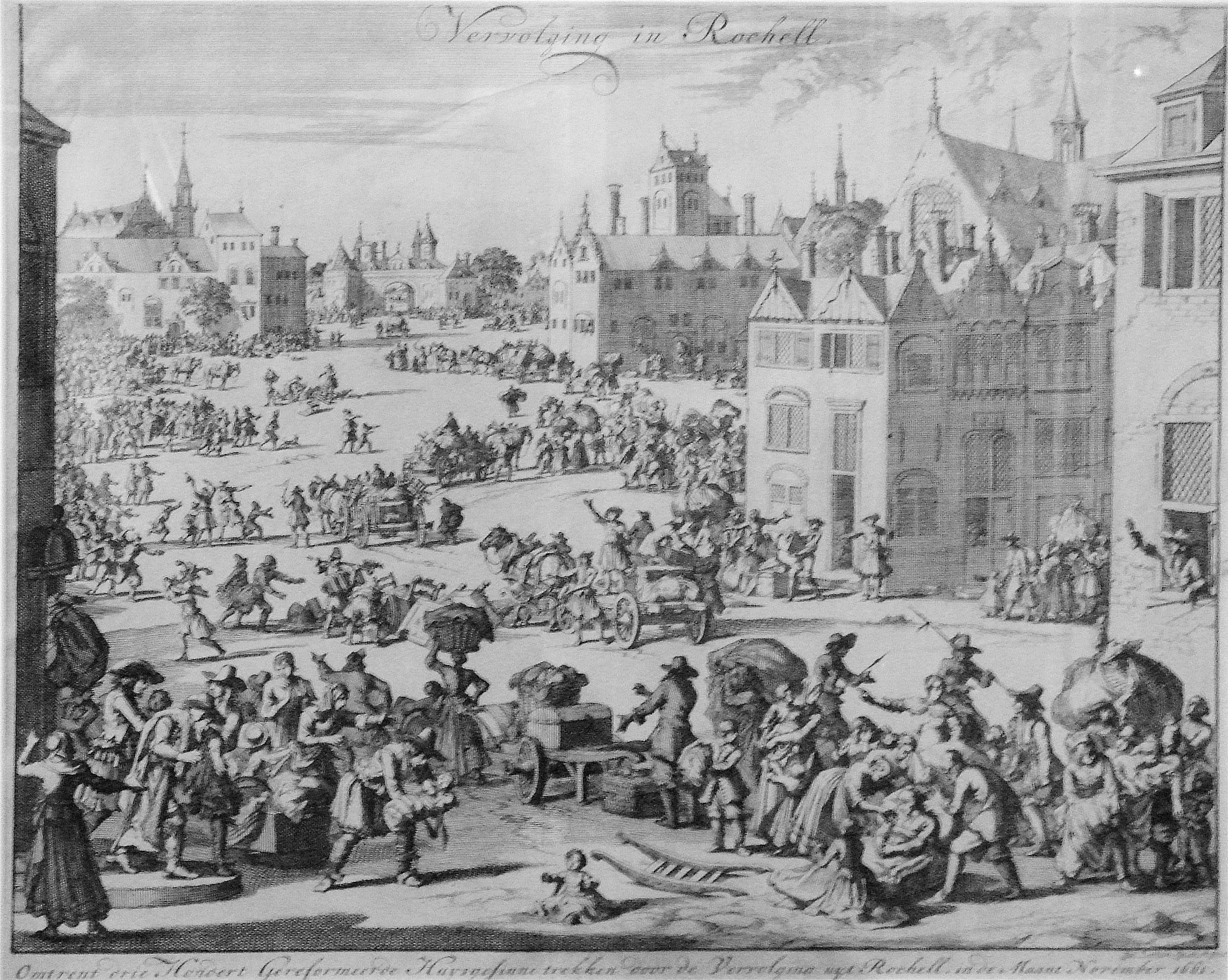
Expulsion from La Rochelle of 300 Protestant families in November 1661, Jan Luiken (1649–1712)

In November 1661, one of the first independent acts of King Louis XIV was to expel 300 La Rochelle Huguenot families, whose property purchases had drawn Catholic resentment.

The growing persecution of the Huguenots culminated with the Revocation of the Edict of Nantes by Louis XIV in 1685. Many Huguenots emigrated, founding such cities as New Rochelle in the vicinity of today's New York in 1689.

=== La Rochelle and the New World ===
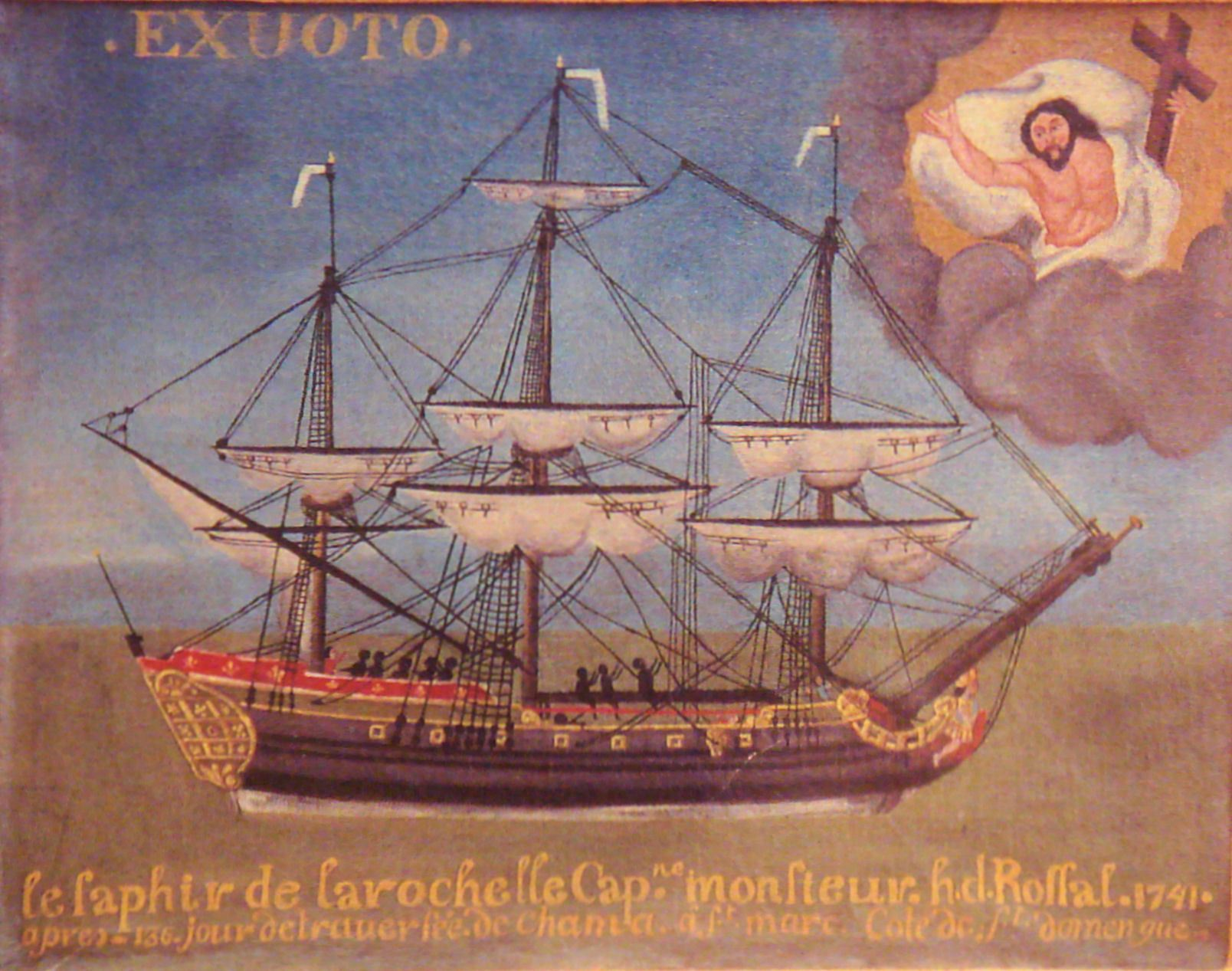
La Rochelle slave ship Le Saphir ex-voto, 1741

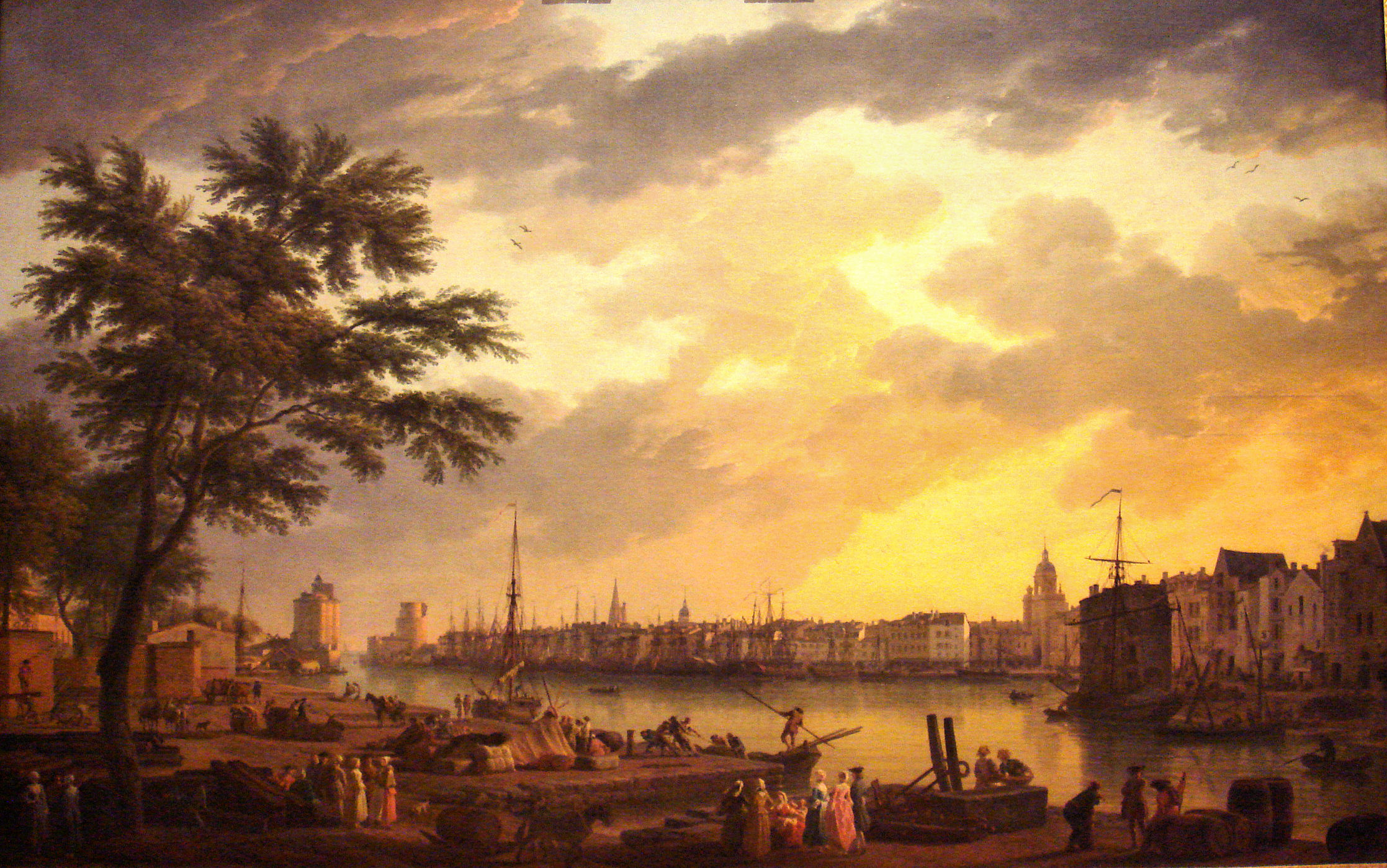
La Rochelle harbour in 1762 – Joseph Vernet; Musée de la Marine

Because of its western location, which saved days of sailing time, La Rochelle enjoyed successful fishing in the western Atlantic and trading with the New World, which served to counterbalance the disadvantage of not being at the mouth of a river (useful for shipping goods to and from the interior). Its Protestant ship-owning and merchant class prospered in the 16th century until the Wars of Religion devastated the city. The British navy in wartime were alert that shore watchers at La Rochelle were employed.

The period following the wars was a prosperous one, marked by intense exchanges with the New World (Nouvelle France in Canada, and the Antilles). La Rochelle armateurs (shipowners) became very active in triangular trade with the New World, dealing in the slave trade with Africa, sugar trade with plantations of the West Indies, and fur trade with Canada. This was a period of high artistic, cultural and architectural achievements for the city. La Rochelle was also the port city from which the Carignan-Salieres Regiment departed for Nouvelle France. In 1664, based upon attacks by the Iroquois against the Quebec inhabitants and following the request of the New France Sovereign Council, the French finance minister Jean-Baptiste Colbert ordered the 24 companies composing the Carignan-Salières Regiment to duty in New France. Beginning with departures from the port of La Rochelle, France on 19 Apr 1665, five troop ships and one supply ship left the French coast. A sixth troop ship, Le Breze, began the journey from the Antilles island in the West Indies. All of the seven ships arrived at Quebec City during the three-month period between 19 Jun 1665 and 14 Sep 1665. They carried approximately 1,200 men of the regiment. Additionally, it was from this port city that many of the estimated 768 women known as the Filles du Roi (Daughters of the King), set sail for Quebec during the period of 1663 to 1673.

Robert de La Salle departed from La Rochelle, France, on 24 July 1684, with the aim of setting up a colony at the mouth of the Mississippi, eventually establishing Fort Saint Louis in Texas.

The city eventually lost its trade and prominence during the decades spanning the Seven Years' War, the French Revolution and the Napoleonic Wars. During that period France lost many of the territorial possessions which it had had in the New World, and also saw a significant decrease in its sea power in the continuing conflicts with Britain, ultimately diminishing the role of such harbours as La Rochelle. After abolitionist movements led by such people as Samuel de Missy, the slave trade of La Rochelle ended with the onset of the French Revolution and the war with England in the 1790s, the last La Rochelle slave ship, the Saint-Jacques being captured in 1793 in the Gulf of Guinea. In February 1794, the National Convention passed the Law of 4 February 1794, which effectively freed all colonial slaves.

In 1809, the Battle of the Basque Roads took place near La Rochelle, in which a British fleet defeated the French Atlantic Fleet.

=== La Rochelle faience ===
La Rochelle became one of the French centres for faience at the end of the 18th century. Bernard Palissy was born in the region and had some bearing in this development. During the 18th century, its style was greatly influenced by Chinese themes and Japanese Kakiemon-type designs. Many of these ceramics can be viewed at the Musée d'Orbigny-Bernon.

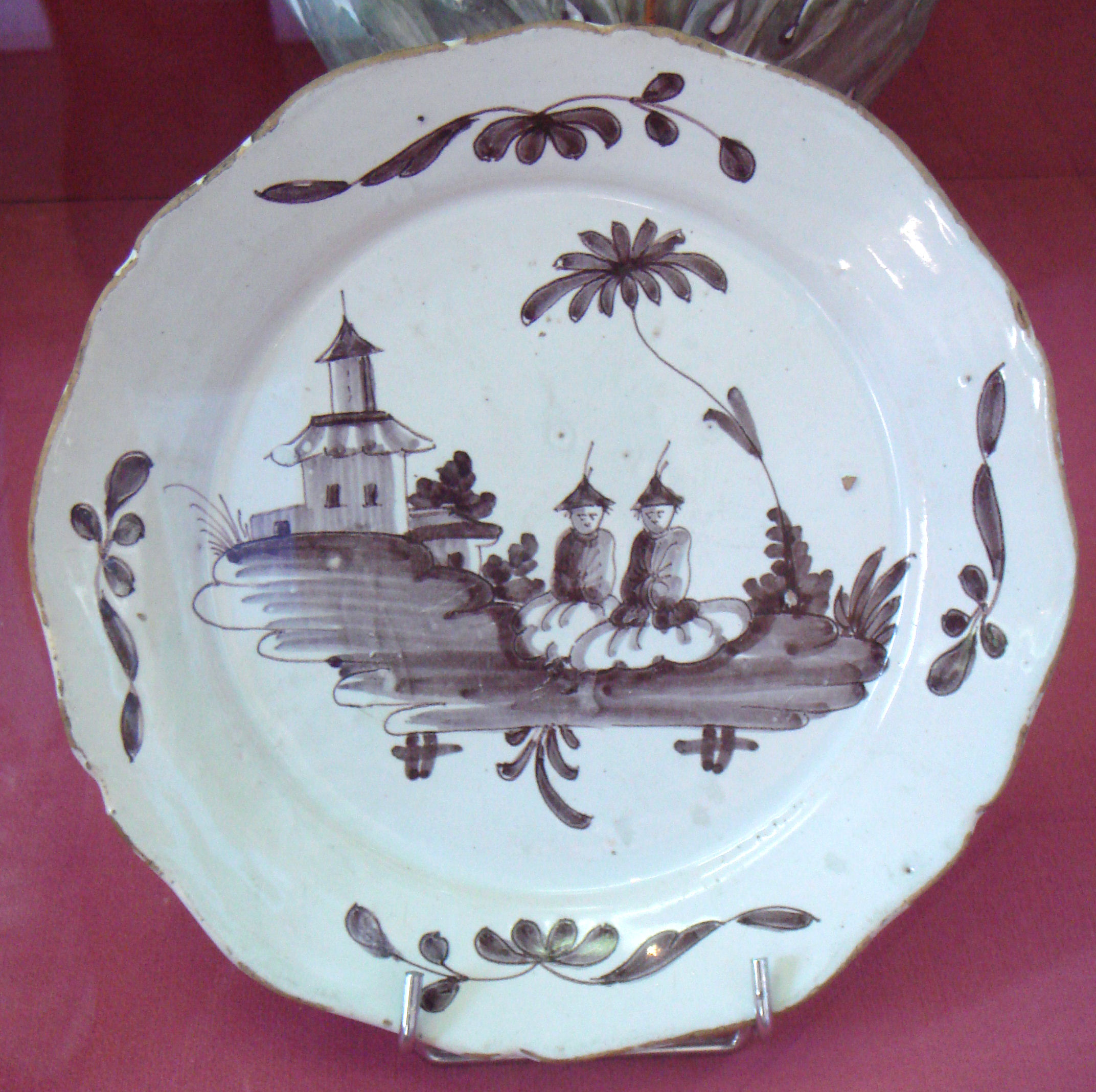
La Rochelle faience, 18th century.

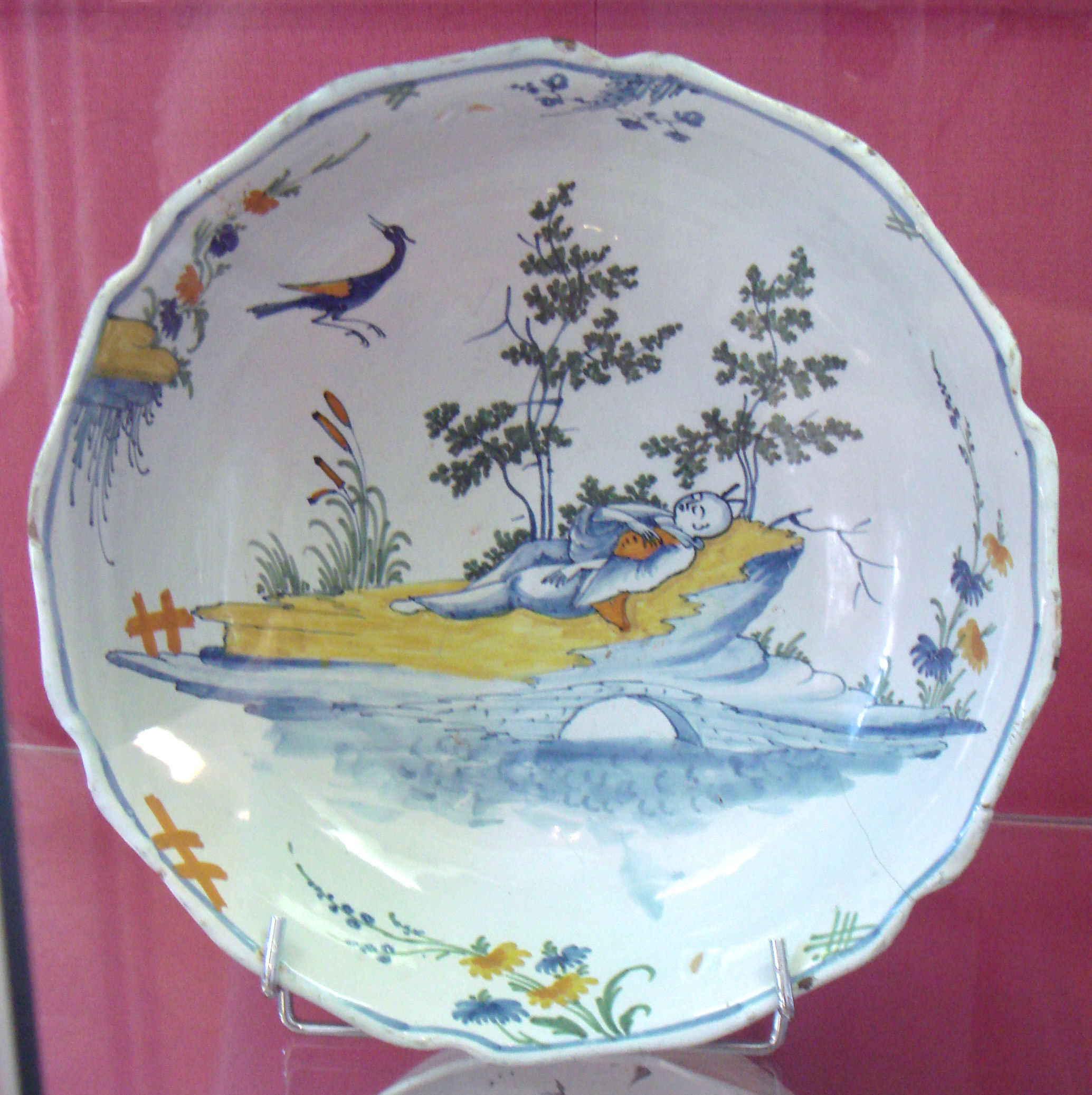
La Rochelle faience with Chinese decorations.

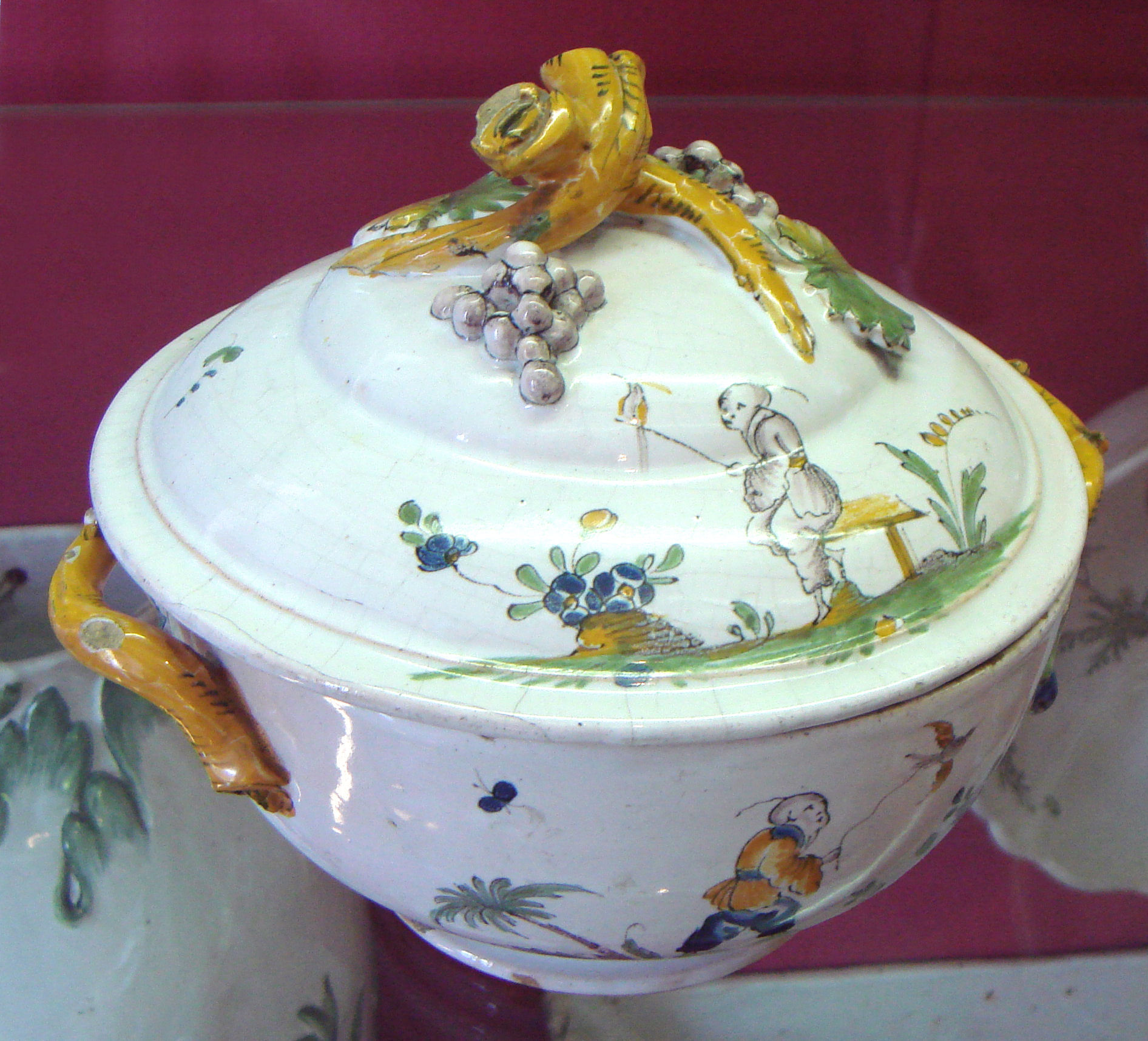
La Rochelle faience pot, 18th century.

=== 19th century ===
In 1864, the harbour of La Rochelle (area of the "Bassin à flot" behind the water locks), was the site for the maiden dive experiments of the first mechanically-powered submarine in the World, Plongeur, commanded by Marie-Joseph-Camille Doré, a native of La Rochelle.

=== Second World War ===
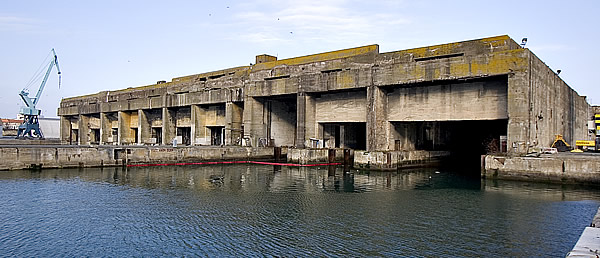
U-boat pens at the harbor of La Rochelle (2007)

During the Second World War, Germany established a submarine naval base at La Pallice (the main port of La Rochelle).

A German stronghold, La Rochelle was the last French city to be liberated at the end of the war. The Allied siege of La Rochelle took place between 12 September 1944 and 7 May 1945. The stronghold, including the islands of Ré and Oléron, was held by 20,000 German troops under German vice-admiral Ernst Schirlitz. Following negotiations by the French Navy frigate captain Meyer, the general German capitulation occurred on 7 May and French troops entered La Rochelle on 8 May.

The submarine base became the setting for parts of the movie Das Boot. The U-boat scenes in Raiders of the Lost Ark were also shot in La Rochelle. The base is featured in the computer game Commandos 2: Men of Courage. It was also chosen in 2018 for the location shooting of the German television series Das Boot (a sequel to the 1981 classic).

== La Rochelle today ==
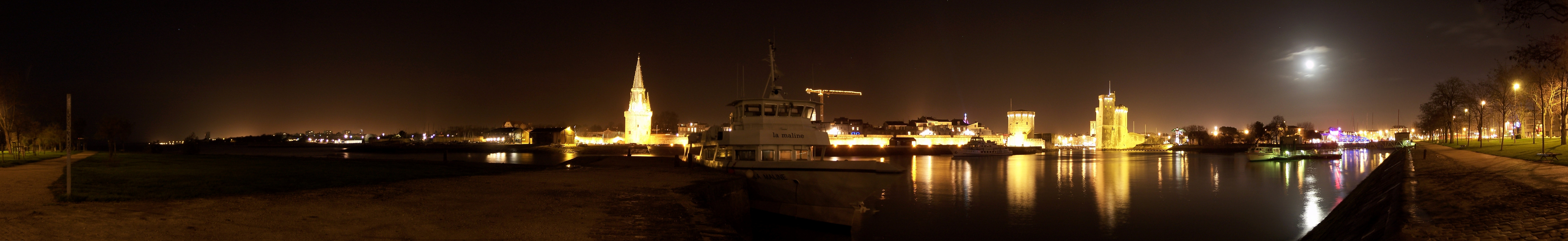
Panoramic picture of the harbour towers at night.

La Rochelle possesses a commercial deep water harbour, named La Pallice. The large submarine pens built during World War II still stand there, although they are not in use. La Pallice is equipped with oil unloading equipment, and mainly handles tropical wood. It is also the location of the fishing fleet, which was moved from the old harbour in the centre of the city during the 1980s.

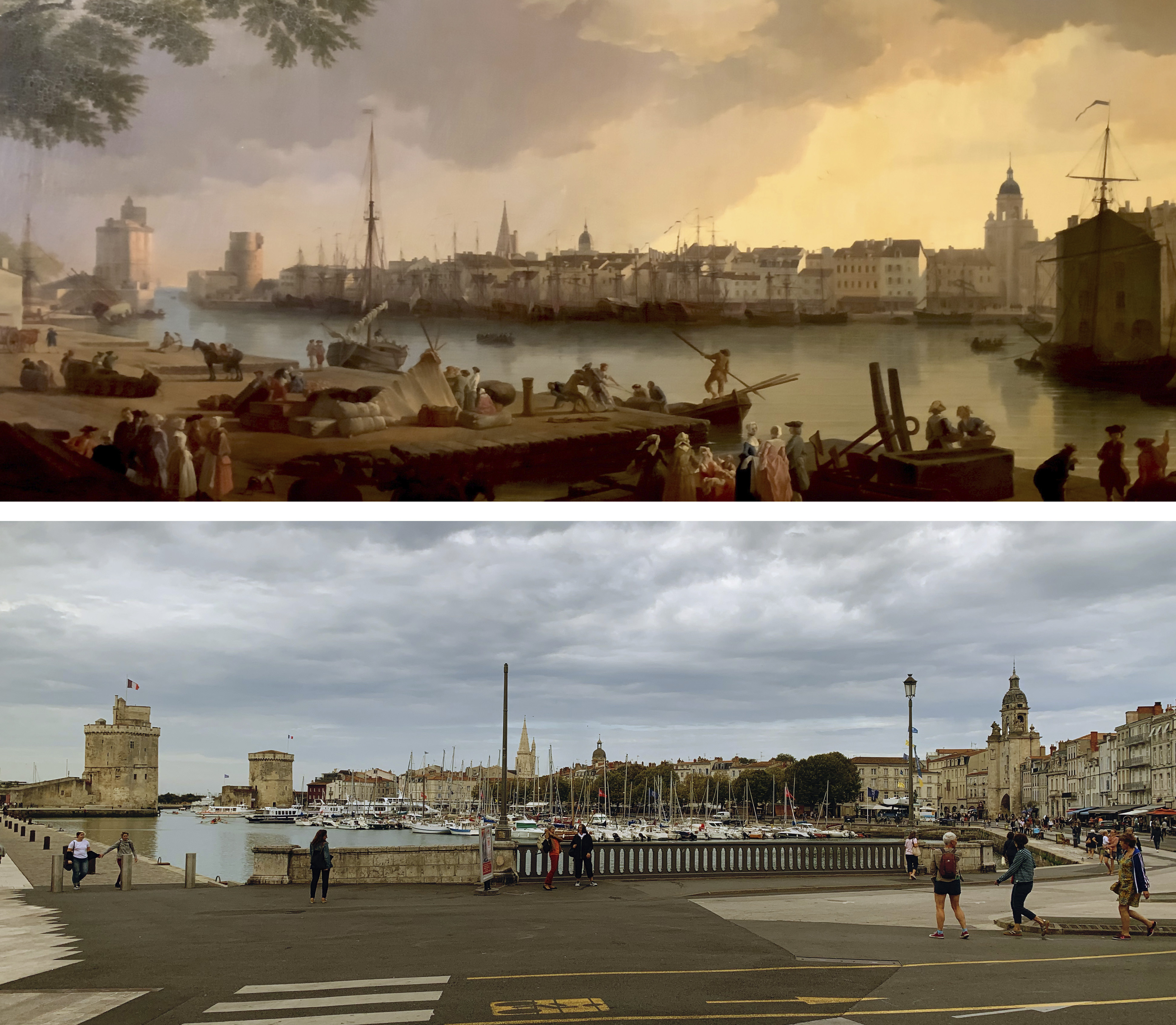
La Rochelle harbour by Vernet in 1762 and the same view 2019

La Rochelle has a very big aquarium, and a small botanical garden (the Jardin des plantes de La Rochelle).

The Calypso, the ship used by Jacques-Yves Cousteau as a mobile laboratory for oceanography, and which was sunk after a collision in the port of Singapore (1996) is now on display (rotting) at the Maritime Museum of La Rochelle.

The French Socialist Party has held its annual summer convention (Université d'été) in La Rochelle since 1983.

=== Culture ===
The Festival de la Fiction is a film festival that films screens new films in official competitions (French, European, and other Francophone countries), out of competition, and also in special screenings. The first ten years of the festival, from around 1998, took place in Saint-Tropez, before moving to La Rochelle in around 2013 or 2014.

Since 1985, the city has hosted Les Francofolies de La Rochelle, one of the largest music festivals in France.

=== Tourism ===
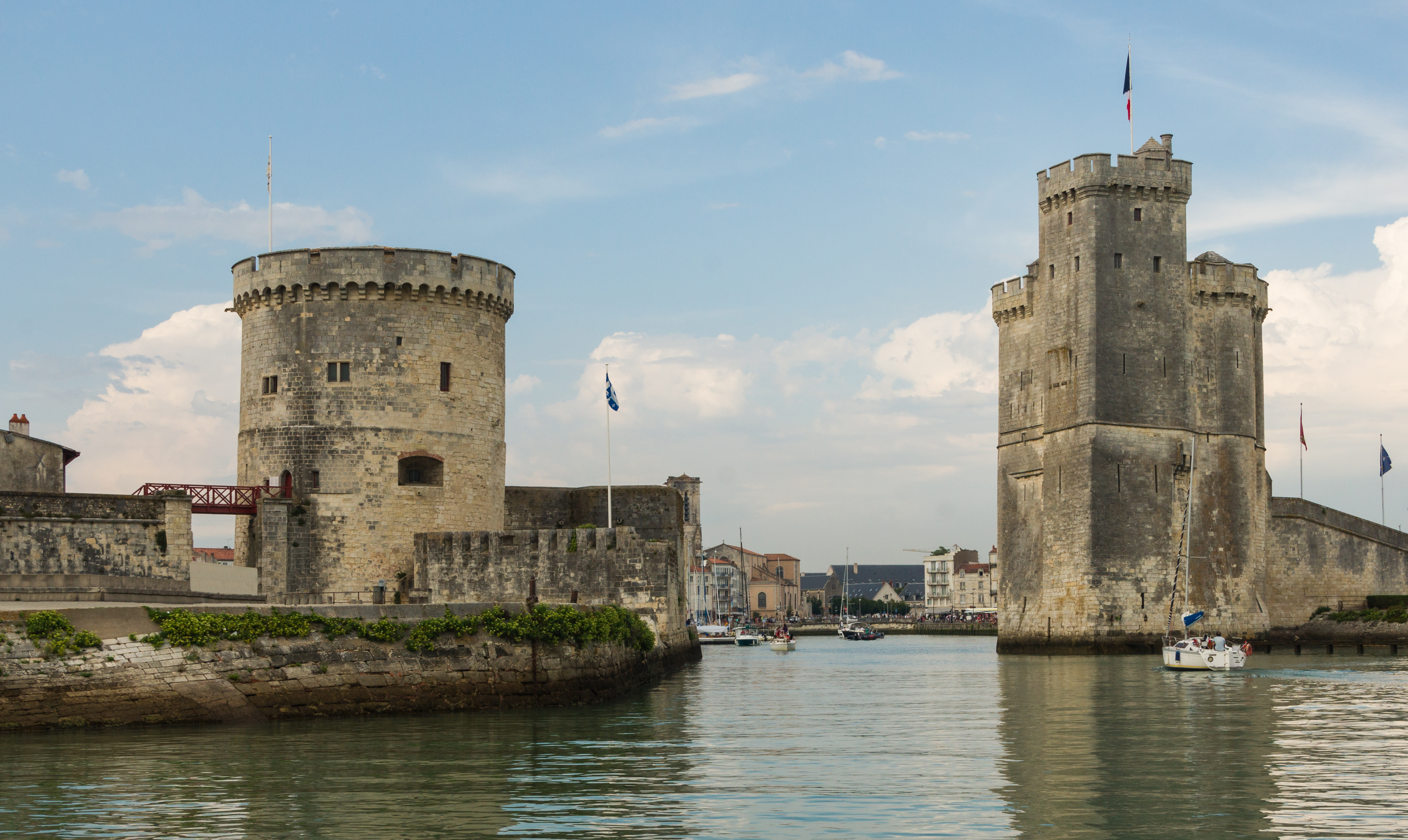
Harbour towers

La Rochelle's main feature is the "Vieux Port" ("Old Harbour"), which is at the heart of the city, picturesque and lined with seafood restaurants. The city walls are open to an evening promenade. The old town has been well preserved. Three medieval towers are a prominent tourist attraction at the entrance to the harbor: The Chain Tower, The Lantern Tower and Saint Nicolas Tower. From the harbour, boating trips can be taken to the Île d'Aix and Fort Boyard (home to the TV show of the same name). Nearby Île de Ré is a short drive to the North. The countryside of the surrounding Charente-Maritime is very rural and full of history (Saintes). To the North is Venise Verte, a marshy area of country, crisscrossed with tiny canals and a resort for inland boating. Inland is the country of Cognac and Pineau. The nearby Île de Ré is accessible via a bridge from La Rochelle.

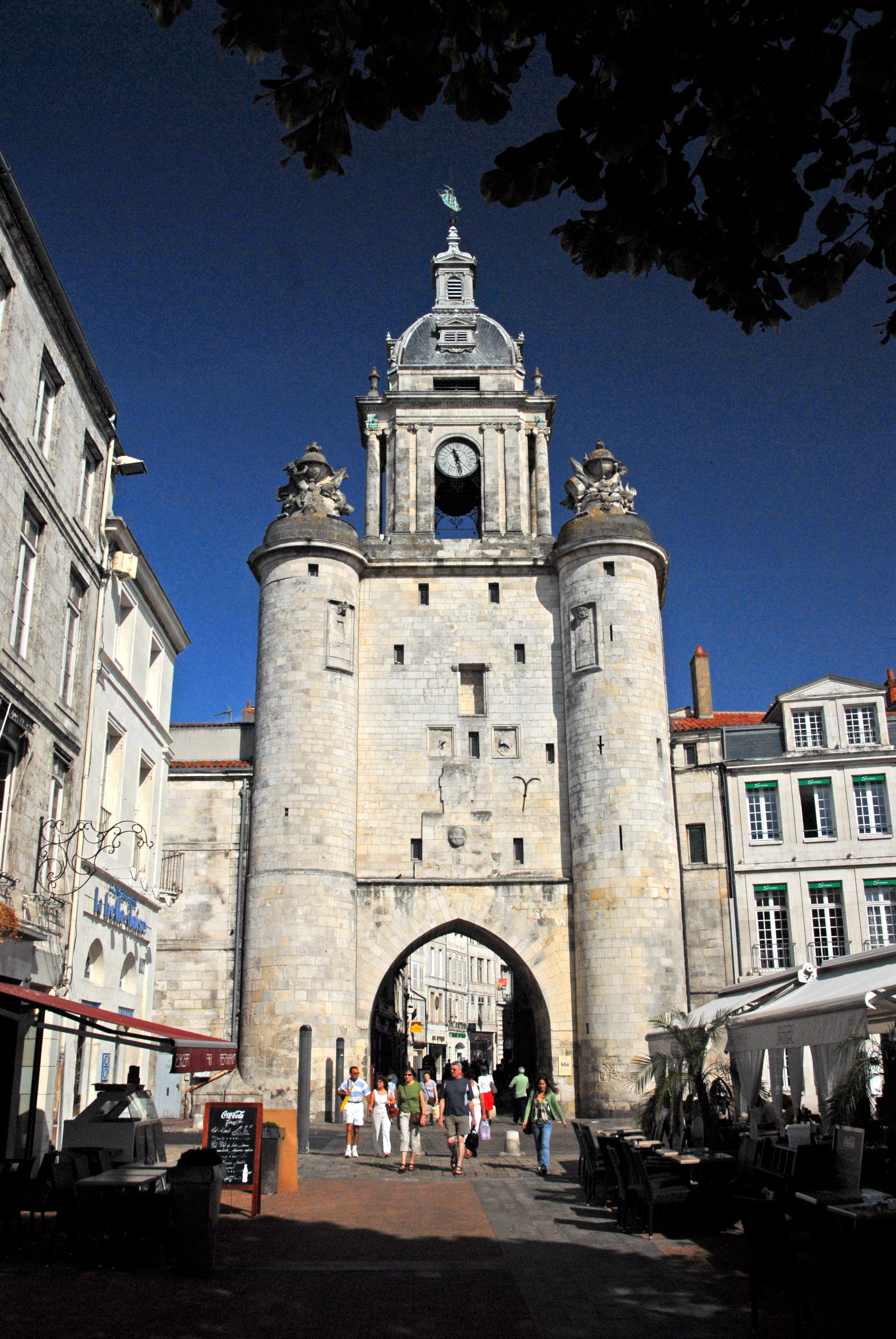
"Grosse Horloge" tower

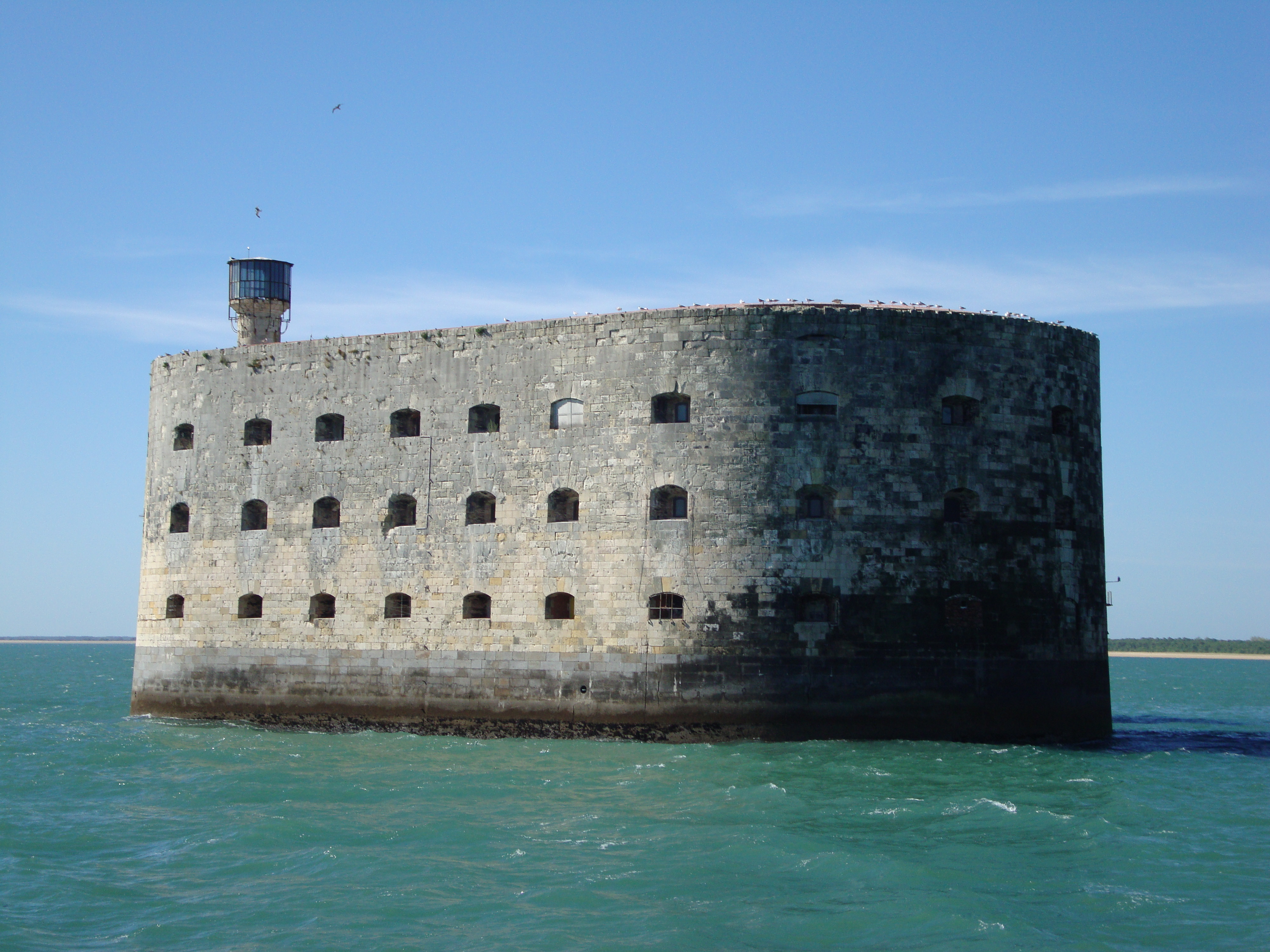
Fort Boyard

=== Transport ===
La Rochelle is served by La Rochelle - Île de Ré Airport, which has progressively developed over the last 5 years. However, the airport provides direct routes to some European and Middle East destinations. The nearest international airports are Nantes Atlantique Airport, located 137 km (85 mi) north and Bordeaux-Mérignac Airport, located 191 km (119 mi) south east of La Rochelle.

The train station Gare de La Rochelle offers connections to Bordeaux, Nantes, Poitiers, Paris and several regional destinations.

OFP La Rochelle is a freight railway serving the port.

La Rochelle launched one of the first successful bicycle sharing systems in 1974.

=== Education ===
The original university in La Rochelle was University Institutes of Technology, established in 1968. Then, University of La Rochelle was incorporated to the technology institute in 1993. And, the second university in the city is the Excelia Group (La Rochelle Business School), which was established in 1988. The city has more than 10,000 students each year, with 7,000 and 3,500 students respectively.

=== Les Minimes ===
Located in La Rochelle is Les Minimes, a marina considered the city's new port for around 5,000 boat vessels. The newly built area also houses university campuses for 10,000 students, which has shops, restaurants, a cinema, and other amenities. There are many residences in a student village, which are accommodation for locals, students or tourists. The port is the biggest in Europe, and has a long boat-building past, which today includes companies such as Amel Yachts.

== Geography ==
=== Geology ===
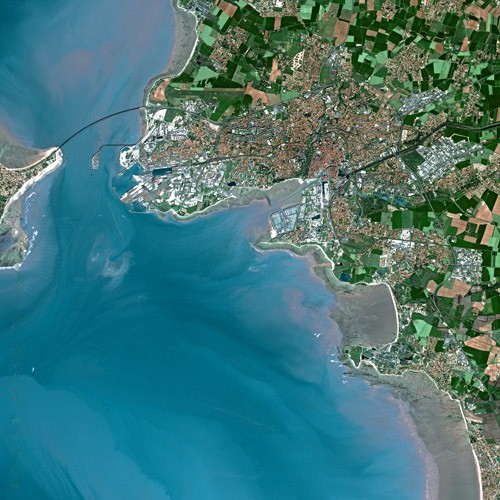
La Rochelle seen from Spot Satellite

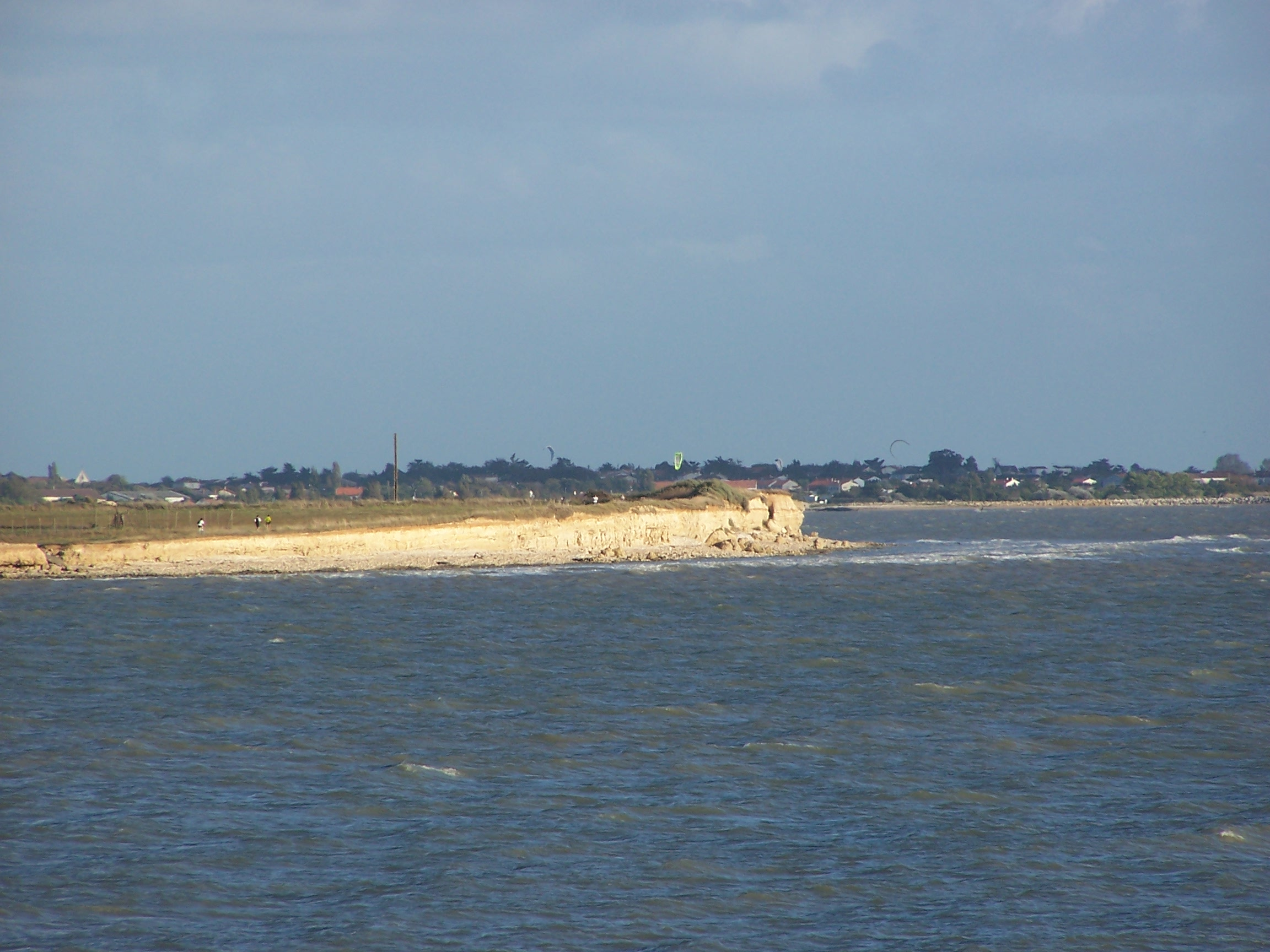
The limestone cliffs around La Rochelle reveal the Jurassic geology of the area

The bedrock of La Rochelle and surrounding areas is composed of layers of limestone dating back to the Sequanian stage (upper Oxfordian stage) of the Jurassic period (circa 160 million years ago), when a large part of France was submerged. Many of these layers are visible in the white cliffs that border the sea, which contain many small marine fossils. Layers of thick white rock, formed during period of relatively warm seas, alternate with highly fragile layers containing sand and remains of mud, formed during colder periods, and with layers containing various corals, that were formed during warmer, tropical times. The limestone thus formed is traditionally used as the main building material throughout the region.

The area of La Pointe du Chay about five kilometres (three miles) from La Rochelle is a cliff area visited for leisurely geological surveys.

=== Climate ===
Under Köppen's climate classification, La Rochelle features an oceanic climate. Although at the same latitude as Quebec City in Canada or the Kuril Islands in Russia, the area experiences mild weather throughout the year due to the influence of the Gulf Stream waters, the summers are relatively warm, and insolation is remarkably high—the highest in Western France, including sea resorts much further to the south such as Biarritz. La Rochelle seldom experiences very cold or very warm weather. These specific conditions – summer: dry and sunny, winter: mild and wet – have led to the establishment of a Mediterranean-type vegetation cohabiting with more continental and oceanic types of vegetation.

Climate data for La Rochelle, France (1991–2020 averages, extremes 1955–present)
Month	Jan	Feb	Mar	Apr	May	Jun	Jul	Aug	Sep	Oct	Nov	Dec	Year
Record high °C (°F)	16.3 (61.3)	21.2 (70.2)	25.0 (77.0)	29.1 (84.4)	33.6 (92.5)	40.5 (104.9)	41.7 (107.1)	39.4 (102.9)	34.6 (94.3)	30.1 (86.2)	22.2 (72.0)	18.7 (65.7)	41.7 (107.1)
Mean daily maximum °C (°F)	9.6 (49.3)	10.6 (51.1)	13.6 (56.5)	16.1 (61.0)	19.6 (67.3)	22.8 (73.0)	24.6 (76.3)	24.9 (76.8)	22.5 (72.5)	18.3 (64.9)	13.4 (56.1)	10.3 (50.5)	17.2 (63.0)
Daily mean °C (°F)	7.0 (44.6)	7.3 (45.1)	9.8 (49.6)	12.0 (53.6)	15.5 (59.9)	18.6 (65.5)	20.5 (68.9)	20.6 (69.1)	18.0 (64.4)	14.7 (58.5)	10.4 (50.7)	7.5 (45.5)	13.5 (56.3)
Mean daily minimum °C (°F)	4.4 (39.9)	4.1 (39.4)	6.1 (43.0)	7.9 (46.2)	11.3 (52.3)	14.4 (57.9)	16.4 (61.5)	16.3 (61.3)	13.6 (56.5)	11.2 (52.2)	7.4 (45.3)	4.8 (40.6)	9.8 (49.6)
Record low °C (°F)	−11.5 (11.3)	−13.6 (7.5)	−9.2 (15.4)	−2.2 (28.0)	1.9 (35.4)	4.9 (40.8)	8.1 (46.6)	8.8 (47.8)	4.7 (40.5)	−0.4 (31.3)	−5.4 (22.3)	−9.5 (14.9)	−13.6 (7.5)
Average precipitation mm (inches)	76.3 (3.00)	56.1 (2.21)	57.4 (2.26)	60.7 (2.39)	50.9 (2.00)	39.3 (1.55)	40.0 (1.57)	46.2 (1.82)	59.7 (2.35)	83.7 (3.30)	94.6 (3.72)	89.5 (3.52)	754.4 (29.70)
Average precipitation days (≥ 1.0 mm)	12.2	10.0	9.6	9.7	8.5	7.2	6.3	6.5	7.2	11.4	12.5	13.0	114.1
Average snowy days	1.0	0.9	0.5	0.2	0.0	0.0	0.0	0.0	0.0	0.0	0.2	0.9	3.7
Average relative humidity (%)	87	84	80	78	79	77	76	77	79	83	86	88	81.2
Mean monthly sunshine hours	91.0	130.9	178.8	230.6	257.8	252.8	296.8	277.6	233.5	154.7	108.5	90.3	2,303.1
Source 1: Meteo France (sun, 2009-2020)
Source 2: Infoclimat.fr (humidity and snowy days 1961–1990)

== Population ==
Its inhabitants are called "les Rochelaises" and "les Rochelais" in French. The population data in the table and graph below refer to the commune of La Rochelle proper, in its geography at the given years. The commune of La Rochelle absorbed part of the former commune of Saint-Maurice in 1858 and Laleu in 1880.

Historical population

Year	Pop.	±% p.a.
1793	22,000	—
1800	17,512	−3.21%
1806	18,346	+0.78%
1821	12,327	−2.62%
1831	14,629	+1.73%
1836	14,857	+0.31%
1841	16,720	+2.39%
1846	17,358	+0.75%
1851	16,505	−1.00%
1856	16,175	−0.40%
1861	18,904	+3.17%
1866	18,720	−0.20%
1872	19,506	+0.69%
1876	19,583	+0.10%
1881	22,464	+2.78%
1886	23,829	+1.19%
1891	26,808	+2.38%
1896	28,376	+1.14%
1901	31,559	+2.15%

Year	Pop.	±% p.a.
1906	33,858	+1.42%
1911	36,371	+1.44%
1921	39,770	+0.90%
1926	41,521	+0.87%
1931	45,043	+1.64%
1936	47,737	+1.17%
1946	48,923	+0.25%
1954	58,799	+2.33%
1962	66,590	+1.57%
1968	73,347	+1.62%
1975	79,757	+1.20%
1982	75,840	−0.72%
1990	71,094	−0.80%
1999	76,584	+0.83%
2007	76,848	+0.04%
2012	74,123	−0.72%
2017	75,735	+0.43%
2023	79,851	+0.89%

Source: EHESS and INSEE (1968-2023)

== Landmarks ==
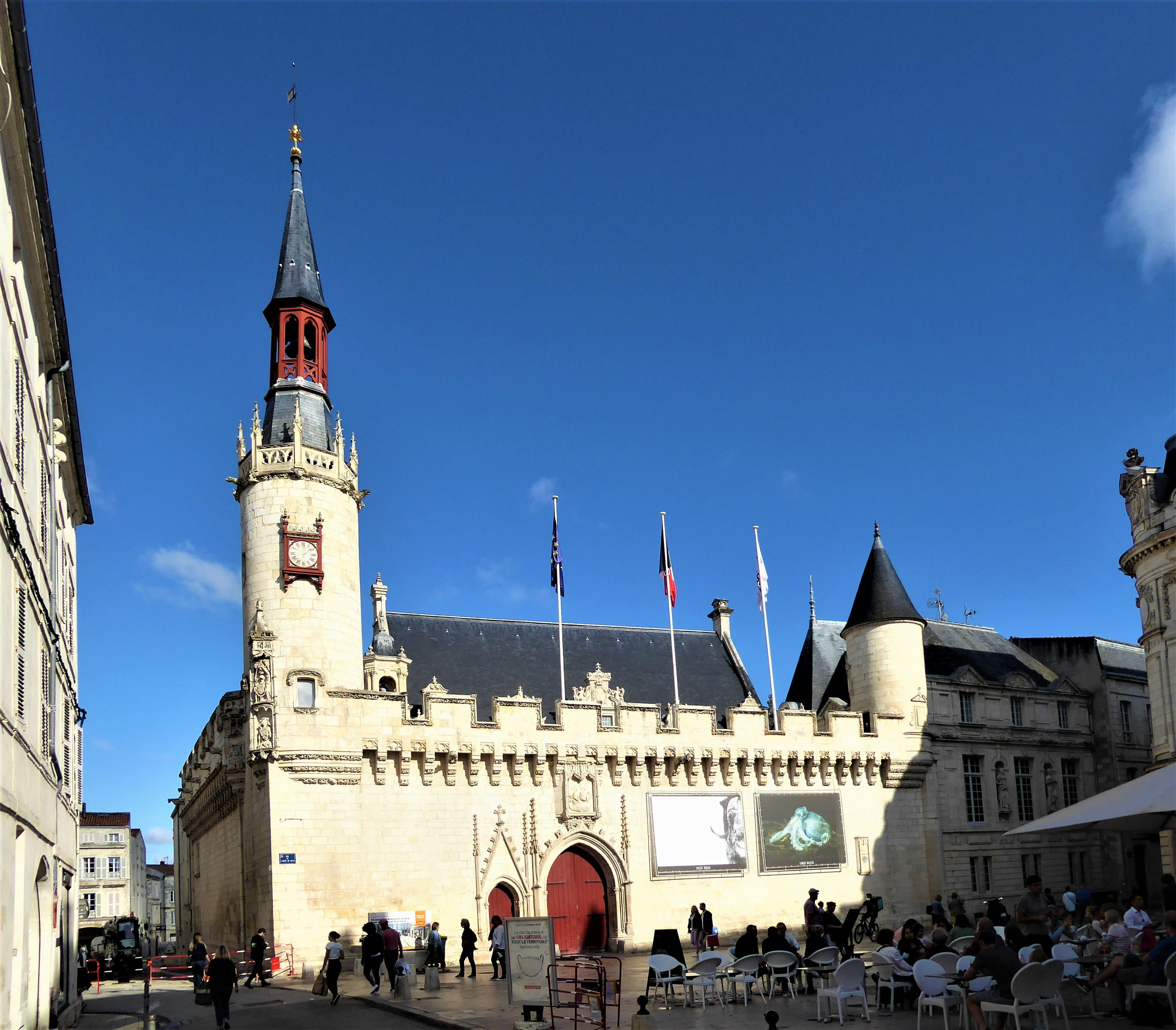
The Hôtel de Ville

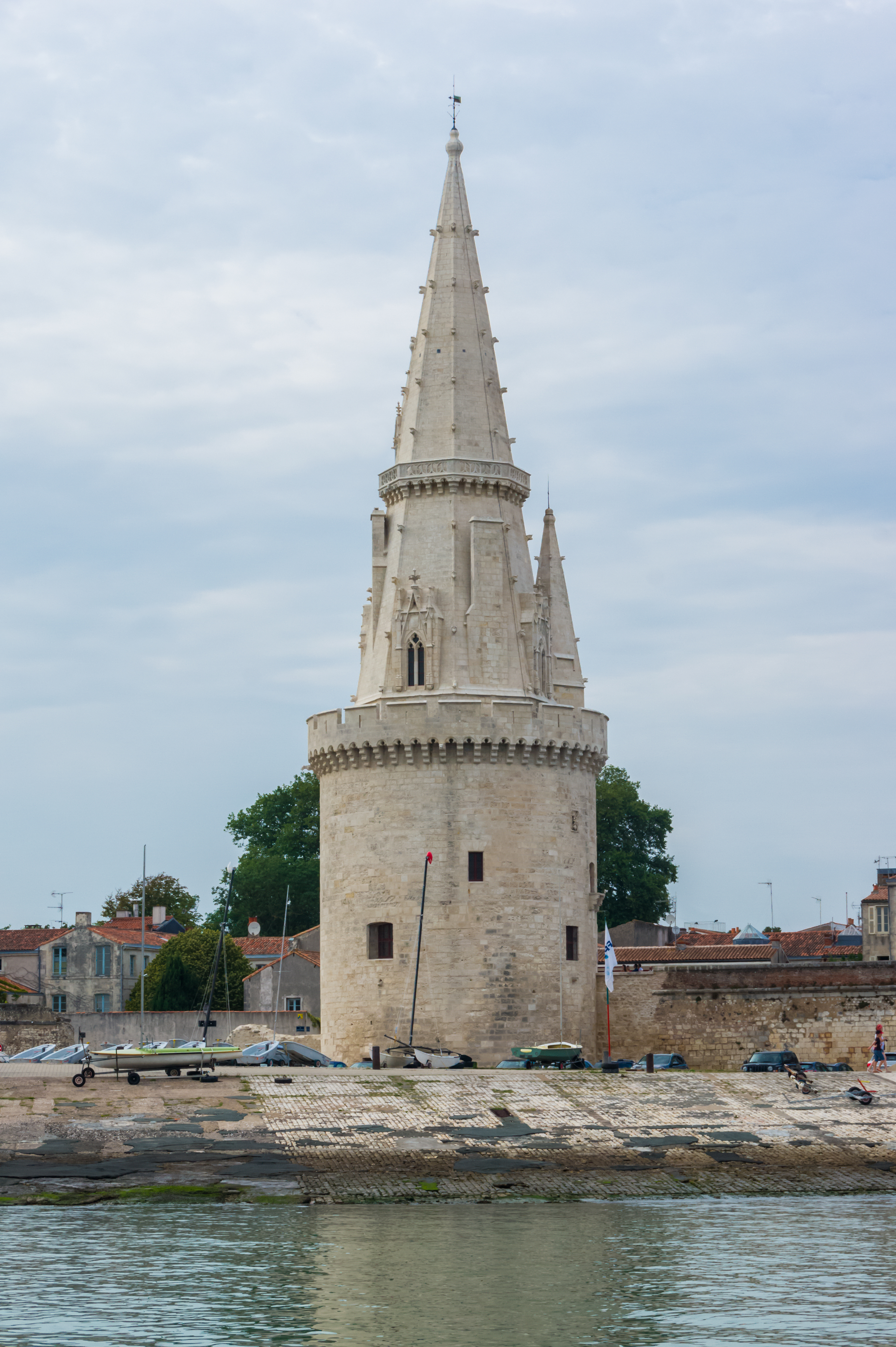
The Tour de la Lanterne

- The Hôtel de Ville on Place de l'Hôtel de Ville dates from 1298.
- The Lantern Tower dates from the 15th century.
- Saint-Louis Cathedral on Place de Verdun, dates from 1742.
- The Muséum d'Histoire naturelle de La Rochelle, which displays artifacts from naturalists and ethnographers.

== In popular culture ==
La Rochelle is the setting for the best-selling series of French language textbooks in the UK, titled Tricolore. The central character, Martine Dhome, lives with her family at the fictional address of 12, rue de la République.

Ambrette Town in Pokémon X and Y's Kalos region is inspired by La Rochelle.

== Notable people ==
=== Born in La Rochelle ===
- Antoine Albeau (born 1972), windsurfer
- François-Maurice Allotte de La Fuÿe (1844–1939), numismatist
- Matthieu Androdias (born 1990), world champion rower
- Gabrielle-Suzanne Barbot de Villeneuve, author of Beauty and the Beast
- Jacques Nicolas Billaud-Varenne, politician and revolutionary
- Aimé Bonpland, botanist
- William-Adolphe Bouguereau, painter
- Jean-Loup Chrétien, astronaut
- John Theophilus Desaguliers, physicist and mathematician
- Guy-Victor Duperre, admiral
- Jean Duvignaud, writer
- Eugène Fromentin (1820–1876), writer and painter
- Nicolas Gargot de La Rochette, governor of Placentia
- Bernard Giraudeau, actor and director
- Jean Guiton, mayor during the siege of La Rochelle
- Grégory Havret, professional golfer
- Jacques-Léopold Heugel, music publisher
- Sébastien Hurtaud, classical cellist
- Guy Laroche, fashion designer
- Samuel de Missy, abolitionist
- Fabrice Neaud, artist and cartoonist
- Pierre-Jean-Baptiste Nougaret (1742–1823), author and playwright
- Fabien Olicard (born 1982), humorist
- Victor Prevost, photographer
- Paul Ramadier, politician and member of the French Resistance
- René-Antoine Ferchault de Réaumur, scientist
- Winshluss, artist and cartoonist
- Jean-Louis Raduit de Souches, German Imperial Field Marshal
- Clément Saunier, French classical trumpeter
- Étienne Truteau, ancestor of Canadian Prime Ministers Pierre Trudeau and Justin Trudeau

=== Lived in La Rochelle ===
- Colette Besson, sprinter
- Victor Henri (1872–1940), physical chemist and physiologist
- Saint Louis de Montfort, Roman Catholic priest
- Alcide d'Orbigny (1802–1857), botanist
- Jean-Paul Sartre (1905–1980), philosopher and novelist
- Georges Simenon (1903–1989), author and novelist
- Marie Louise Trichet, nurse beatified by Pope John Paul II

== Sport ==
Stade Rochelais are a professional rugby union team in the Top 14 league. They play their home matches at Stade Marcel-Deflandre.

Since 1991 the city has annually hosted the Marathon de La Rochelle, the second-most popular marathon of France and an international-level race which featured 10,000 participants in 2010.

ES La Rochelle is the local football club.

In 2022, Stade Rochelais Basket promoted to the LNB Pro B. The team plays its home games at the Salle Gaston-Neveur.

== Twin towns – sister cities ==
La Rochelle is twinned with:

- New Rochelle, New York, United States, since 1910
- Acre, Israel, since 1972
- Lübeck, Schleswig-Holstein, Germany, since 1988
- Essaouira, Morocco, since 1999
- Santiago de Figueiró, Portugal, since 2003

== See also ==
- Communes of the Charente-Maritime department
