= Victor Prevost =

American photographer

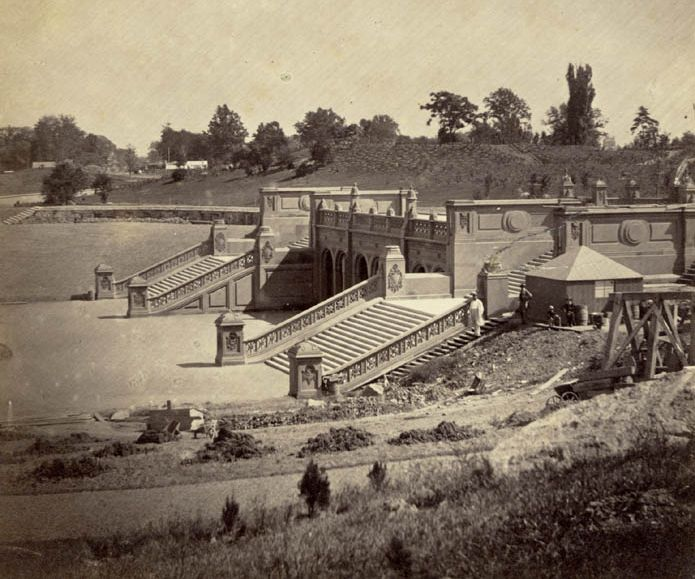
The Terrace, Central Park, NY, Albumen print, September 10, 1862.

French-born Victor Prevost (French: [pʁəvo]; c. 1820–1881) was one of the earliest photographers to work in New York City.

Prevost was born in La Rochelle, France. He studied in France under Paul Delaroche, and learned complicated photographic printing techniques from fellow student, Gustave Le Gray. However, after setting up his own studio on Broadway and Bleecker Street (he emigrated in 1850), Prevost failed to become a commercial success. After 1857, Prevost taught art and physics in various schools.

Prevost's landscapes are a subtle, and rather idiosyncratic mix of the documentary and aesthetic traditions. Aside from a show at the Metropolitan Museum of Art in 2003, his work has gone largely unknown by a contemporary public, though numerous large institutions have long collected his work.

The bulk of the artist's oeuvre resides in the George Eastman House, the Museum of the City of New York, and the New York Historical Society (though the Metropolitan Museum of Art and the Smithsonian Institution in Washington, D.C., amongst others, also own prints and negatives).
