= Lantern Tower (La Rochelle) =

Medieval tower in La Rochelle

- Tour de la Lanterne (French); Tower of the Four Sergeants (English); Garrot tower (English)
- Priest tower
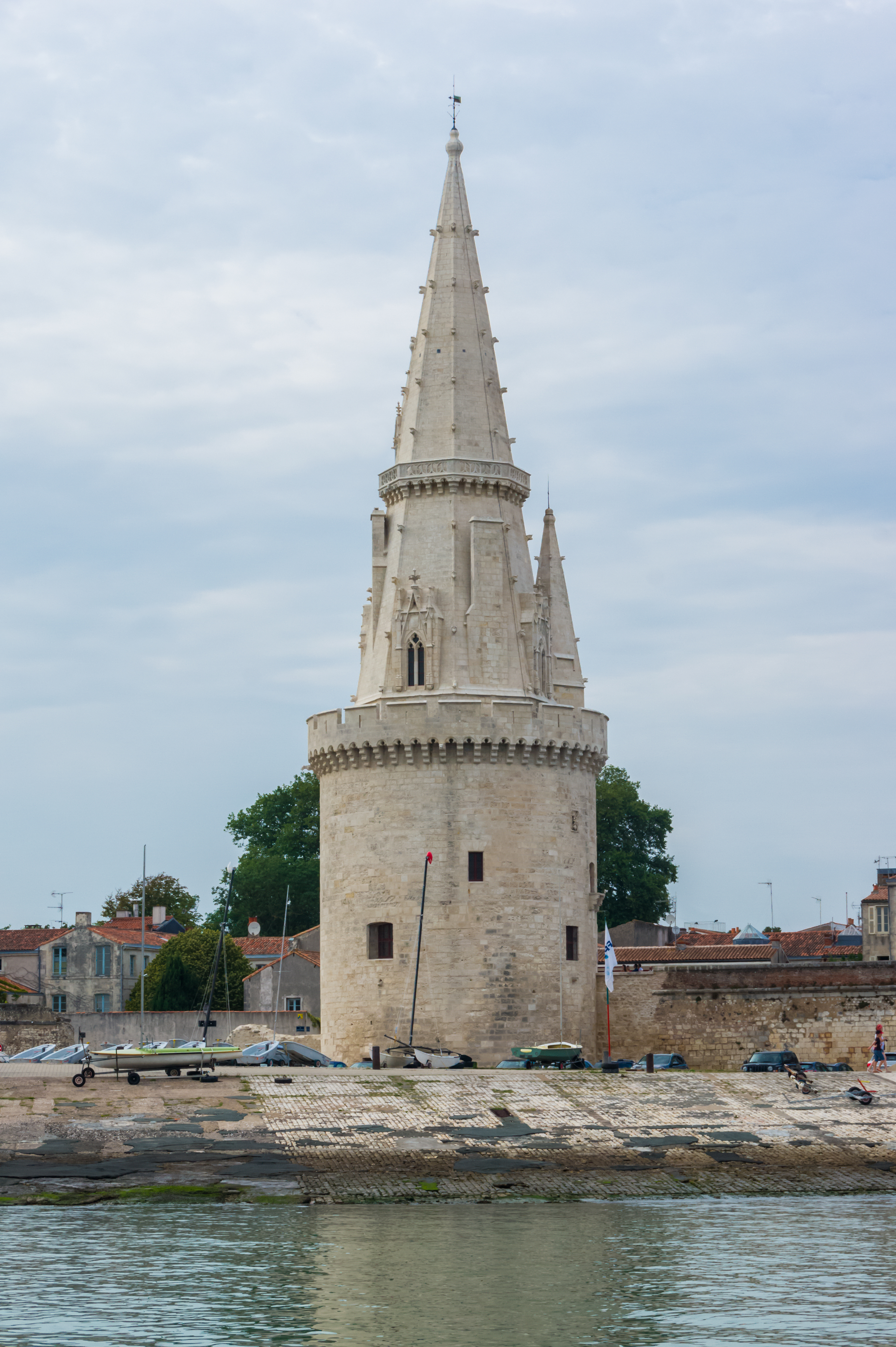
- Tour de la Lanterne
- Interactive map of Lantern Tower
- 46°09′21″N 01°09′25″W
- Location: La Rochelle, France
- Nearest city: La Rochelle

History
- Founded: 1209
- Original use: Protection of the entrance to the primitive port of La Rochelle

Site notes
- Height: 180 feet (55 m)
- Architectural style: Medieval
- Restored: 2015
- Governing body: Building managed by the CMN (Center des Monuments Nationaux)
- Owner: Government
- Website: la-rochelle.monuments-nationaux.fr

Monument historique

The Lantern Tower (French: tour de la Lanterne) is one of the three medieval historic towers in La Rochelle, Poitou-Charentes, France, which guarded the port at Aunis. The Lantern tower served as a Lighthouse and a prison throughout its history. It was also known by other names: Garrot tower, Priest tower, and Four Sergeant tower. In 1789 the French government declared it a Monument historique

== History ==
The original purpose of the tower was to watch ship traffic in the port. It also served as a lighthouse. In the 1500s the tower was used to imprison priests. It was a multi-purpose building: used both as a lighthouse and a prison. The tower was used to watch the Aunis coastline during the middle ages; and it was used to guide ships into port. Throughout its history it was also used to house prisoners: first priests, then sailors, and finally prisoners from the Wars of the Vendée.

Engraving of the 4 sergeants of La Rochelle before their execution

== See also ==
- Centre des monuments nationaux
- Vauclair castle
- La Rochelle Cathedral
