= Samuel de Missy =

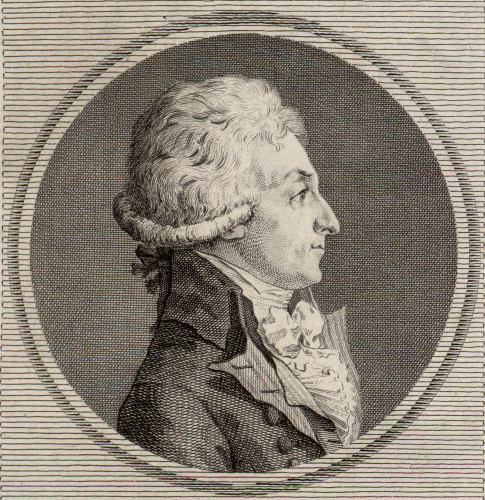
Samuel de Missy, as representative to the Assemblée Nationale in 1789. Orbigny-Bernon Museum.

Samuel de Missy (Samuel, Pierre, Joseph, David de Missy or Demissy, 30 October 1755 – 20 October 1820) was a French trader and businessman, from the city of La Rochelle, where he was born. He enriched himself by selling clothes to slaving expeditions setting off for islands such as Saint-Domingue, where La Rochelle armateurs owned plantations.

Although a participant in and beneficiary of the slave trade, de Missy disputed the legitimacy of enslavement, and joined the "Société des amis des noirs" ("Society of the friends of the Blacks"). He was much attacked for his positions in his own city, and finally had to recant his abolitionist stance for fear of damaging the economy of the city.

He became a representative at the Assemblée Nationale Constituante (Parliament, "National Constituent Assembly") in 1789.

The slave trade of La Rochelle ended with the event of the French Revolution and the war with England in the 1790s, the last La Rochelle slave ship, the Saint-Jacques was captured in 1793 in the Gulf of Guinea. With the Law of 4 February 1794, the National Convention effectively freed all colonial slaves.

The Collège Samuel de Missy in La Rochelle is named after him.
