= François-Maurice Allotte de La Fuÿe =

French military officer (1844–1939)

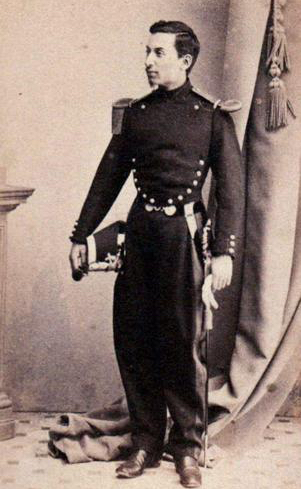
François-Maurice Allotte de La Fuÿe

Francois-Maurice Allotte de La Fuye (6 November 1844, La Rochelle – 13 February 1939, Versailles) was a French military officer, archaeologist and numismatist.

From 1863 to 1865 he was a student at the École Polytechnique in Paris and afterwards was associated with the Ecole imperiale d’application de l’artillerie et du genie (Imperial school of artillery application and engineering) in Metz. In 1886/87 he was in charge of construction of the military barracks at Tébessa, Algeria. Several years later, he was appointed commandant of the School of Engineering in Grenoble. From 1897 to 1904 he was a member of the French archaeological delegation in Persia (Susa).

From 1914 to 1936 he was a correspondent member of the Académie des Inscriptions et Belles-Lettres. In 1933 he was named president of the Société française de numismatique.

== Publications ==
- Les mosaïques de Tébessa. Mosaïque de l'Oued–Athmenia, 1888
- Le Trésor de Sainte–Blandine, 1891
- Mémoire sur l'emploi des appareils photographiques pour les observations à grande et à petite distance, 1892 (Lire en ligne)
- La dynastie des Kamnaskirès, 1902
- Nouveau classement des monnaies arsacides d'après le catalogue du British Museum, 1904
- Monnaies arsacides surfrappées, 1904
- Monnaies de l'Élymäide, 1904
- Monnaies de l'Élymaïde, 1905
- Monnaies arsacides de la collection Petrowicz, 1905
- Numismatique de la Perside, 1906
- Étude sur la numismatique de la Perside, 1906
- Un document de comptabilité de l'époque d'Ouroukagina, roi de Lagach, 1906
- Les sceaux de Lougalanda, patési de Lagash (Sirpourla) et de sa femme Barnamtarra, 1907
- Observations sur la numismatique de la Perside, 1907
- Documents présargoniques, 1908-1920
- En-Gil-Sa, patési de Lagaš, 1909
- Mesures de capacité dans les textes archaïques de Telloh, 1909
- Le gour saggal et ses subdivisions : d'après les documents présargoniques de Lagǎs, 1909
- En-e-tar-zi patési de Lagaš, 1909
- Les monnaies incertaines de la Sogdiane et des contrées voisines, 1910
- Correspondance sumérologique, 1913
- Une Monnaie incertaine au nom d'Artavasde, 1914
- Le mystère de talismans musulmans, 1915
- Un dirham talismanique musulman, 1915
- Un cadastre de Djokha, 1915
- Un cadastre de Djokha, 1915
- Mesures agraires et formules d'arpentage à l'époque présargonique, 1915
- Les monnaies de l’Élymaïde. Modifications au classement proposé en 1907, 1919
- Compte de gestion d'un Entrepôt de Matériaux à Tummaal, 1919
- L'iconographie de Moïse sur quelques médailles modernes à légendes hébraïques, 1919
- Le sceau d'Ur-é-innanna sur un tronc de cône étiquette : étude comparative des sceaux de cette époque, 1920
- Les Us-Ku dans les textes archaïques de Lagas, 1921
- Alphabet araméen-sogdien ?, 1921
- La coupe magique de Hit sur l'Euphrate décorée d'écritures manichéennes et d'exorcismes surprenants, 1924
- Une coupe magique en écriture manichéenne, 1924
- Jacques de Morgan, 1924
- Fragments de vase avec inscription provenant de Téhéran, 1925
- Monnaie inédite de Xerxès roi d'Arsamosate provenant des fouilles de Suse, 1927
- Imitations de la drachme de Varahran V frappée à Merv, 1927
- Une monnaie musulmane d'un type inédit trouvée à Suse, 1928
- Mission en Susiane, 1928
- Numismatique t.XX, Mission archéologique de Perse, 1928
- Deux inscriptions inédites d'Oumma relatives à la navigation : Le sens du mot KAR dans les comptes-rendus de Larsa, 1928
- Le pentagramme pythagoricien. Sa diffusion, son emploi dans la syllabaire cunéiforme, 1934
- Archéologie, métrologie et numismatique susiennes, 1934
- Le pentagramme pythagoricien : Sa diffusion, son emploi dans le syllabaire cunéiforme, 1934
- Inventaire des monnaies trouvées à Suse, Mission archéologique de Perse, campagnes de fouilles 1925,1926,1927, 1928, t. XX et t. XXV, 1935
