= Guillaume de Montmirail =

Guillaume de Montmirail was a French nobleman, who was elected the first mayor of La Rochelle in 1199. He was also the first mayor of French history. His nomination was the result of the right of La Rochelle to establish itself as a commune, granted by Guillaume X, Duke of Aquitaine, and upheld by his daughter Eleanor of Aquitaine. Guillaume was assisted in his responsibilities by 24 municipal magistrates, and 75 notables who had jurisdiction over the inhabitants. Under the communal charter, the city had the right to mint its own coins, and to operate some businesses free of royal taxes, dispositions which would favour the development of the entrepreneurial middle-class (bourgeoisie).

Guillaume de Montmirail is also recorded as being lord of the territory of Boscodon.
