= Centre des monuments nationaux =

French heritage agency

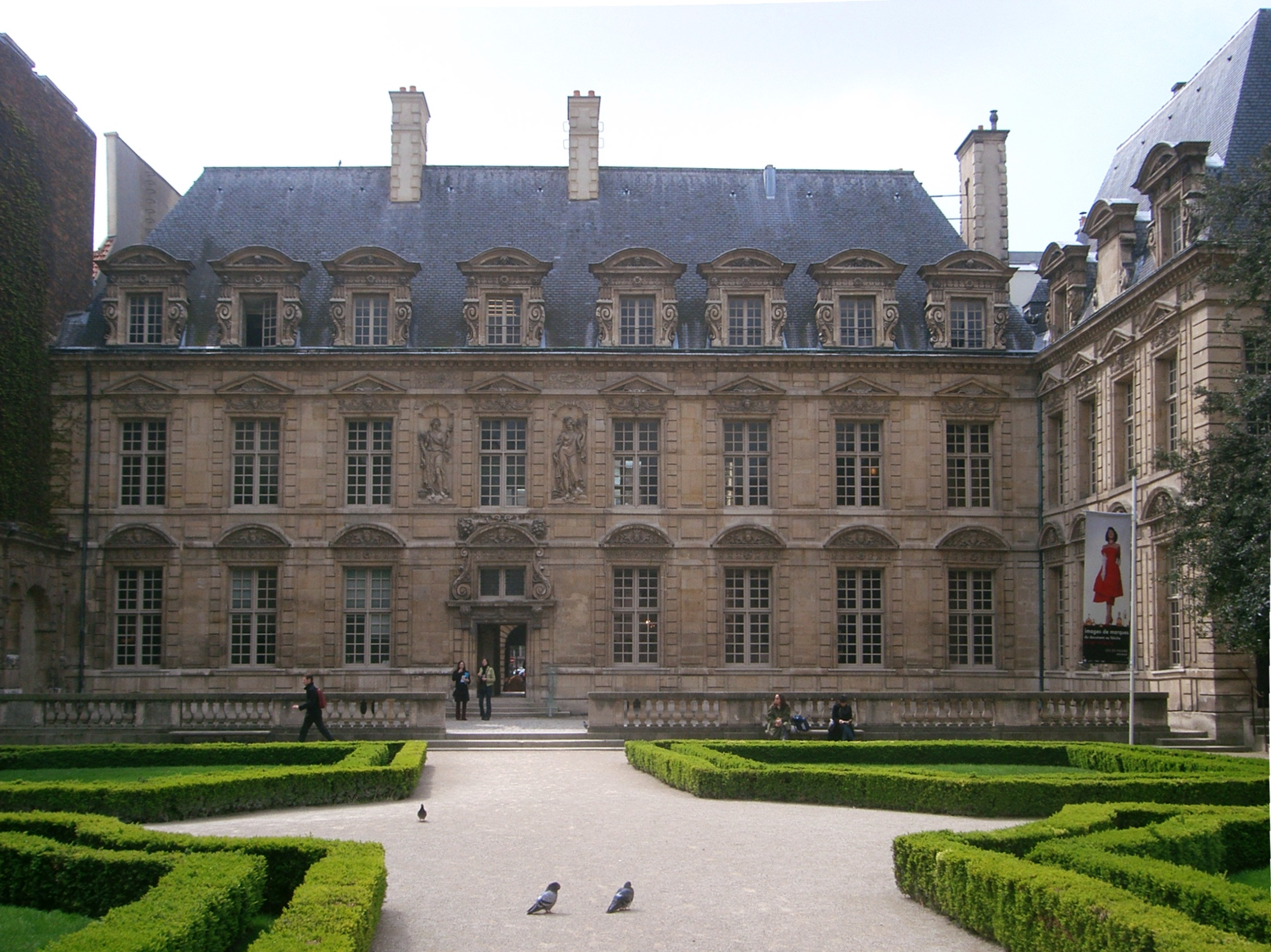
The Hôtel de Sully in Paris, headquarters of the Centre des monuments nationaux

The Centre des monuments nationaux (French pronunciation: [sɑ̃tʁ(ə) de mɔnymɑ̃ nasjɔno], CMN; 'National monuments centre') is a French government body (établissement public à caractère administratif) which conserves, restores and manages historic buildings and sites that are the property of the French state. It is run by the Ministry of Culture.

The CMN is responsible for the upkeep of around 85 monuments, ranging from the prehistoric megaliths at Carnac, medieval fortifications such as the towers at La Rochelle, and Renaissance châteaux such as Azay-le-Rideau, to Le Corbusier's Villa Savoye. The CMN is also responsible for making these monuments accessible to the public, and promoting understanding of the heritage they represent through publishing books and guides, under the imprint Éditions du patrimoine.

In 2008, the CMN sites had a total of nearly 8.5 million visitors. The CMN had an annual budget of €120 million in 2009, which was mainly derived from its own sales, as well as from donations and a subsidy from the Ministry of Culture. The organisation is based at the Hôtel de Sully on rue Saint-Antoine in Paris.

== List of monuments ==
Monument name	Type	Location	Department	Region
Aigues-Mortes city walls	Fortifications	Aigues-Mortes	Gard	Languedoc-Roussillon
Amiens Cathedral, towers	Cathedral	Amiens	Somme	Picardy
Château d'Angers	Château	Angers	Maine-et-Loire	Pays de la Loire
Arc de Triomphe	Triumphal arch	Paris	Paris	Île-de-France
Château d'Assier	Château	Assier	Lot	Midi-Pyrénées
Château d'Aulteribe	Château	Sermentizon	Puy-de-Dôme	Auvergne
Château d'Azay-le-Rideau	Château	Azay-le-Rideau	Indre-et-Loire	Centre-Val de Loire
Barnenez	Neolithic cairn	Plouezoc'h	Finistère	Brittany
Beaulieu-en-Rouergue Abbey	Monastery	Ginals	Tarn-et-Garonne	Midi-Pyrénées
Bec Abbey	Monastery	Le Bec Hellouin	Eure	Upper Normandy
Besançon Cathedral and astronomical clock	Cathedral	Besançon	Doubs	Franche-Comté
Hôtel de Béthune-Sully	House	Paris	Paris	Île-de-France
Château de Bouges	Château	Bouges-le-Château	Indre	Centre-Val de Loire
Palais Jacques Coeur	Palace	Bourges	Cher	Centre-Val de Loire
Bourges Cathedral, tower and crypt	Cathedral	Bourges	Cher	Centre-Val de Loire
Brou Monastery	Monastery	Bourg-en-Bresse	Ain	Rhône-Alpes
Château de Bussy-Rabutin	Château	Bussy-le-Grand	Côte-d'Or	Burgundy
Château de Cadillac	Château	Cadillac	Gironde	Aquitaine
Carcassonne, citadel and castle	Fortifications	Carcassonne	Aude	Languedoc-Roussillon
Carnac stones	Megalithic site	Carnac	Morbihan	Brittany
Château de Carrouges	Château	Carrouges	Orne	Lower Normandy
Château de Castelnau-Bretenoux	Château	Prudhomat	Lot	Midi-Pyrénées
Château de Champs-sur-Marne	Château	Champs-sur-Marne	Seine-et-Marne	Île-de-France
Chapelle Expiatoire	Church	Paris	Paris	Île-de-France
Château de Chareil-Cintrat	Château	Chareil-Cintrat	Allier	Auvergne
Charroux Abbey	Monastery	Charroux	Vienne	Poitou-Charentes
Chartres Cathedral, towers and treasure house	Cathedral	Chartres	Eure-et-Loir	Centre-Val de Loire
Château de Châteaudun	Château	Châteaudun	Eure-et-Loir	Centre-Val de Loire
Cluny Abbey	Monastery	Cluny	Saône-et-Loire	Burgundy
Conciergerie	Palace	Paris	Paris	Île-de-France
Château de Coucy	Château	Coucy-le-Château-Auffrique	Aisne	Picardy
Oppidum d'Ensérune	Gallo-Roman site	Nissan-lez-Enserune	Hérault	Languedoc-Roussillon
Les Eyzies-de-Tayac (various sites including caves at Font-de-Gaume and Teyjat)	Neolithic sites	Les Eyzies-de-Tayac-Sireuil	Dordogne	Aquitaine
Château de Voltaire	Château	Ferney-Voltaire	Ain	Rhône-Alpes
Fontevraud Abbey	Monastery	Chinon	Maine-et-Loire	Pays de la Loire
Château de Fougères-sur-Bièvre	Château	Fougères-sur-Bièvre	Loir-et-Cher	Centre-Val de Loire
Fréjus Cathedral, cloister	Cathedral	Fréjus	Var	Provence-Alpes-Côte d'Azur
Maison de Georges Clemenceau	House	Saint-Vincent-sur-Jard	Vendée	Pays de la Loire
Glanum	Roman site	Saint-Rémy-de-Provence	Bouches-du-Rhône	Provence-Alpes-Côte d'Azur
Château de Gramont	Château	Gramont	Tarn-et-Garonne	Midi-Pyrénées
Château d'If	Château	Marseille	Bouches-du-Rhône	Provence-Alpes-Côte d'Azur
Maison des Jardies	House	Sèvres	Hauts-de-Seine	Île-de-France
Domaine national de Jossigny	Château	Jossigny	Seine-et-Marne	Île-de-France
Château de La Motte-Tilly	Château	La Motte-Tilly	Aube	Champagne-Ardenne
Lantern Tower	Fortifications	La Rochelle	Charente-Maritime	Poitou-Charentes
Saint Nicolas Tower	Fortifications	La Rochelle	Charente-Maritime	Poitou-Charentes
The Chain Tower	Fortifications	La Rochelle	Charente-Maritime	Poitou-Charentes
Sauve-Majeure Abbey	Monastery	La Sauve	Gironde	Aquitaine
Trophy of Augustus	Roman site	La Turbie	Alpes-Maritimes	Provence-Alpes-Côte d'Azur
Locmariaquer megaliths	Megalithic site	Locmariaquer	Morbihan	Brittany
Château de Maisons	Château	Maisons-Laffitte	Yvelines	Île-de-France
Place forte de Mont-Dauphin	Fortifications	Mont-Dauphin	Hautes-Alpes	Provence-Alpes-Côte d'Azur
Mont-Saint-Michel Abbey	Monastery	Mont Saint-Michel	Manche	Lower Normandy
Château de Montal	Château	Saint-Jean-Lespinasse	Lot	Midi-Pyrénées
Montcaret Villa	Gallo-Roman site	Montcaret	Dordogne	Aquitaine
Montmajour Abbey	Monastery	Arles	Bouches-du-Rhône	Provence-Alpes-Côte d'Azur
Montmaurin Villa	Gallo-Roman site	Montmaurin	Haute-Garonne	Midi-Pyrénées
Maison de George Sand	House	Nohant-Vic	Indre	Centre-Val de Loire
Notre-Dame de Paris, towers	Cathedral	Paris	Paris	Île-de-France
Château d'Oiron	Château	Oiron	Deux-Sèvres	Poitou-Charentes
Pair-non-Pair cave	Neolithic site	Prignac-et-Marcamps	Gironde	Aquitaine
Palais-Royal	Palace	Paris	Paris	Île-de-France
Panthéon	Church	Paris	Paris	Île-de-France
Tour Pey-Berland	Tower	Bordeaux	Gironde	Aquitaine
Château de Pierrefonds	Château	Pierrefonds	Oise	Picardy
Musée des Plans-Reliefs	Museum	Paris	Paris	Île-de-France
Puy-en-Velay Cathedral, cloister	Cathedral	Le Puy-en-Velay	Haute-Loire	Auvergne
Château de Puyguilhem	Château	Villars	Dordogne	Aquitaine
Château de Rambouillet	Château	Rambouillet	Yvelines	Île-de-France
Queen's Dairy and Shell Cottage, Château de Rambouillet	Ornamental buildings	Rambouillet	Yvelines	Île-de-France
Palace of Tau	Palace	Rheims	Marne	Champagne-Ardenne
Reims Cathedral, towers	Cathedral	Rheims	Marne	Champagne-Ardenne
Domaine national de Saint-Cloud	Château and park	Saint-Cloud	Hauts-de-Seine	Île-de-France
Basilica of St Denis	Cathedral	Saint-Denis	Seine-Saint-Denis	Île-de-France
Sainte-Chapelle	Church	Paris	Paris	Île-de-France
Fort de Salses	Fortifications	Salses-le-Château	Pyrénées-Orientales	Languedoc-Roussillon
Sanxay	Gallo-Roman site	Sanxay	Vienne	Poitou-Charentes
Saorge Monastery	Monastery	Saorge	Alpes-Maritimes	Provence-Alpes-Côte d'Azur
Château de Talcy	Château	Talcy	Loir-et-Cher	Centre-Val de Loire
Thoronet Abbey	Monastery	Draguignan	Var	Provence-Alpes-Côte d'Azur
Tours Cathedral, Cloître de la Psalette	Cathedral	Tours	Indre-et-Loire	Centre-Val de Loire
Maison d'Ernest Renan	House	Tréguier	Côtes-d'Armor	Brittany
Villa Savoye	House	Poissy	Yvelines	Île-de-France
Château de Villeneuve-Lembron	Château	Saint-Germain-Lembron	Puy-de-Dôme	Auvergne
Fort Saint-André	Fortifications	Villeneuve-lès-Avignon	Gard	Languedoc-Roussillon
Château de Vincennes	Château	Vincennes	Val-de-Marne	Île-de-France
Column of the Grande Armée	Memorial column	Wimille	Pas-de-Calais	Nord-Pas-de-Calais
Vénus de Quinipily	Statue	Baud	Morbihan	Brittany
