= The Chain Tower =

- La tour de la Chaîne (French)
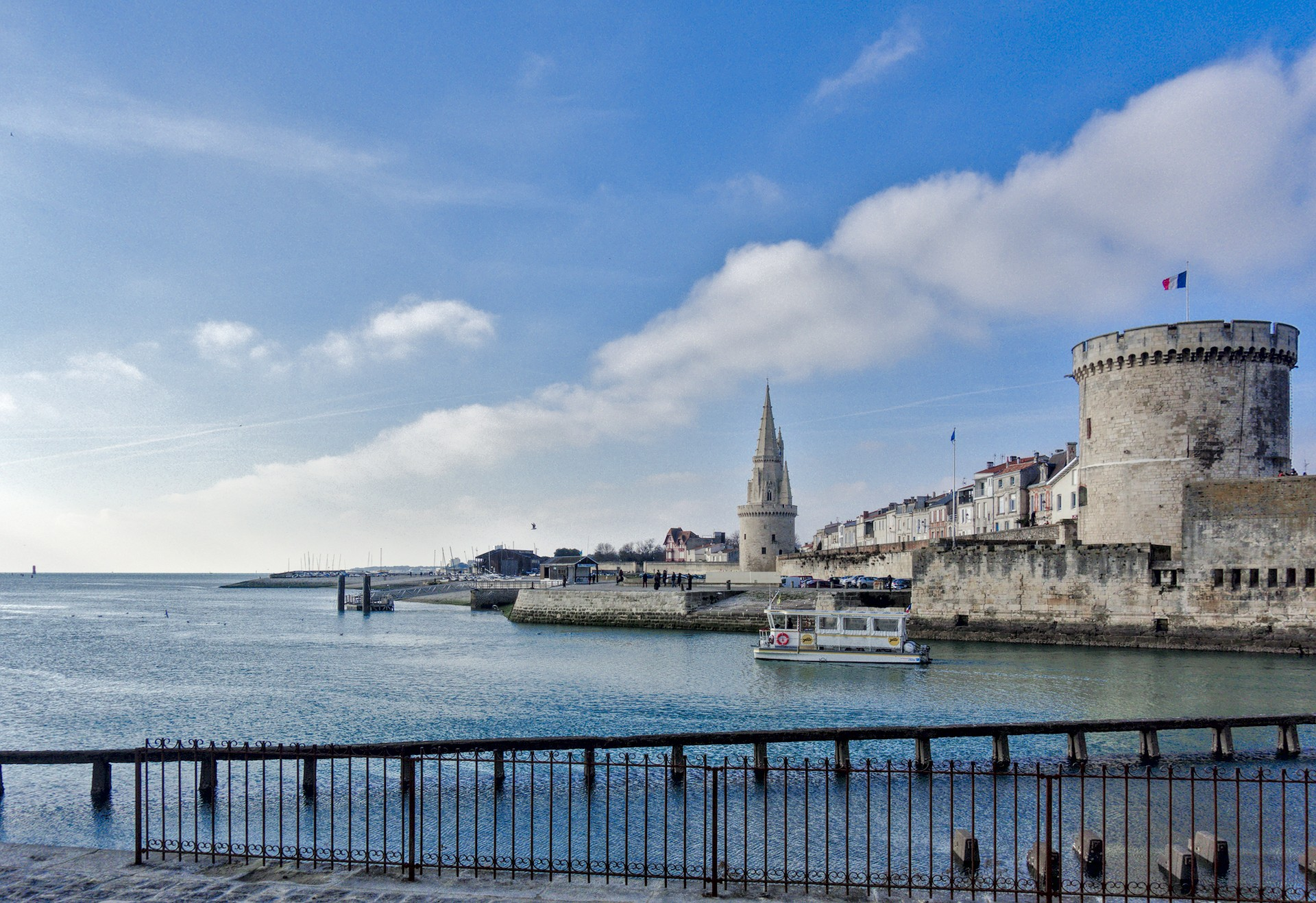
- The chain Tower
- Interactive map of The Chain Tower
- 46°09′21″N 01°09′25″W
- Location: La Rochelle, France
- Nearest city: La Rochelle

History
- Original use: Gateway to the Old Port of La Rochelle

Site notes
- Height: 138 feet (42 m)
- Architectural style: Medieval
- Governing body: Building managed by the CMN (Center des Monuments Nationaux)
- Owner: Government
- Website: la-rochelle.monuments-nationaux.fr

Monument historique

The Chain Tower (1384) (French:La tour de la Chaîne) along with the Lantern tower and the Saint Nicolas Tower, is one of the three medieval towers guarding the port in La Rochelle, France. It is called the Chain tower because an actual chain was stretched across the port entrance from this building. In 1879 the French government classified it as a Monument historique (MH).

== History ==
This tower along with the Saint Nicolas Tower stood at the entryway to the Port of La Rochelle. This tower got its name because, at various points in history, a chain was stretched between the two structures to prevent ships from passing through. Throughout history the building was also used to store gunpowder. The tower has not changed much since the 14th century.

== See also ==
- Centre des monuments nationaux
- Vauclair castle
- La Rochelle Cathedral

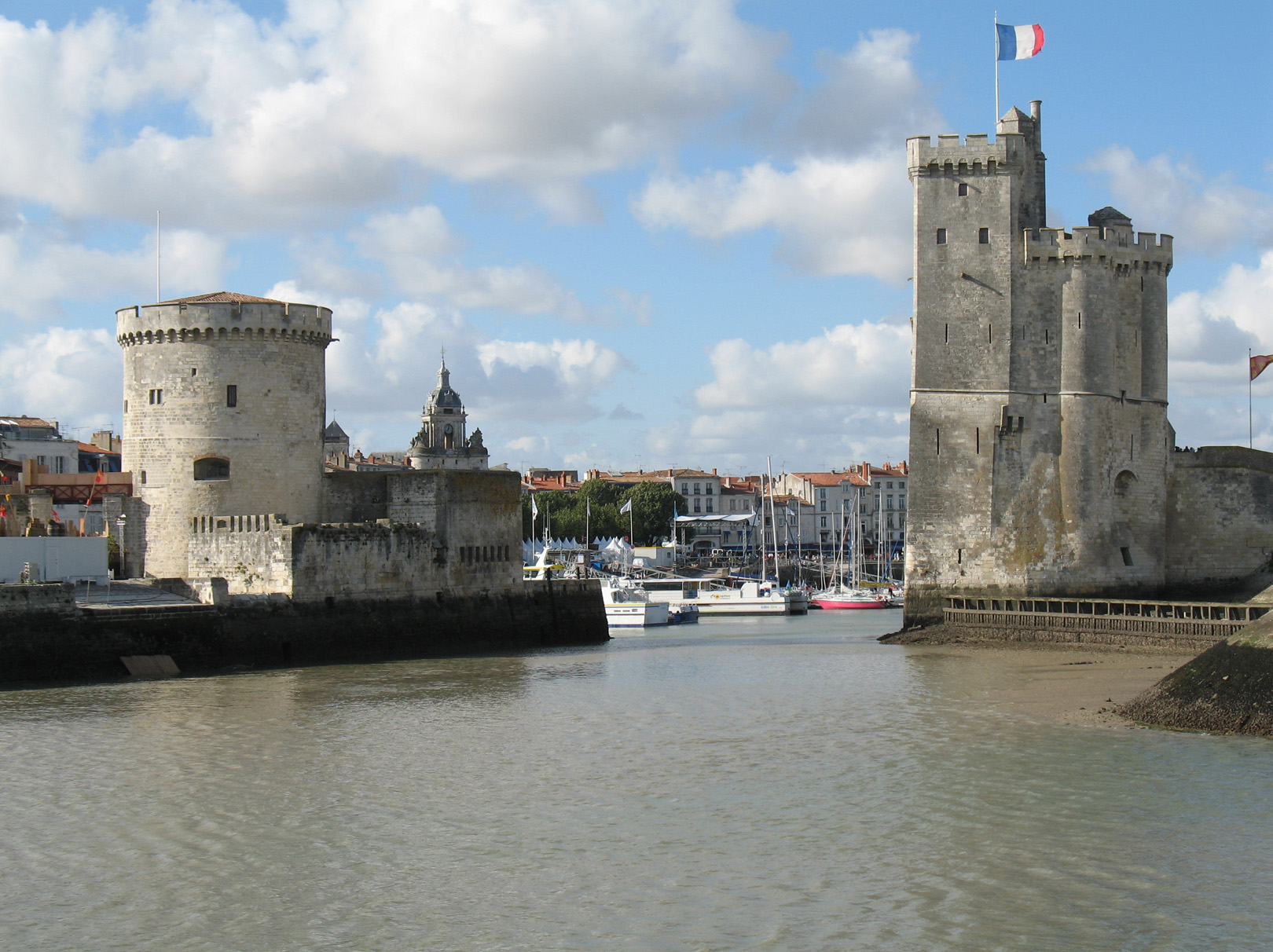
The entrance of the Old Port of La Rochelle The Chain Tower on the left, Saint Nicolas Tower on the right.
