= Saint Nicolas Tower =

- La tour Saint-Nicolas (French)
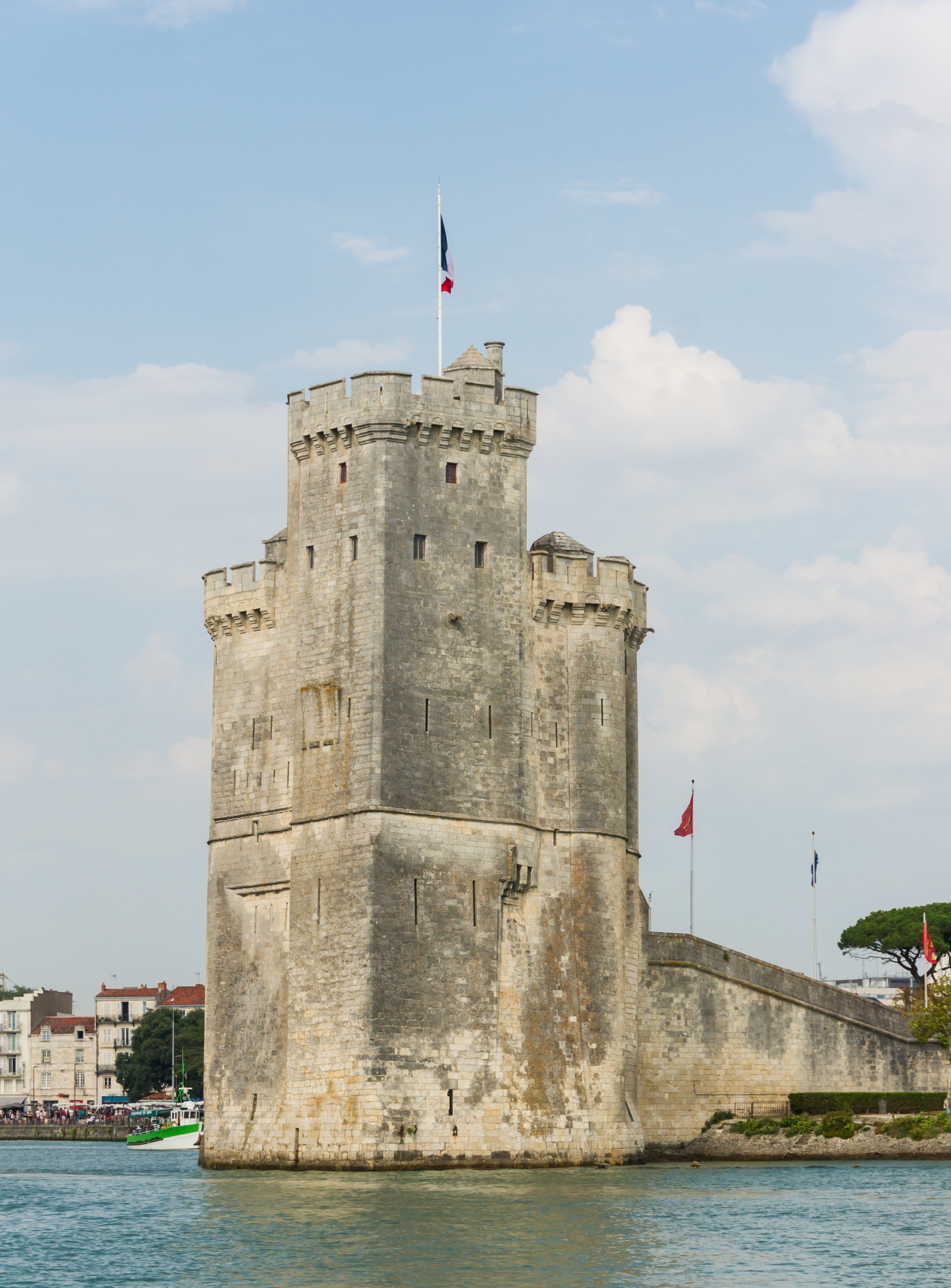
- Saint Nicolas Tower
- Interactive map of Saint Nicolas Tower
- 46°09′21″N 01°09′25″W
- Location: La Rochelle, France
- Nearest city: La Rochelle

History
- Original use: Gateway to the Old Port of La Rochelle

Site notes
- Height: 138 feet (42 m)
- Architectural style: Medieval
- Governing body: Building managed by the CMN (Center des Monuments Nationaux)
- Owner: Government
- Website: la-rochelle.monuments-nationaux.fr

Monument historique

Saint Nicolas Tower (1384) along with the Lantern tower and the Chain tower, is one of the three medieval towers guarding the port in La Rochelle, France. In 1879 the French government classified it as a Monument historique (MH).

== History ==
The Saint Nicolas Tower was named after the patron saint of sailors, This tower along with the Chain Tower (La tour de la Chaîne) stood at the entryway to the Port of La Rochelle. At times throughout history a chain was stretched between the two buildings to stop ships from entering. the building was also used as a prison throughout its history. The tower looks as it did in the 1400s.

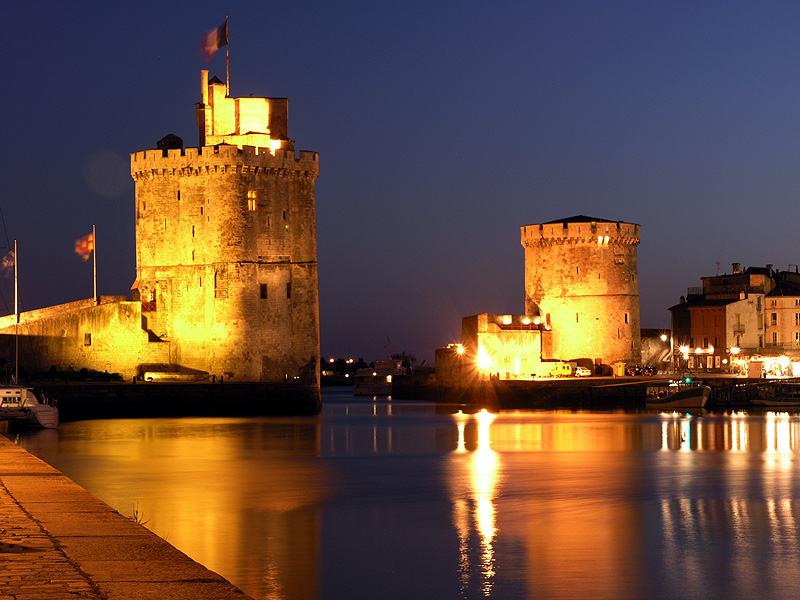
Night photo: Saint Nicolas Tower left, Chain Tower right

== See also ==
- Centre des monuments nationaux
- Vauclair castle
- La Rochelle Cathedral
