= Château d'Assier =

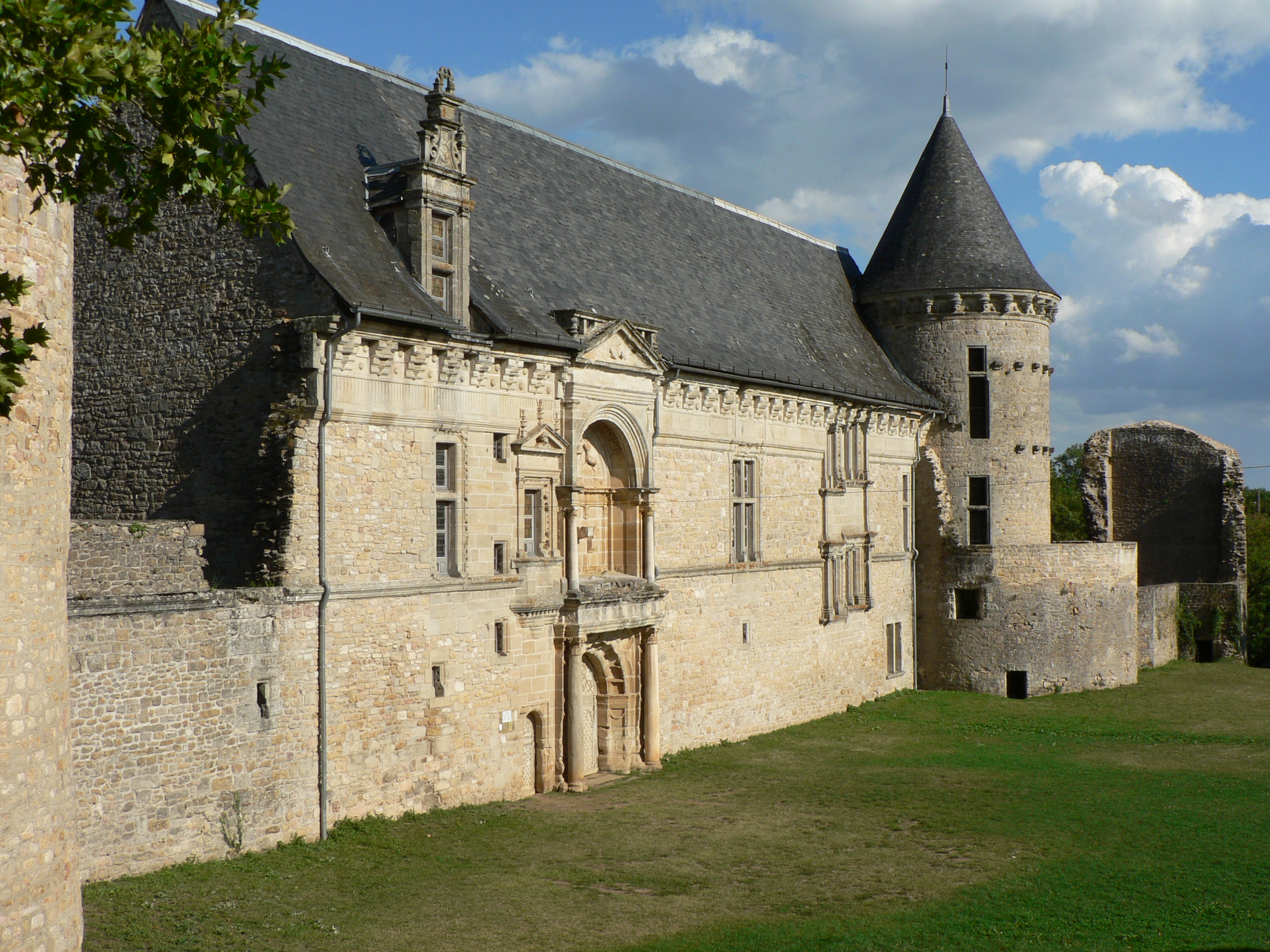
- West wing of Château d'Assier

- Location within France

General information
- Type: Château
- Architectural style: French Renaissance
- Coordinates: 44.675°N 1.8786°E
- Construction started: 1518
- Completed: 1535
- Client: Jacques Galiot de Genouillac
- Owner: Centre des monuments nationaux

Website
- https://www.chateau-assier.fr/en/

The Château d'Assier is located in Assier, in the Lot department of the Occitanie region of south-west France. It is an example of the diffusion of Renaissance château architecture from the Loire Valley into other parts of France.

== History ==
Built between 1518 and 1535, the château was commissioned by Jacques Galiot de Genouillac (1465–1546), Grand Squire of France under King François I. The château was designed as a large quadrangle, 40 metres (130 ft) on each side, flanked by massive round towers at each corner, capped with ogival domes.

Jeanne, only heiress of Galiot de Genouillac, married Charles de Crussol, vicomte d'Uzès (1483–1546). In 1768, their descendant, the duc d'Uzès, sold most of the château to demolition contractors, who pulled down the buildings and sold the materials. The duke retained the west wing for agricultural uses. In spite of the classification of the building as a historic monument, by Prosper Mérimée in 1841, the agricultural use continued until the whole of the surviving building was acquired by the French state in 1934. In 1901, it was registered as a monument historique. The building is now in the care of the Centre des monuments nationaux, and is open to the public.

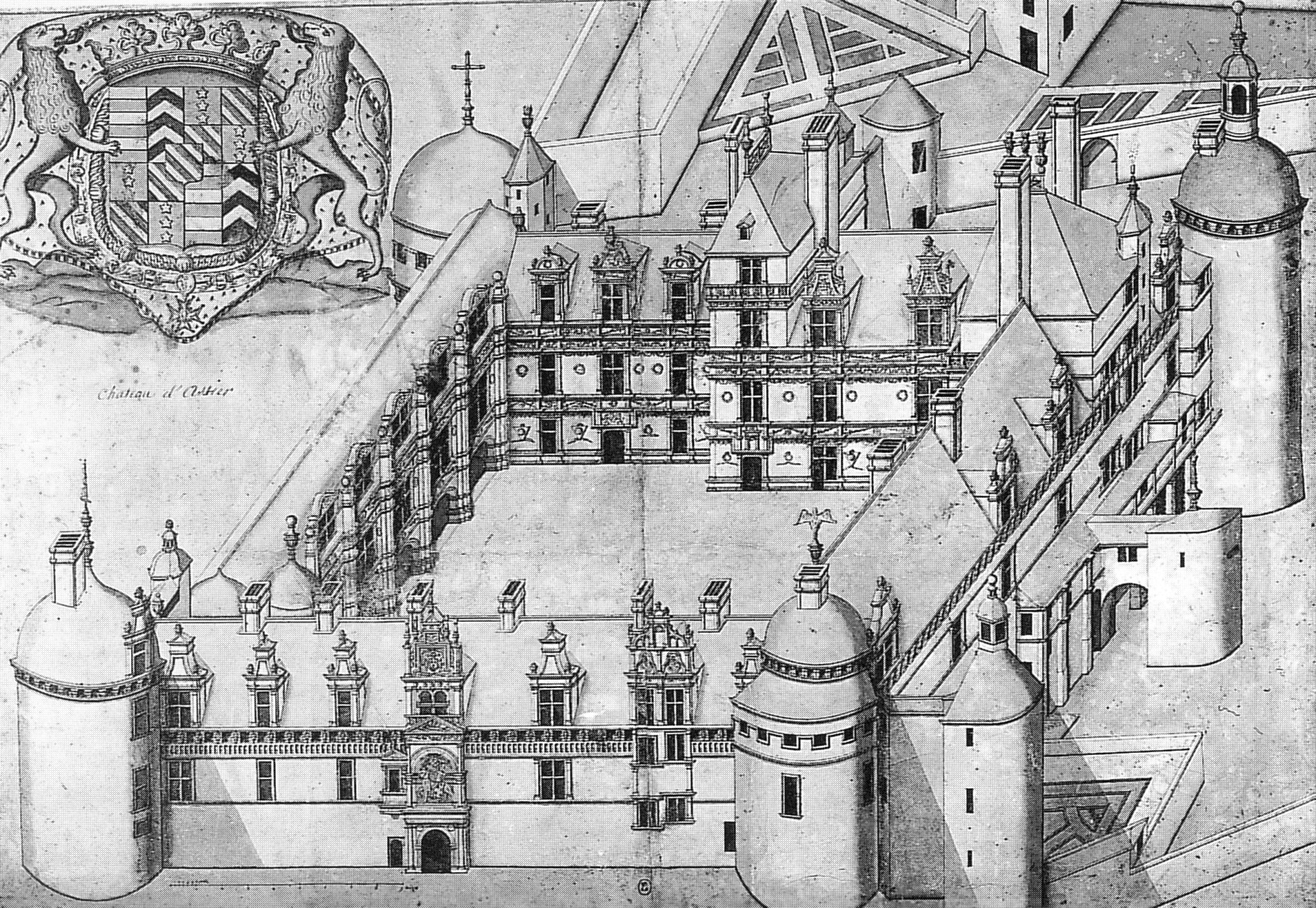
Château d'Assier as built

== Architecture ==
The remaining west wing retains its pedimented gateway, which sheltered, in a niche at first floor level, an equestrian statue of Galiot de Genouillac. The courtyard frontage is decorated with two broad friezes, richly carved with emblems referring to the military achievements of Galiot de Genouillac, and to the legend of Hercules. Inside, a grand staircase, vaulted on intersecting ribs, leads up to a marble pillar, decorated with "grotesques", which is thought to be the work of Jean Goujon or one of his pupils. The interior comprises a series of vaulted rooms, decorated with martial trophies, and containing a small museum. The external and interior decoration is typical of the French Renaissance style, with Classical orders (ionic, doric, Corinthian), scenes from the legend of Hercules, such as the Lernaean Hydra and the Nemean lion, as well as more personal motifs, such as the cannons, swords, the collar of the Order of Saint Michael.

A tower-shaped dovecote, dating to 1537, contains 2,500 terracotta nesting boxes, which were accessed by a rotating ladder. Now private property, the dovecote was registered as a monument historique on 21 November 2005. The mill was built on the site of a medieval mill, and was rebuilt several times.
