= Château de Bussy-Rabutin =

Castle in France

Coordinates: 47°33′41″N 4°31′25″E

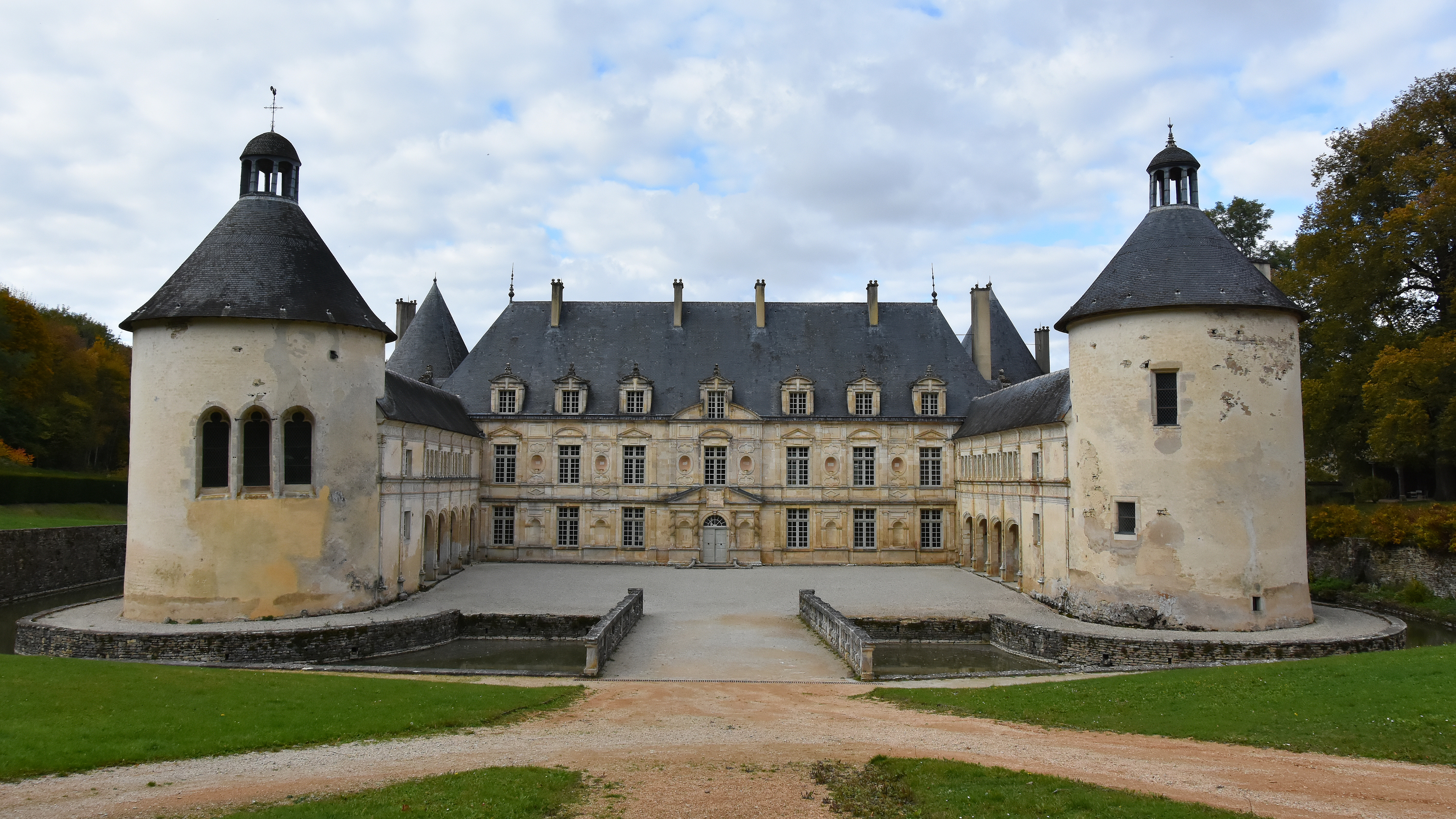
Main façade, with the chapel on the left

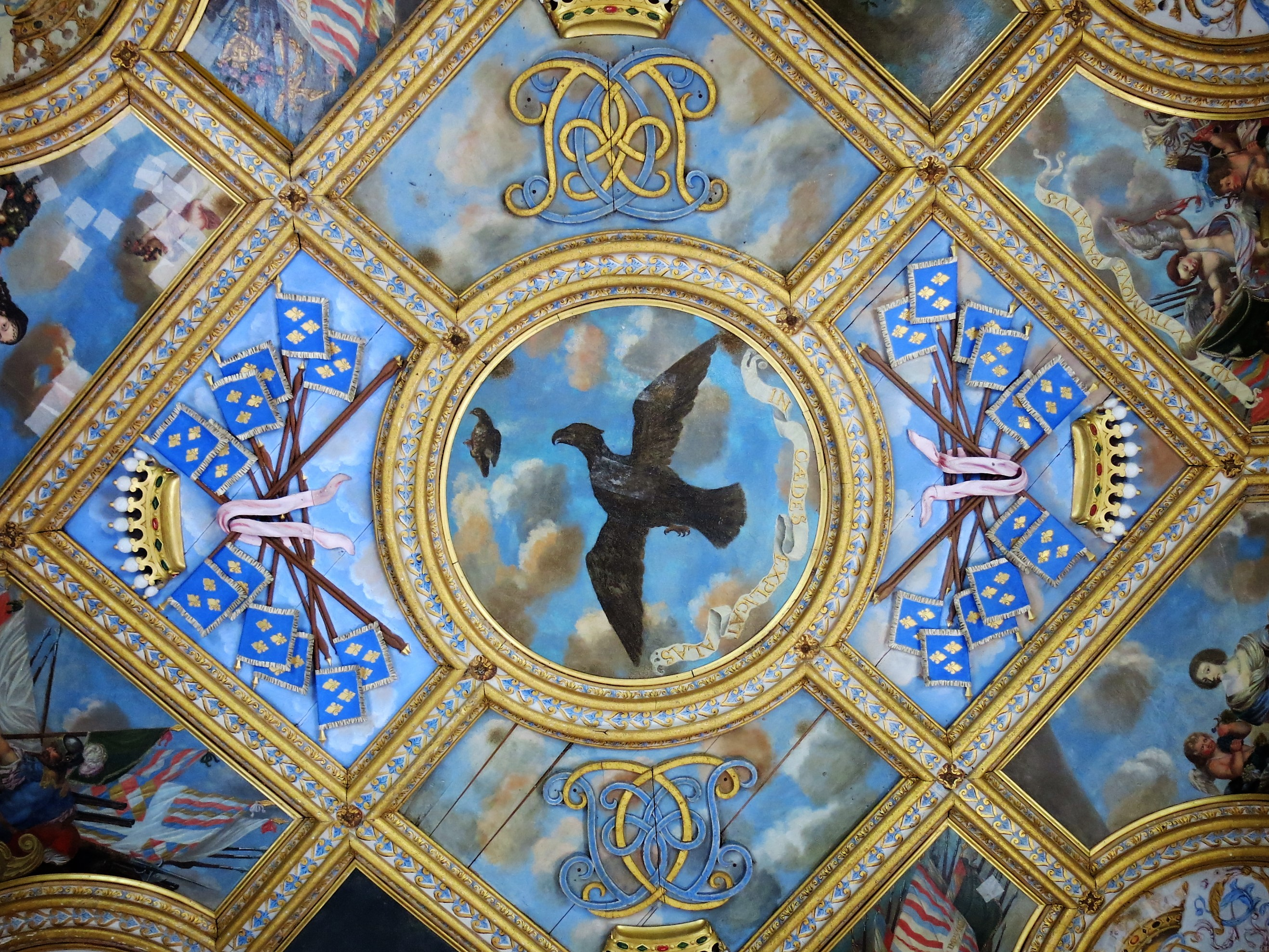
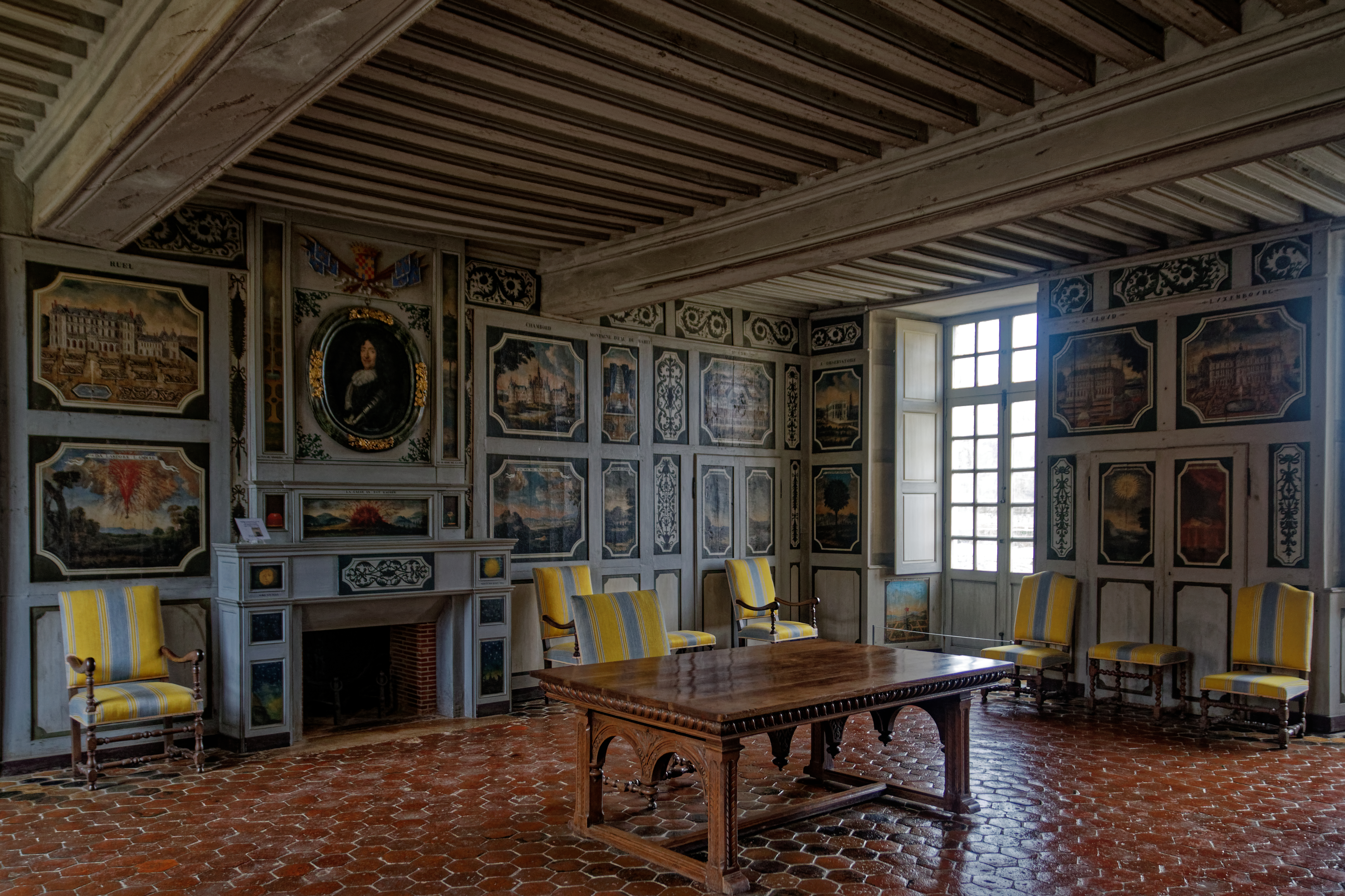
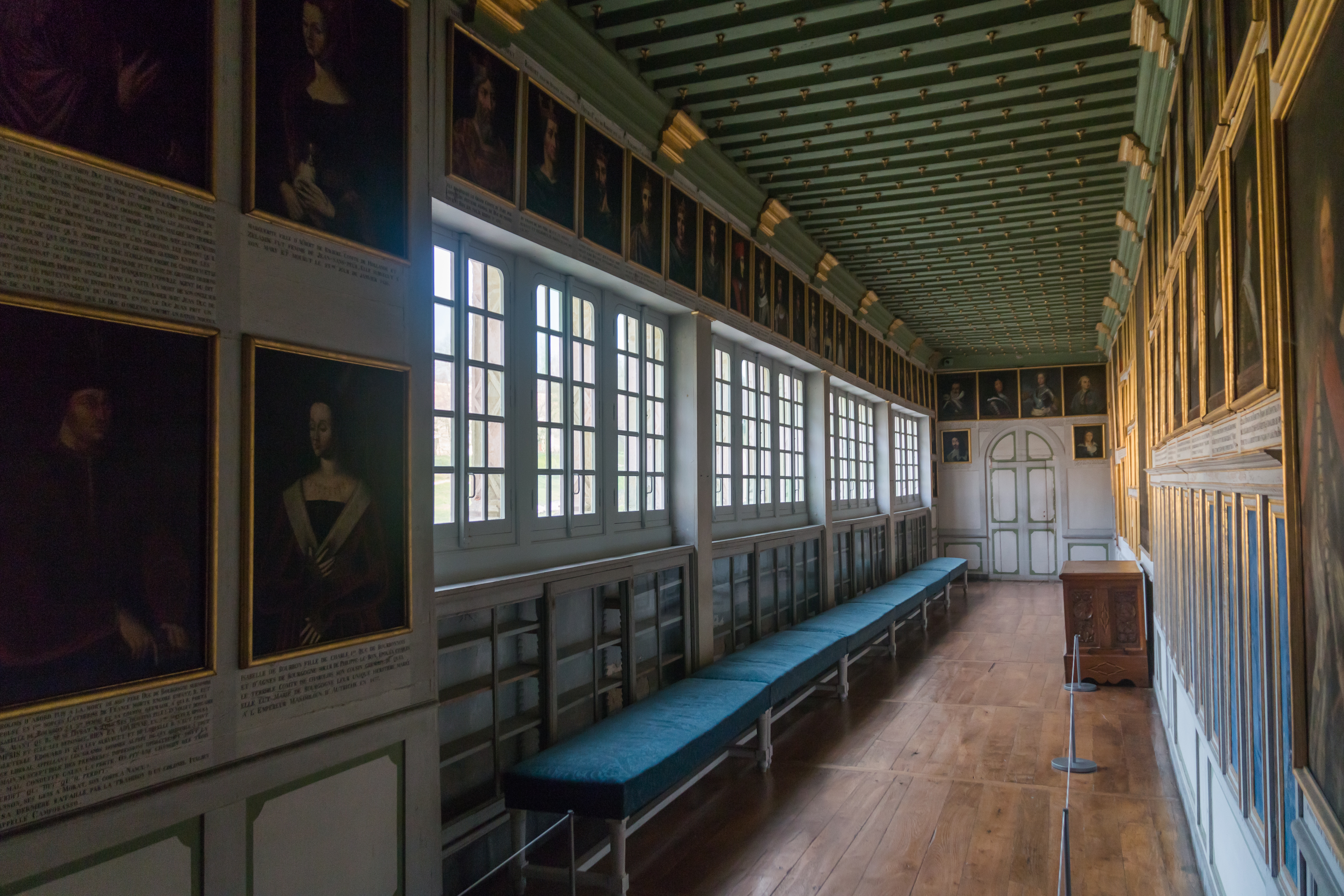
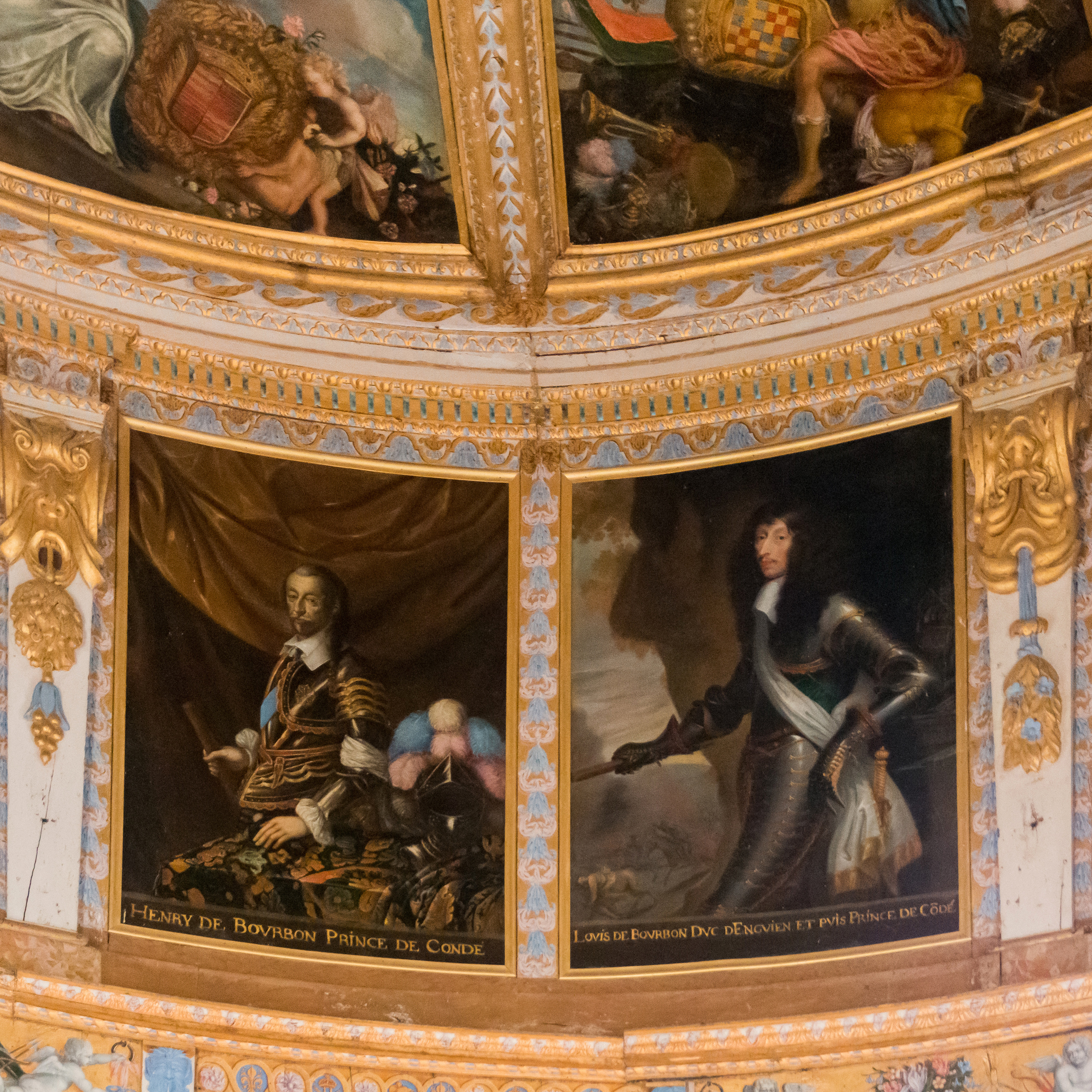
Paintings inside the château

The Château de Bussy-Rabutin (French: [ʃɑto d(ə) bysi ʁabytɛ̃]), also known as the Château de Bussy-le-Grand, is a château which developed from a 12th-century castle, located in the commune of Bussy-le-Grand, in the Côte-d'Or department, Burgundy, east-central France. It is best known for its thousand portraits throughout a series of galleries, amassed by Roger de Rabutin, Comte de Bussy during his exile from the royal court.

== History ==
The castle was founded in the 12th century by Renaudin de Bussy. It was rebuilt in the 14th century, and the Renaissance galleries were added in the 1520s. It was altered during the reigns of Henri II (1547–1559) and Louis XIII (1610–1643).

Roger de Rabutin, Comte de Bussy (1618–1693), fell into disgrace for allegedly having taken part in an orgy at the Château de Roissy, near Paris, during Holy Week. Bussy was ordered by Louis XIV to retire to his estates, where he passed the time by composing his Histoire amoureuse des Gaules. This account of various courtly love affairs caused further scandal, and he was eventually sent to the Bastille on 17 April 1665, where he remained for more than a year. Bussy only obtained his release on condition that he retired once more to Bussy-Rabutin, where he lived in exile from court for seventeen years. Although he briefly returned to court in the 1680s, he soon returned to Bussy-Rabutin, dying there in 1693. During his exile he amassed a collection of portraits, which remains in the château.

Restoration works were begun in the 19th century by the comte de Sarcus, and the property was listed as a monument historique in 1862. It was purchased by the French state in 1929, and is currently managed by the Centre des monuments nationaux. Further restoration has been carried out since the 1970s.

== As a film location ==
The château has been used as a scene for historical movies, including The Gallant Lords of Bois-Doré, La reine et le cardinal and La marquise des ombres.
