= Douglas Gorsline =

American painter

Douglas W. Gorsline (1913–1985) was an American painter and writer. He started out as a painter of social realism, though his more mature style was influenced by cubism, surrealism, and photographers of movement such as Étienne-Jules Marey and Edweard Muybridge. He worked in many media, including lithography, painting, and etching. He was an illustrator as well as a painter, and wrote and illustrated several children's books, an illustrated history of costume, as well as an edition of Thomas Wolfe's Look Homeward, Angel, and his own novel, Farm Boy.

== Life ==
Douglas Gorsline who was born in Rochester, New York. He attended the Rochester School of Technology, the Yale School of Art and the Art Students League of New York.

He taught at the National Academy of Design in New York City before moving to France in 1964. He was the first American artist invited to China (1973). His work was exhibited regularly in the United States and in France, Belgium and Germany. He received a great many awards and his works are in several museums, as well as institutional and private collections. He was elected into the National Academy of Design in 1943 as an Associate member, and became a full Academician in 1947.

The Gorsline Museum was created by his widow, Marie Gorsline, and inaugurated in 1994, nine years after his death, at Bussy-le-Grand, in Côte-d'Or, France.

== Style ==
Gorsline’s technique and sources derive from certain elements of cubism and realism. He often uses cubist composition as a means of approaching the real. Marcel Duchamp had a strong effect on him because he joined the idea of movement to the concepts of cubism — as in the Nude Descending a Staircase, No. 2. It is of note that both Gorsline and Duchamp were inspired by the chronophotography of Étienne-Jules Marey who in order to fulfill his scientific pursuits invented cameras and methods to decompose movement.

While other schools of art seemed to concentrate on playing with reality in displaced or symbolic ways, Gorsline sought a solution that allowed his subjects their true actuality, their true features — all the more true in that they are seen in a state of movement. Technical and emotional values are joined in each canvas. Meanwhile one can see the expression of a sequential simultaneity, a succession of realities, which coexist, in our lives and in the world at large.

== Books ==
Books that Douglas Gorsline wrote and/or illustrated:

- Viking Adventure, by Clyde Robert Bulla, ISBN 9780690860153
- Farm Boy, by Douglas Gorsline, ISBN 0-670-30832-3
- What People Wore: 1,800 Illustrations from Ancient Times to the Early Twentieth Century, ISBN 0-486-28162-0
- The Night Before Christmas, by Clement Clarke Moore, ISBN 0-394-83019-9
- The Pioneers, by Marie Gorsline, ISBN 0-394-83904-8
- Haunted Bookshop, by Christopher Morley, ISBN 0-7858-1825-1
- Cowboys, by Marie Gorsline, ISBN 0-394-83935-8
- North American Indians, by Marie Gorsline, ISBN 0-8085-5150-7
- Mr. Lincoln's Whiskers, by Burke Davis, ISBN 0-698-20455-7
- The Vicksburg Veteran, by F. N. Monjo, ISBN 0-671-65156-0
- Look Homeward Angel, by Thomas Wolfe, 1952 Scribners Edition [ISBN unspecified]
