= Château d'Aulteribe =

Coordinates: 45°46′30″N 3°29′56″E

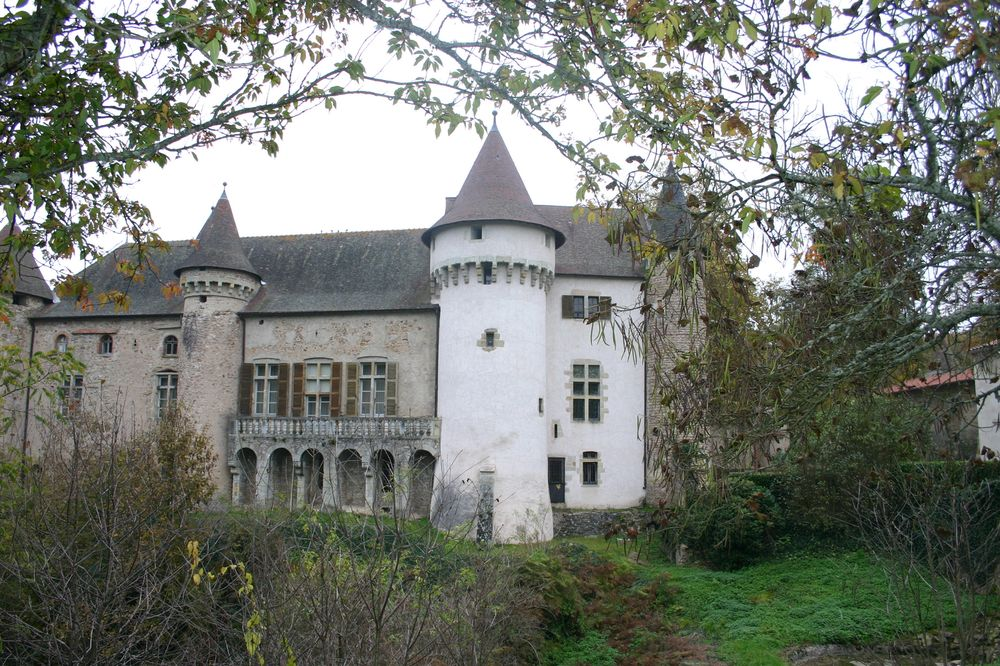
Château d'Aulteribe

The Château d'Aulteribe is a castle located in Sermentizon, in the Puy-de-Dôme département, Auvergne, central France.

Built in the end of the 15th century, it was altered and restored during the 17th century and in the second half of the 19th century. Many of the medieval-style features of the building were added at this time. In 1954, the château and its contents were bequeathed to the Centre des monuments nationaux by Marquis Henri de Pierre, the last owner. The Château d'Aulteribe is currently managed by the centre des monuments nationaux and is open to the public.

The furnishings of the castle include tapestries from Flanders and Aubusson, Chinese porcelain, and paintings from the 17th to 19th centuries.

The castle has been listed since 30 March 1949 as a monument historique by the French Ministry of Culture. The surrounding park, believed to date from the first half of the 19th century, was added to the inventory of national heritage in 1991.

== See also ==
- List of castles in France
