= Château de Chareil-Cintrat =

Late medieval chateau in France

Coordinates: 46°15′57″N 3°13′27″E

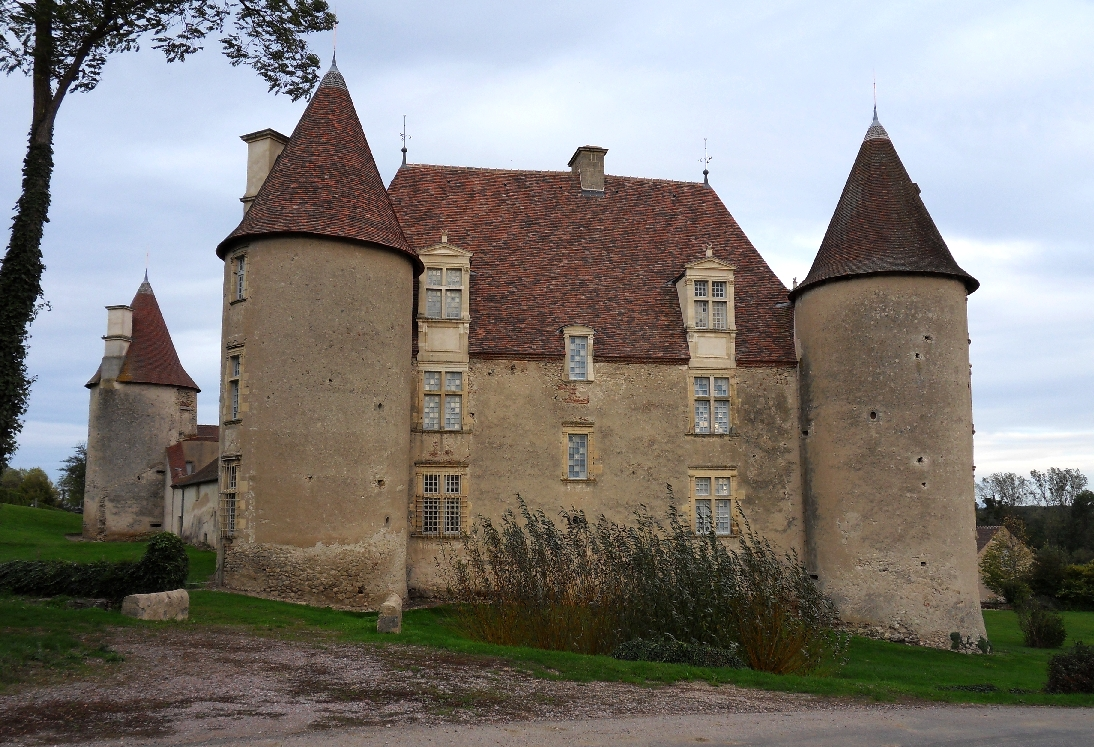
Château de Chareil-Cintrat

The Château de Chareil-Cintrat, also known as the Château du Bas-Chareil, is a late medieval château in France. It is located near Chareil-Cintrat, in the Allier department, Auvergne.

The château was built at the end of the Middle Ages by the Chareil family. In the early 16th century, it was the home of Claude Morin, contrôleur ordinaire des guerres, who commissioned the Renaissance interior decorations after returning from military campaigns during the Italian Wars. During the French Revolution the property was sold by the revolutionary government. It was purchased by the French state on October 10, 1958, in the same year it was designated a monument historique. The château is now in the care of the Centre des monuments nationaux, and is open to the public. It comprises a rectangular main building, with round towers at the north-west and south-west corners.
