= Pair-non-Pair =

Cave and archaeological site in southwestern France

Pair-non-Pair cave
- Grotte de Pair-non-Pair
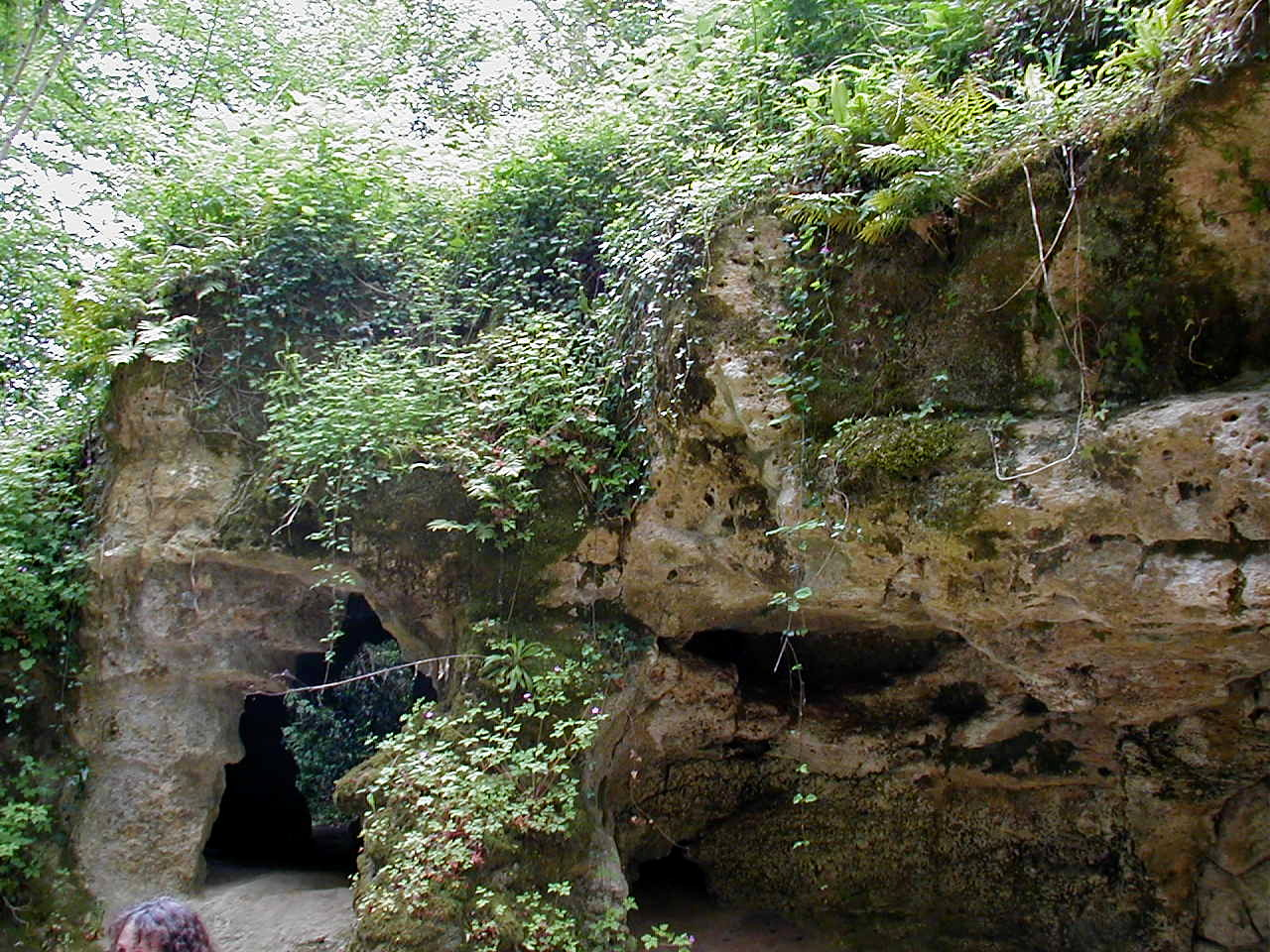
- entry to the cave

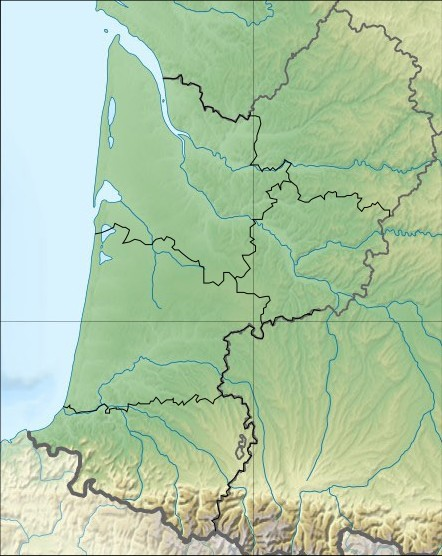
- location in France Pair-non-Pair (France)
- 45°1′N 0°29′W
- Type: Cave
- Periods: Upper Paleolithic
- Cultures: Aurignacian
- Associated with: Paleo-humans
- Location: Gironde France
- Region: Aquitaine

History
- Abandoned: 20,000 years BP

Site notes
- Material: limestone Karst
- Length: 20 m (66 ft)
- Excavation dates: 1881 to 1913
- Archaeologists: François Daleau
- Public access: yes, prior reservation required
- Website: http://www.pair-non-pair.fr/en/

The Pair-non-Pair Cave is located near the village of Prignac-et-Marcamps, Aquitaine:Gironde (33) department in France. Only discovered in 1881 it is known for remarkable prehistoric parietal engravings - petroglyphic representations of wild animals (horses, ibexes, cervidae, bovines and mammoths), "which rank among the most ancient examples of art made by prehistoric" humans, dating back to between 30,000 and 25,000 BP, the Aurignacian cultural period of the Upper Paleolithic.

The third decorated cave ever to be discovered after Altamira in Spain and the Chabot cave in Ardèche it was the first cave ever to be classified and listed as a historical monument in France on December, 20th 1901. Excavations under the leadership of archaeologist François Daleau (1845 – 1927) began immediately in March 1881 lasting until 1913. Lines on the walls were discovered in 1883 and the first animal engravings came to light in 1896 as the "...authenticity was never questioned, and it became one of the major arguments for the recognition of prehistoric art."

== Discovery ==
The cave was discovered on March 6, 1881, by the French archaeologist François Daleau.

The exact details of the discovery remain vague. Local legend says that a sheep which was walking in a meadow trapped its foot in a rut. When the animal was freed the rut was discovered to be an opening into the cave complex.

== The cave documented ==
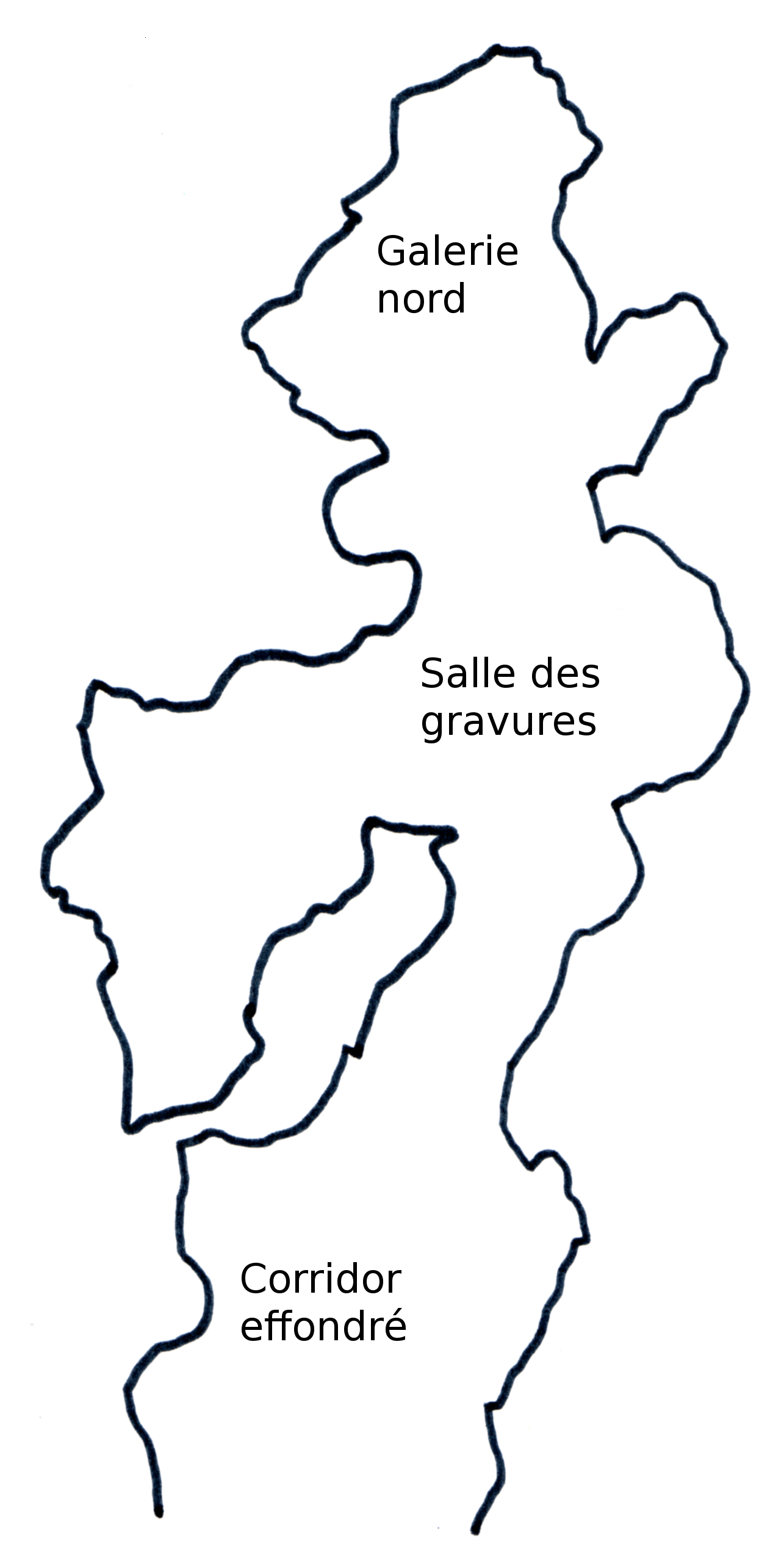
map drawing

Pair-non-Pair's moderately sized interior (length 20 m (66 ft)) can be divided into three sections, which have been named "Galerie Nord" - Northern Gallery, "Salle de Gravures" - the Chamber of Engravings and "Corridor effondre" - Collapsed Corridor.

The original entrance to the cave had already collapsed between 35.000 and 29.000 years ago during the late Châtelperronian period. Still the cave was accessible during the Aurignacian and the Gravettian period via several secondary entrances which also disappeared over time due to sedimentation as the whole grotto was gradually and completely covered by debris and filled with sediment deposits.

François Daleau accessed the grotto via a chimney from the top and steadily worked downwards through the layers of deposits, where an entrance eventually was brought to light. He applied progressive excavation techniques for the archaeological layers and recorded all the artifacts he found. Apart from the petroglyphs, wall paintings, 15000 stone tool fragments and around 6000 animal bones of 60 species were unearthed and recorded.

Sediments deposited during the Aurignacian completely covered the wall engravings, the fact suggests these works of art must have been produced by occupants living before the Gravettian.

== Prehistoric occupation ==
Human occupation took place over a period spanning 60,000 years from the Mousterian (~80 000 BP), the Chatelperronian (~40 000 BP), the Aurignacian (~30 000 BP) and into the Gravettian (~25 000 BP) cultures.

André Cheynier and Henri Breuil conclusively determined four settlement periods in 1963 by analyzing the stratification of the sediments and the precise location of the many stone artifacts and animal bones. Contextual fossils and the nature of the tools found lead to the conclusion that the earliest two settlement periods must be attributed to Homo neanderthalensis, who is gradually less present at the site during the Chatelperronian and fully disappears during the Aurignacian.

After the entrance to the cave had collapsed during the Châtelperronian access was gained during the Aurignacian by axial cavities that opened to the left of the Chamber of Engravings. The occupation period is shorter and housing concentrated more in the Northern Gallery deep in the cave.

During the Gravettian, housing was reserved for the bottom of the cave (Northern Gallery) only while the walls of the room were decorated with engravings of animal representations (horses, goats, the rare Megaloceros deer and mammoths). The cave was abandoned during the Protomagdalénien - around 22000 to 20000 years ago - when accumulation of debris and deposits had made access to and housing in the cave impracticable.

== Engravings ==
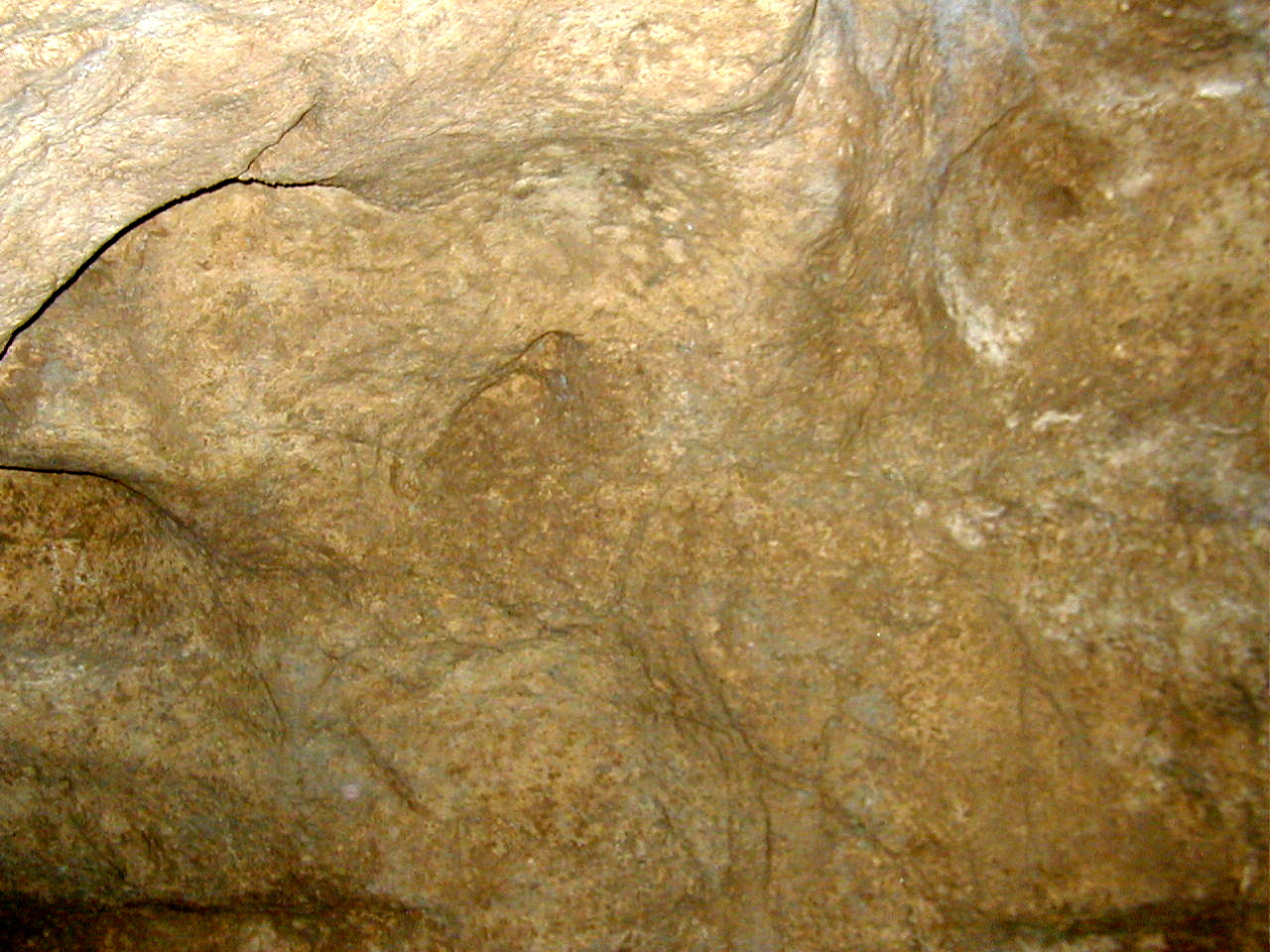
mammouth engraving

The choice of animals represented at Pair-non-Pair has not yet been explained completely. Notably small animals and birds are absent, while carnivores are represented only marginally by a few bears and a wild cat. Although carvings of the ibex are the most frequent no skeletal remains of this species were ever found, neither in Pair-non-Pair nor at any other prehistoric site in Gironde.

Most animals carved on the walls of the cave are represented in pairs. Thus, there are two mammoths, two aurochs face to face and two horses side by side. One of these horses was nicknamed Agnus Dei by eminent cave art expert Henri Breuil, who came to the site for the first time in 1898 and interpreted and dated the engravings. The horse is represented with its head turned backward to its rump, giving it an impression of movement.

The room engravings include one of the very rare representations of a Megaloceros giganteus, the largest deer that ever existed in Eurasia with antlers spanning to up to 3.50 meters in length.

In addition to the wall art, balls of ochre and shoulder blades of cattle that had been used as pallets were found. Carved and cut bones, stone and bone beads and even a flute made of vulture bone came to light, all lending credence to the idea, that the occupants of Pair-non-Pair had a desire to deal with symbolism and aesthetics in a number of ways.

== Visits ==
The only decorated cave open to the public in the Gironde region can be visited all year round. The cave is small and in an obvious conservation effort the number of visitors is limited to 18 people per group, and prior reservation is required. As a conservation effort, the cave is generally shut for one day a week and the number of group viewings is limited to 12,000 tourists per year. In order to monitor the effects of tourism on the cave, samples from the cave wall are taken annually for analysis.

Prehistoric objects and artefacts discovered at the Pair-non-Pair Caves are on display in a special museum section. A new reception building was built in 2008, designed by architect Patrick Hernandez.

== See also ==
- La Grotte des Fées
- Lascaux
