= Sermentizon =

- Commune
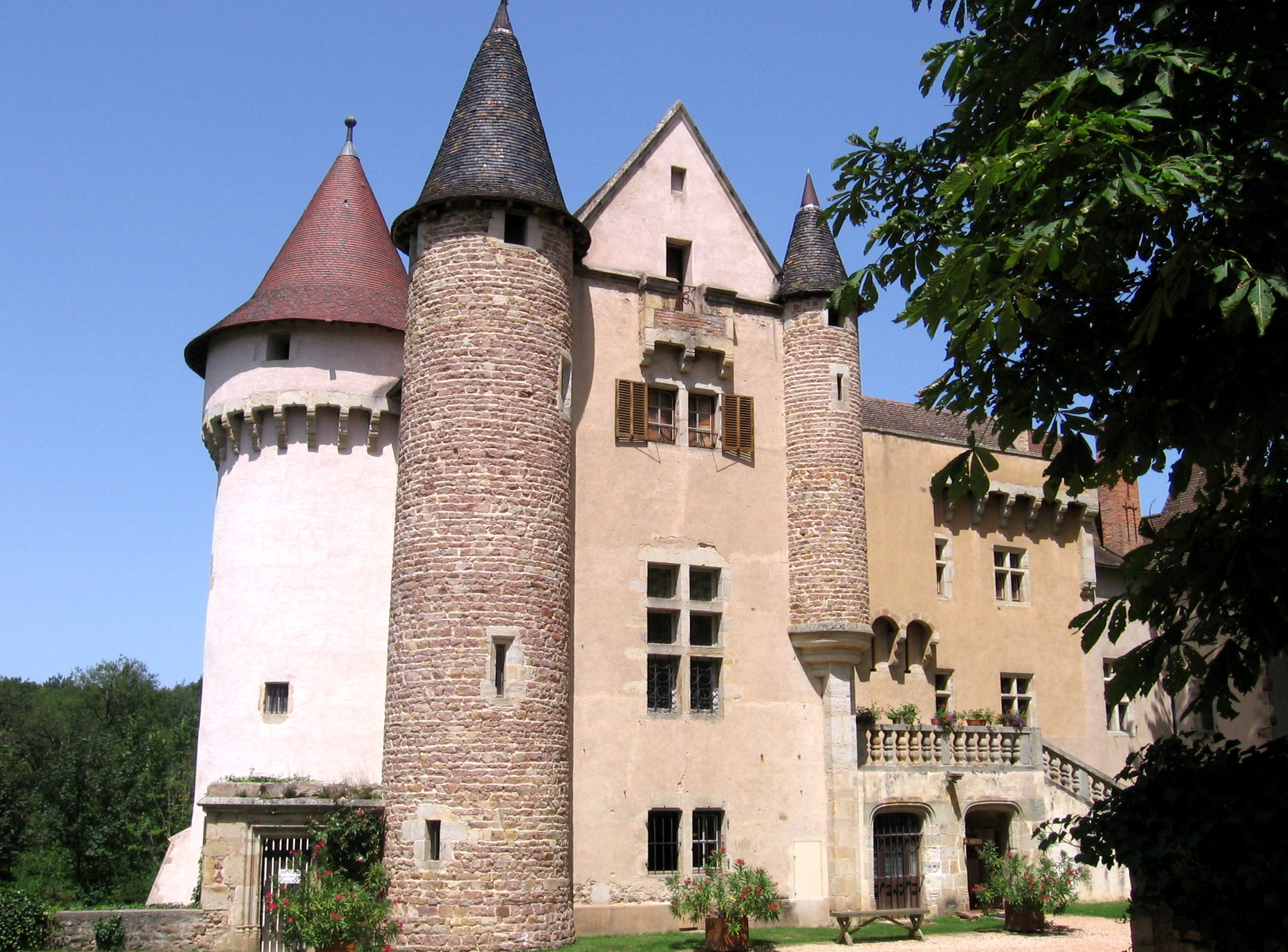
- Aulteribe Château in Sermentizon
- Location of Sermentizon
- Location within France Location within Auvergne-Rhône-Alpes
- Coordinates: 45°45′47″N 3°30′04″E
- Country: France
- Region: Auvergne-Rhône-Alpes
- Department: Puy-de-Dôme
- Arrondissement: Thiers
- Canton: Les Monts du Livradois

Government
  - Mayor (2020–2026): Serge Théallier
- Area^{1}: 18.41 km^{2} (7.11 sq mi)
- Elevation: 440 m (1,440 ft)
- Highest elevation: 535 m (1,755 ft)
- Lowest elevation: 314 m (1,030 ft)
- Population (2023): 605
  - Density: 32.9/km^{2} (85.1/sq mi)
- Time zone: UTC+01:00 (CET)
  - Summer (DST): UTC+02:00 (CEST)
- INSEE/Postal code: 63418 /63120
- ^{1} French Land Register data, which excludes lakes, ponds, glaciers > 1 km^{2} (0.386 sq mi or 247 acres) and river estuaries.

Sermentizon (French pronunciation: [sɛʁmɑ̃tizɔ̃]; Occitan: Sarmention) is a commune in the Puy-de-Dôme département in Auvergne in central France.

Its inhabitants are called Sermentizonais (male) or Sermentizonaises (female).

== Sites and monuments ==
- Château d'Aulteribe, medieval castle restored in 19th century
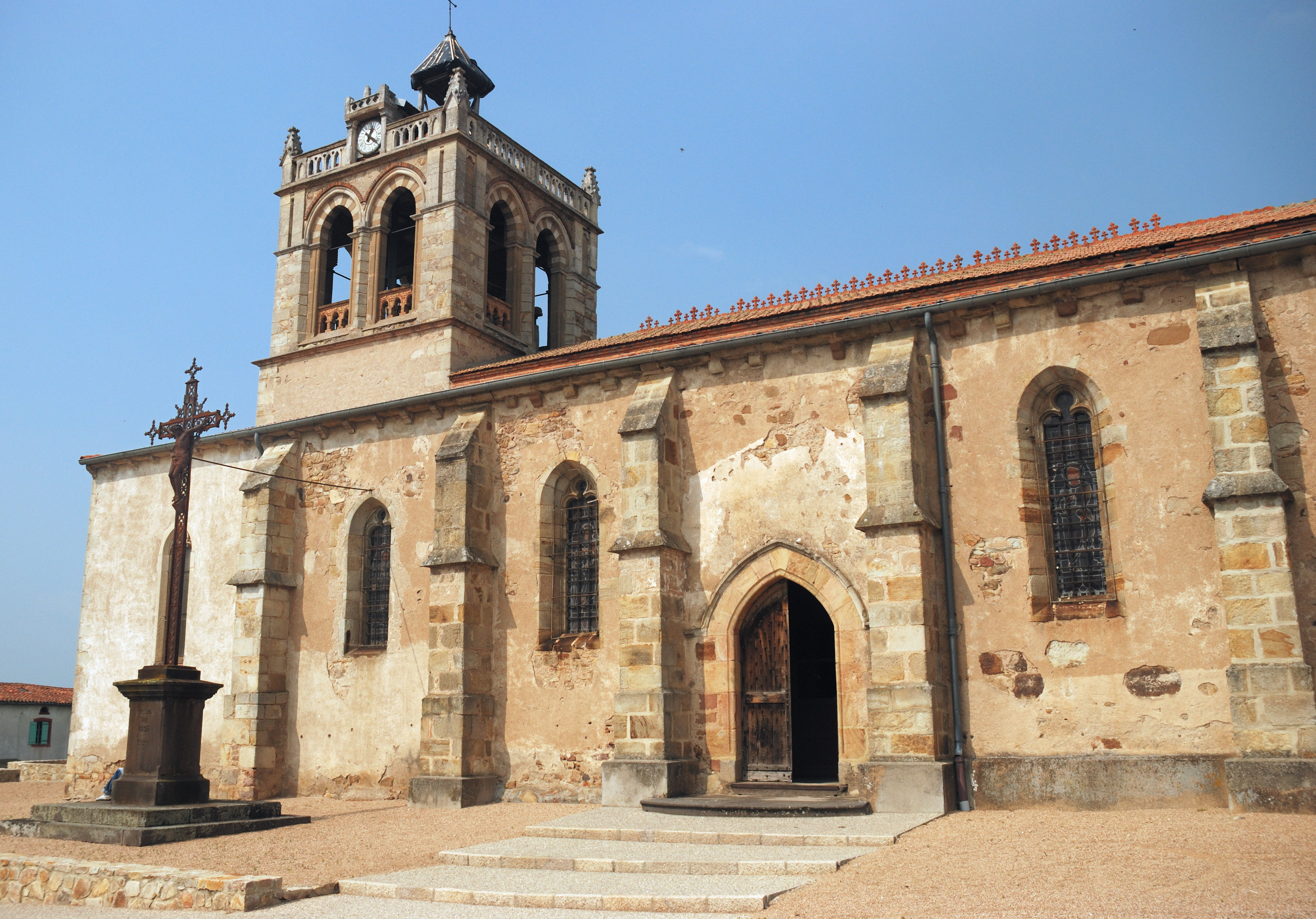
The church

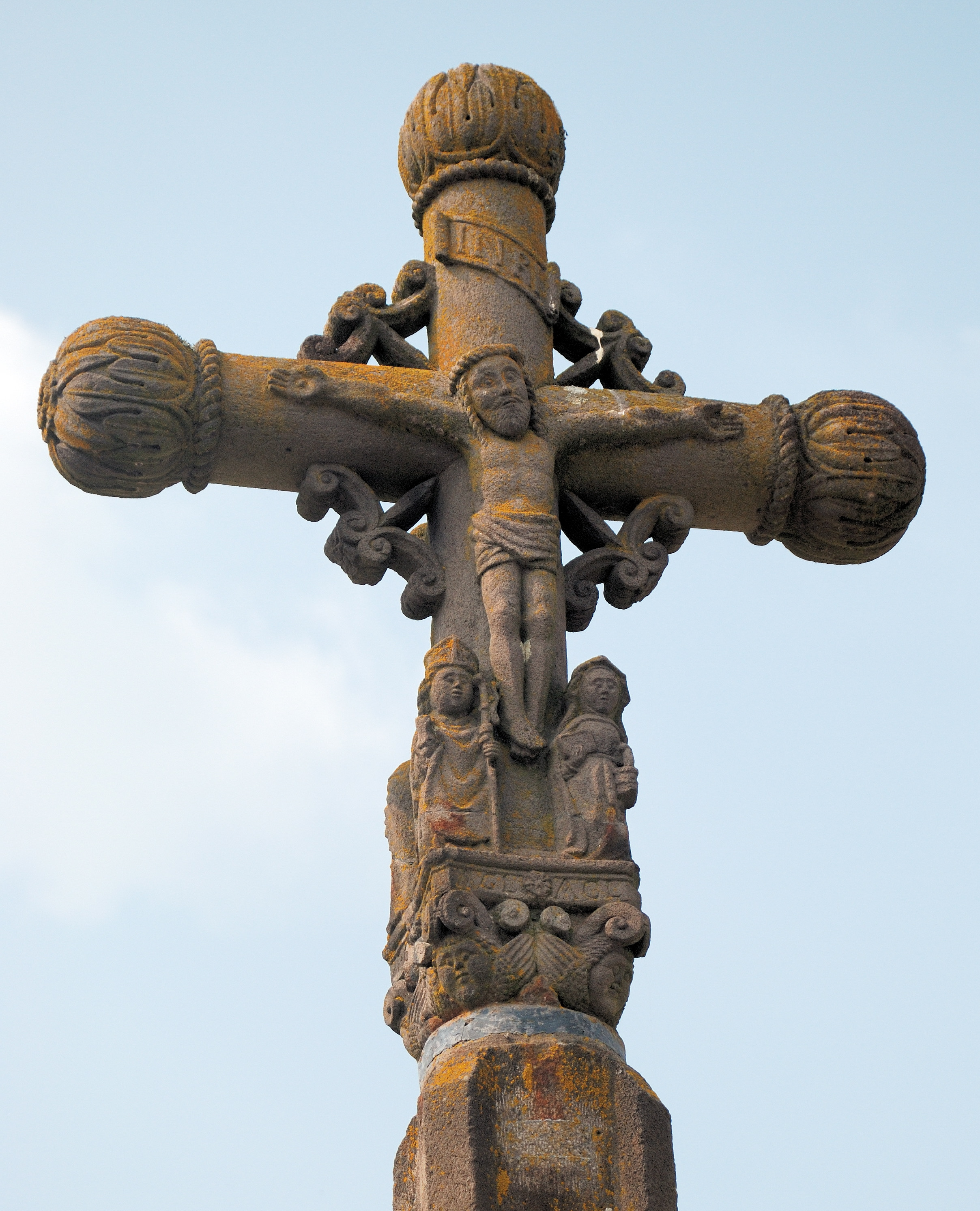
Cross

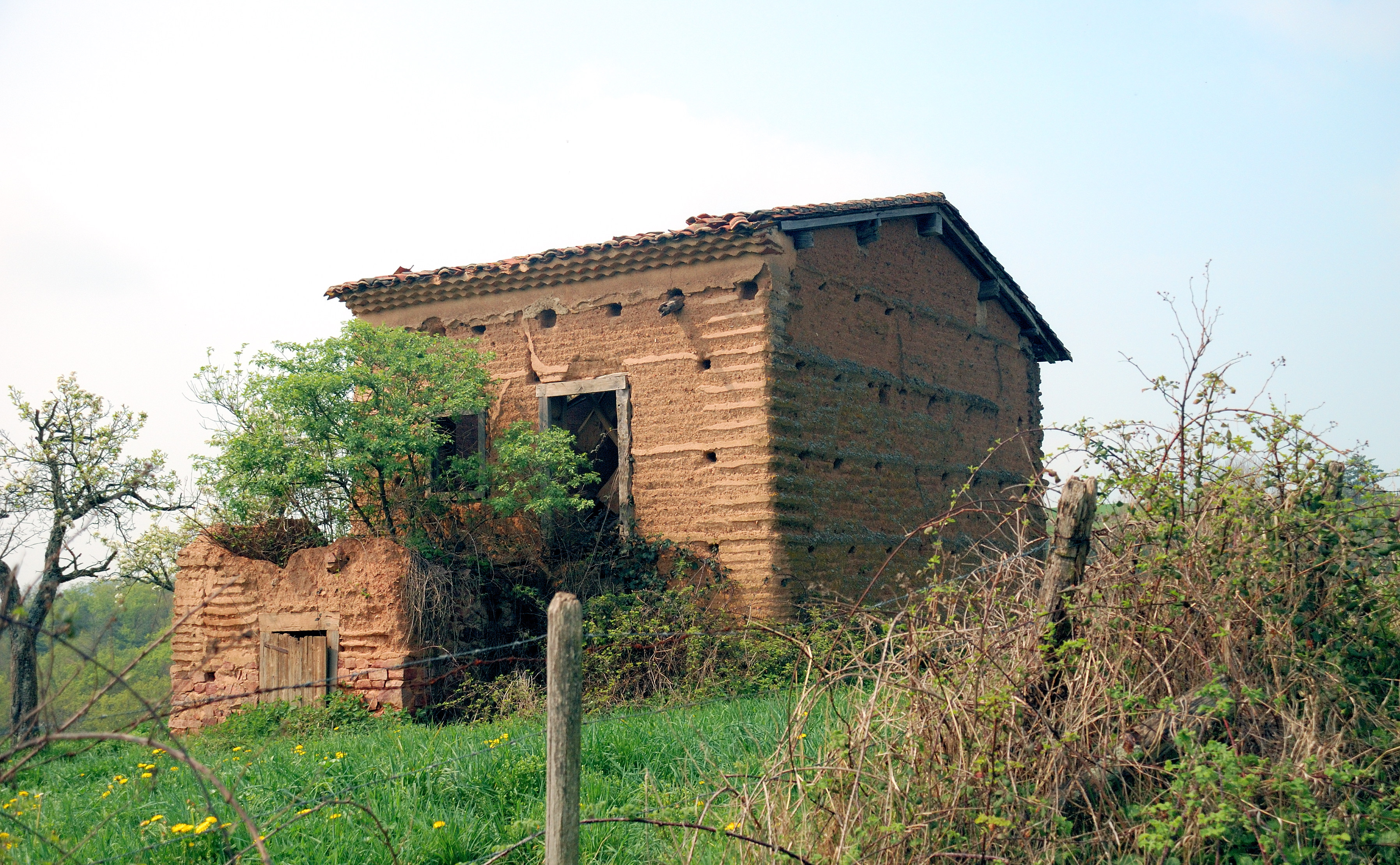
House built of rammed earth

== See also ==
- Communes of the Puy-de-Dôme department
