= Bussy-le-Grand =

- Commune
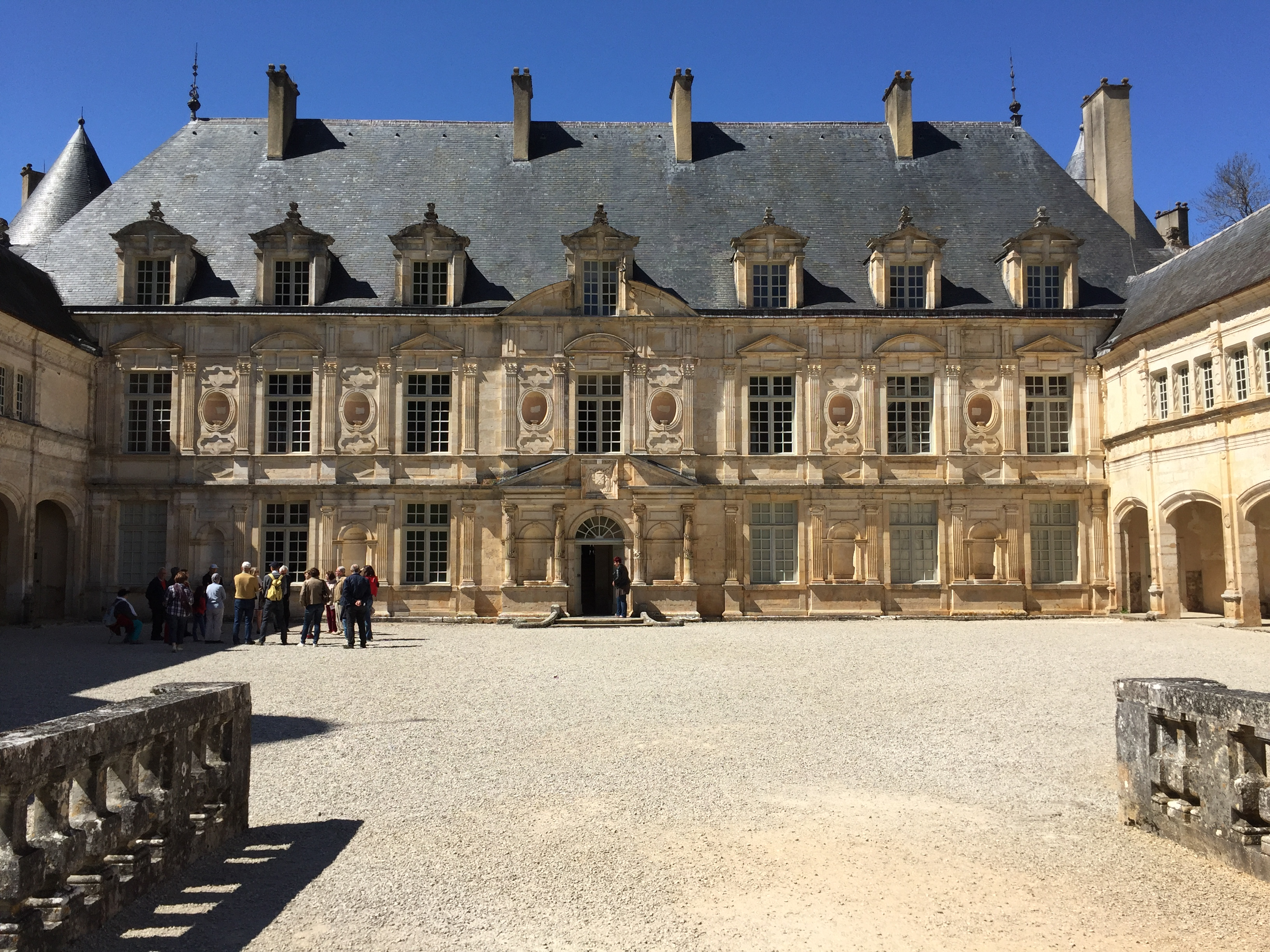
- Château de Bussy-Rabutin
- Location of Bussy-le-Grand
- Location within France Location within Bourgogne-Franche-Comté
- Coordinates: 47°34′30″N 4°31′06″E
- Country: France
- Region: Bourgogne-Franche-Comté
- Department: Côte-d'Or
- Arrondissement: Montbard
- Canton: Montbard
- Intercommunality: CC du Pays d'Alésia et de la Seine

Government
  - Mayor (2020–2026): Emmanuel Lavier
- Area^{1}: 29.69 km^{2} (11.46 sq mi)
- Elevation: 428 m (1,404 ft)
- Highest elevation: 431 m (1,414 ft)
- Lowest elevation: 250 m (820 ft)
- Population (2023): 308
  - Density: 10.4/km^{2} (26.9/sq mi)
- Demonym: Bussynois
- Time zone: UTC+01:00 (CET)
  - Summer (DST): UTC+02:00 (CEST)
- INSEE/Postal code: 21122 /21150
- ^{1} French Land Register data, which excludes lakes, ponds, glaciers > 1 km^{2} (0.386 sq mi or 247 acres) and river estuaries.

Bussy-le-Grand (French pronunciation: [bysi l(ə) ɡʁɑ̃]; lit. 'Bussy-the-Great') is a rural commune in the Côte-d'Or department in central-east France. It is known for its Château de Bussy-Rabutin, a monument historique since 1862, with its galleries of a thousand portraits.

== Population ==
Historical population
Year	Pop.	±% p.a.
1968	367	—
1975	312	−2.29%
1982	298	−0.65%
1990	246	−2.37%
1999	267	+0.91%
2007	285	+0.82%
2012	324	+2.60%
2017	316	−0.50%
2023	308	−0.43%
Source: INSEE

== Personalities ==
Jean-Andoche Junot (1771–1813), a general under Napoleon, was born in the village. The Château de Bussy-Rabutin was the home of the 17th-century courtier and writer Roger de Rabutin, Comte de Bussy.

In the 20th century the American painter Douglas Gorsline (1913–1985) lived in the village for 20 years.

== See also ==
- Communes of the Côte-d'Or department
