= Montmaurin =

- Commune
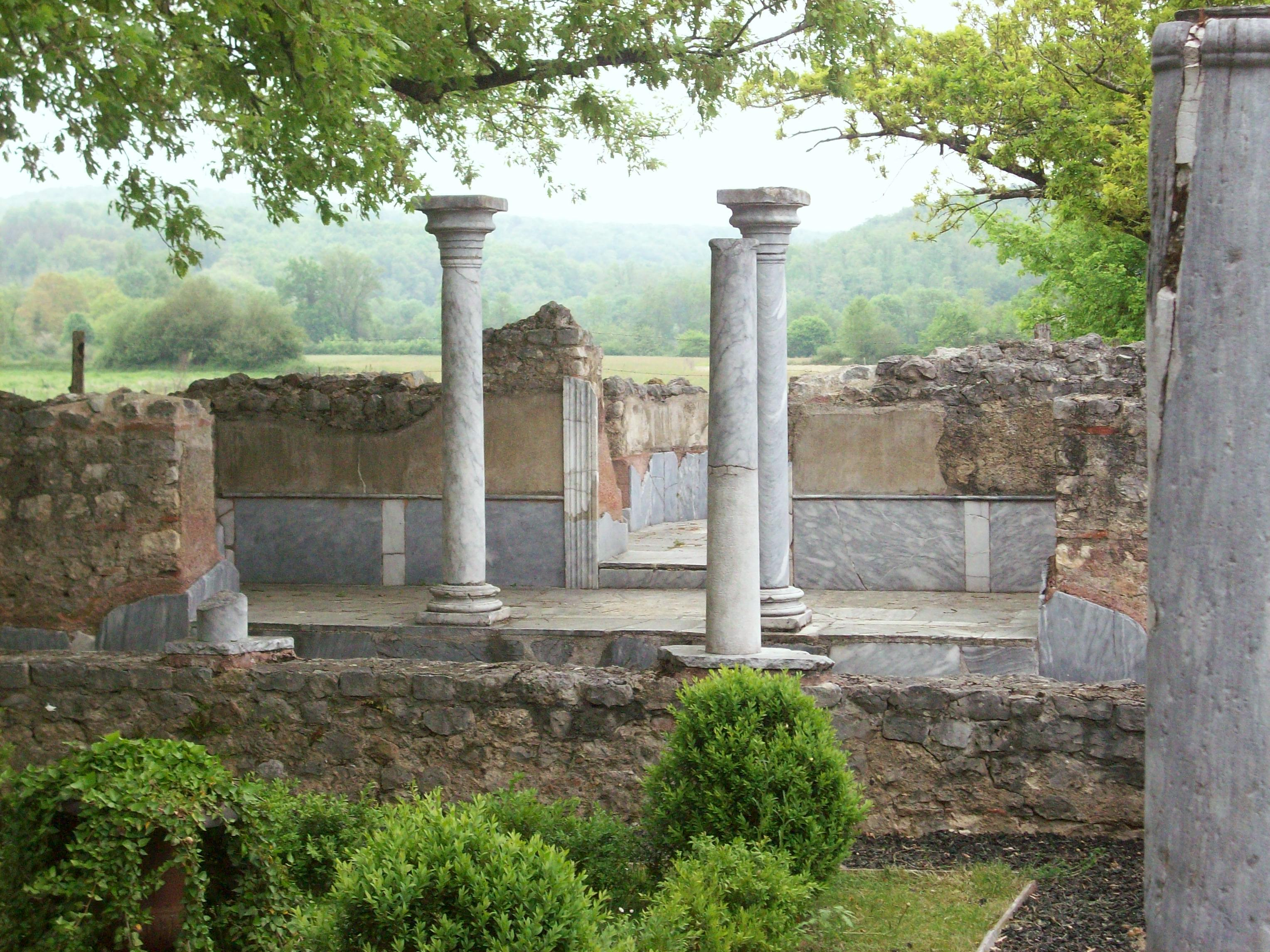
- Roman villa

- Coat of arms
- Location of Montmaurin
- Location within France Location within Occitanie
- Coordinates: 43°13′30″N 0°38′17″E
- Country: France
- Region: Occitania
- Department: Haute-Garonne
- Arrondissement: Saint-Gaudens
- Canton: Saint-Gaudens

Government
  - Mayor (2020–2026): Gabriel Amiel
- Area^{1}: 8.45 km^{2} (3.26 sq mi)
- Elevation: 379 m (1,243 ft)
- Highest elevation: 430 m (1,410 ft)
- Lowest elevation: 284 m (932 ft)
- Population (2023): 192
  - Density: 22.7/km^{2} (58.8/sq mi)
- Time zone: UTC+01:00 (CET)
  - Summer (DST): UTC+02:00 (CEST)
- INSEE/Postal code: 31385 /31350
- ^{1} French Land Register data, which excludes lakes, ponds, glaciers > 1 km^{2} (0.386 sq mi or 247 acres) and river estuaries.

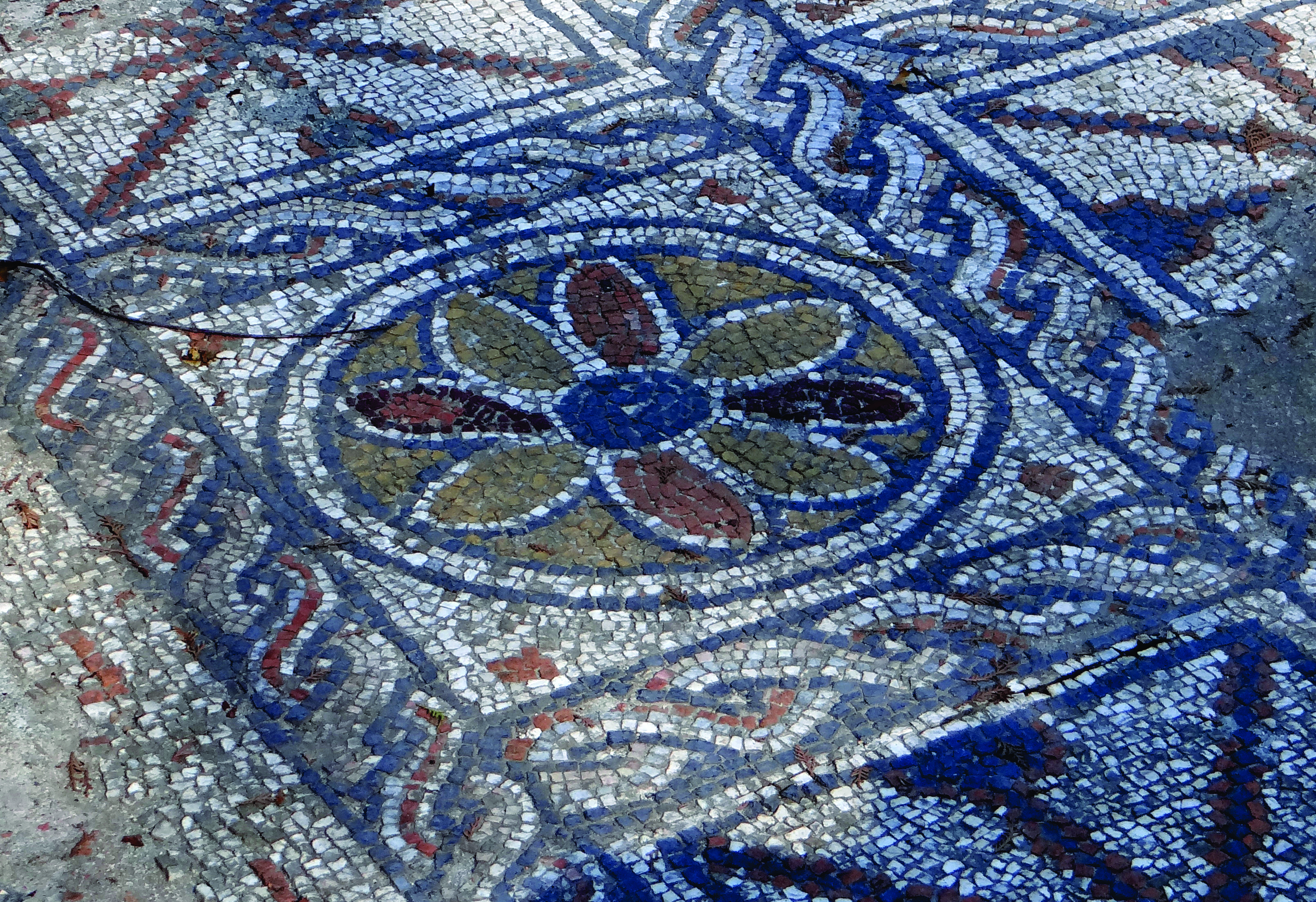
Mosaic floor, villa Montmaurin

Montmaurin (French pronunciation: [mɔ̃moʁɛ̃]) is a commune in the Haute-Garonne department of southwestern France.

Montmaurin has one of the largest and most luxurious Gallo-Roman villas in France. It consisted of over 200 rooms, laid out around a string of three courtyards, and included among its architectural features a Gaulish temple, baths, interior gardens and mosaics which are still visible.

== Population ==
Historical population
Year	Pop.	±% p.a.
1968	178	—
1975	191	+1.01%
1982	225	+2.37%
1990	205	−1.16%
1999	198	−0.39%
2007	211	+0.80%
2012	231	+1.83%
2017	210	−1.89%
2023	192	−1.48%
Source: INSEE

== See also ==
- Communes of the Haute-Garonne department
