= Bouges-le-Château =

- Commune
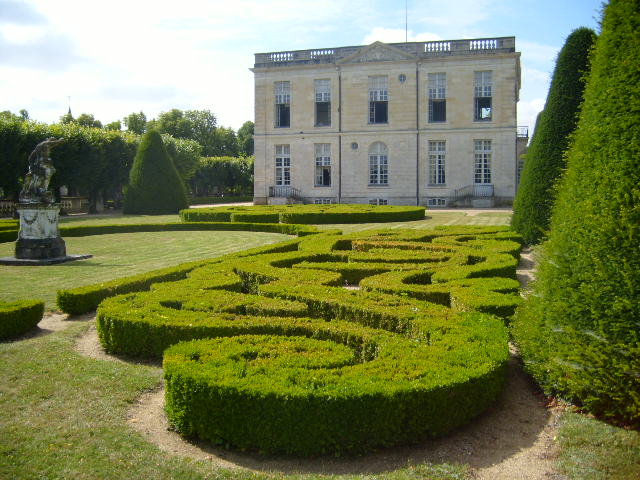
- The Château de Bouges
- Location of Bouges-le-Château
- Location within France Location within Centre-Val de Loire
- Coordinates: 47°02′25″N 1°40′27″E
- Country: France
- Region: Centre-Val de Loire
- Department: Indre
- Arrondissement: Châteauroux
- Canton: Levroux
- Intercommunality: CC Levroux Boischaut Champagne

Government
  - Mayor (2020–2026): Michel Brient
- Area^{1}: 34.77 km^{2} (13.42 sq mi)
- Elevation: 150 m (490 ft)
- Highest elevation: 207 m (679 ft)
- Lowest elevation: 120 m (390 ft)
- Population (2023): 261
  - Density: 7.51/km^{2} (19.4/sq mi)
- Time zone: UTC+01:00 (CET)
  - Summer (DST): UTC+02:00 (CEST)
- INSEE/Postal code: 36023 /36110
- ^{1} French Land Register data, which excludes lakes, ponds, glaciers > 1 km^{2} (0.386 sq mi or 247 acres) and river estuaries.

Bouges-le-Château (French pronunciation: [buʒ lə ʃato], before 1962: Bouges) is a commune in the Indre department in central France.

== Population ==
Historical population
Year	Pop.	±% p.a.
1968	501	—
1975	402	−3.10%
1982	360	−1.56%
1990	308	−1.93%
1999	255	−2.08%
2007	267	+0.58%
2012	286	+1.38%
2017	266	−1.44%
2023	261	−0.32%
Source: INSEE

== See also ==
- Communes of the Indre department
