= Château de Bouges =

Historic mansion in France

Coordinates: 47°2′32″N 1°40′23″E

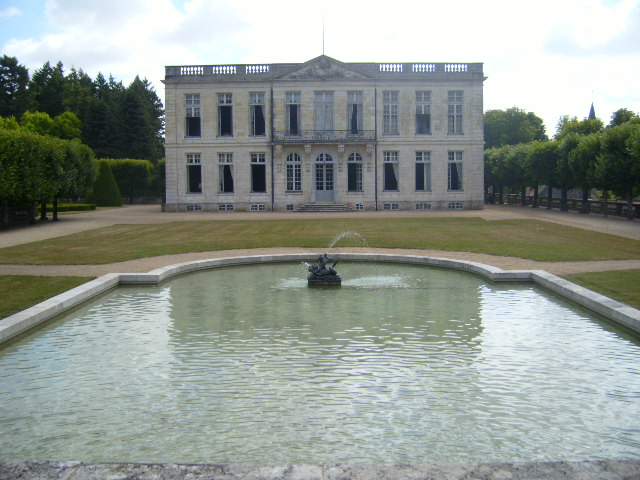
Facade and basin of the Château de Bouges

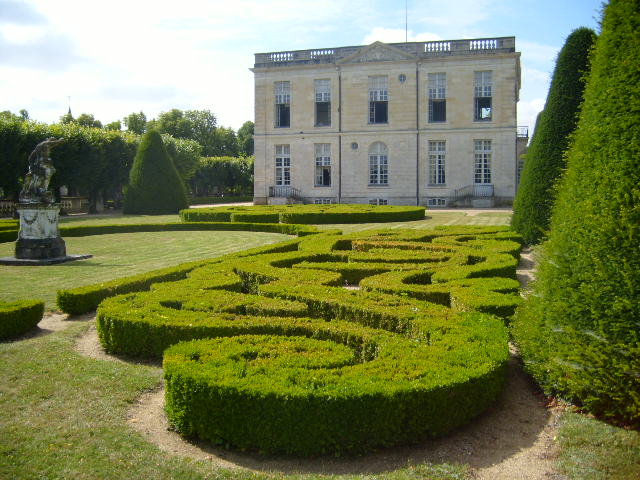
The Château de Bouges

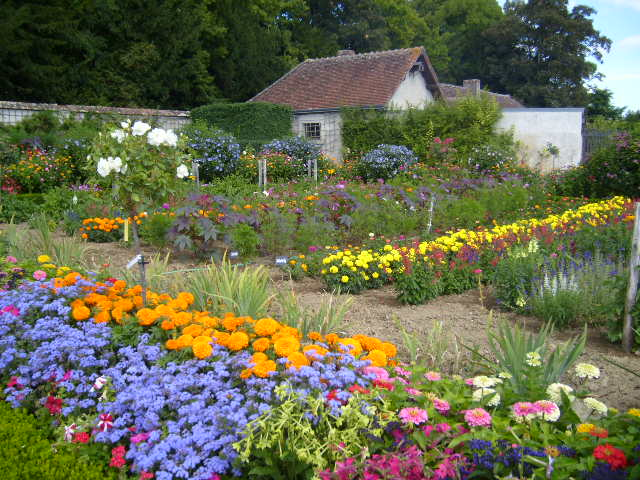
Flower Garden of the Château de Bouges

The Château de Bouges (French pronunciation: [ʃato də buʒ]) is an 18th-century mansion in the town of Bouges-le-Château, in the Indre département of France, in the Loire Valley. It is classified as a monument historique and the gardens are listed by the Ministry of Culture as among the Notable Gardens of France. The château and gardens are open to the public.

== History ==
The château was built in 1765, probably by Ange-Jacques Gabriel, on lands acquired by Charles-François Leblanc de Manarval, the master of the royal forges and the director of the royal manufacturer of cloth in Châteauroux. The château was modelled after the Petit Trianon at the Palace of Versailles. In 1818, the château became the property of Charles-Maurice de Talleyrand-Périgord, the former foreign minister of Napoleon Bonaparte. Talleyrand put it at the disposition of his niece and, according to rumours, his one-time mistress, Dorothée de Courlande (1793-1862), who held successively the titles of Comtesse Edmond de Périgord (1809), Duchesse de Dino (1817), Duchesse de Talleyrand (1838) and finally Duchesse de Sagan (1845). She was also owner from 1828 à 1847 of the Château de Rochecotte at Saint-Patrice. The château was later purchased by Tunisian general Mahmoud Benaiad.

In 1917, the château was purchased by Henry Viguier and his wife, Renée Normant, who restored it, decorated and refurnished it. Viguier was the président-directeur-général of the Paris department store Bazar de l'Hôtel de Ville. In addition to the château, he owned a Paris town house on the avenue Foch, a manor house in Houlgate and a villa in Grasse. The Viguiers, who had no children, left the house and its furniture to the French state in 1968.

The château and the park were location scenes in the film Le Colonel Chabert with Gérard Depardieu and Fanny Ardant.

The château has a park of eighty hectares, which include a landscape garden, an arboretum, a floral garden created in 1920, large greenhouses, and a formal French garden. It also includes large stables which were later used as garages by the last owners.
