= Vauclair Castle =

Coordinates: 46°9′45″N 1°9′13″W

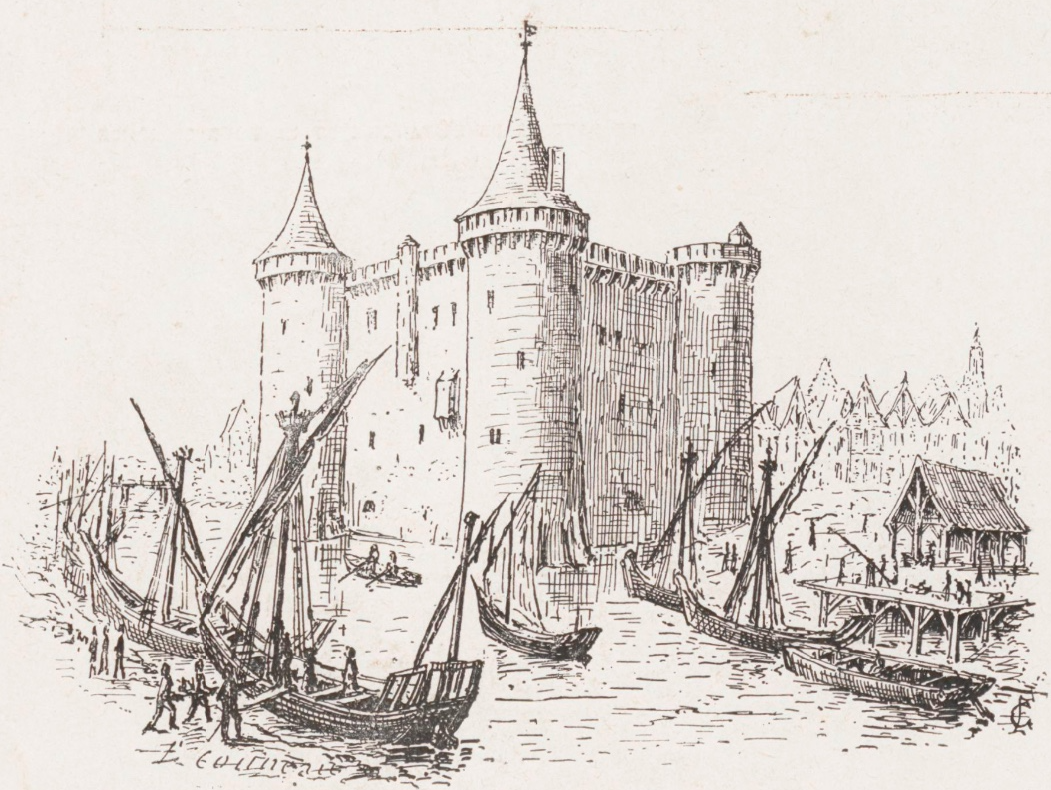
Vauclair castle.

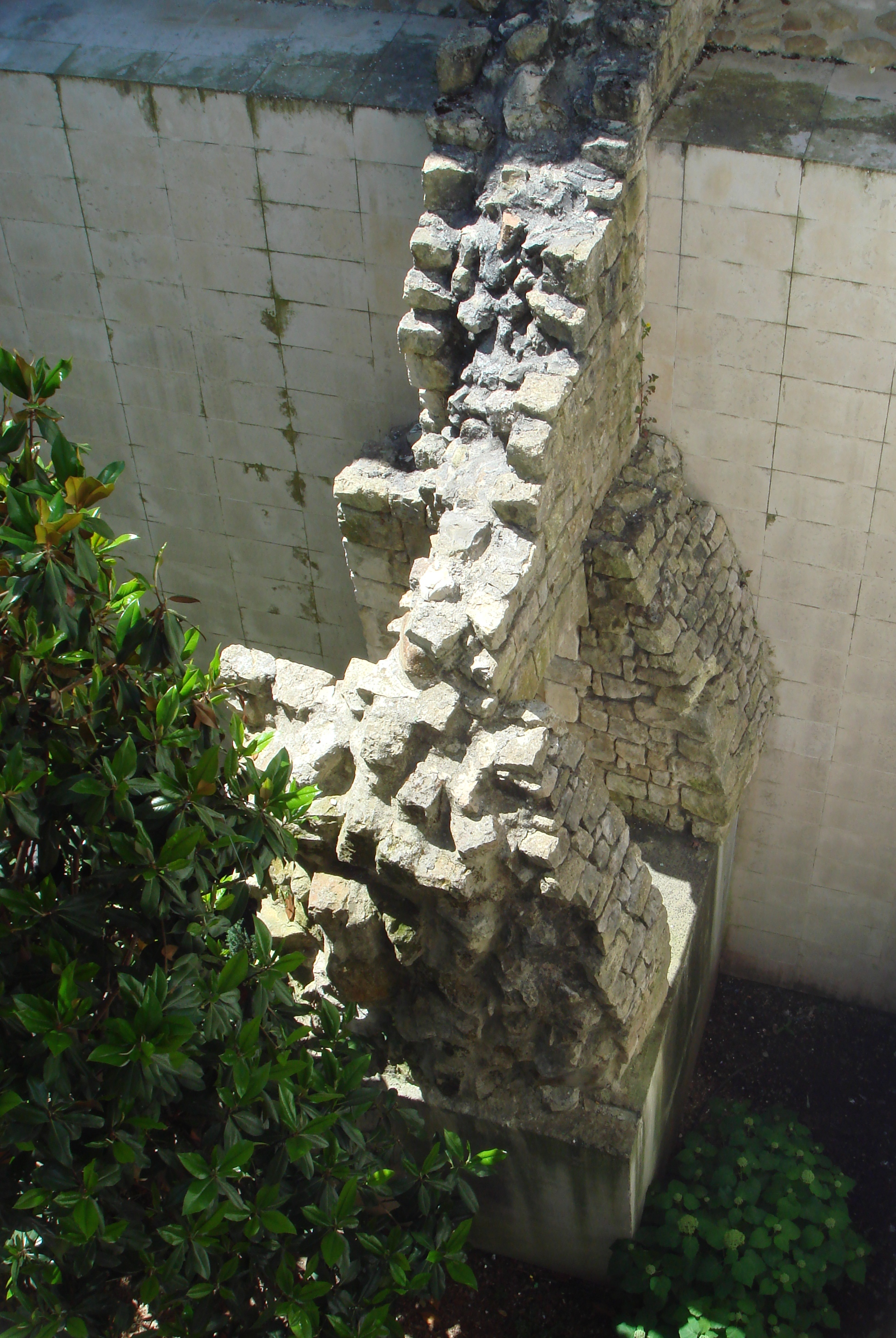
Vauclair castle, remaining eastern wall fortifications.

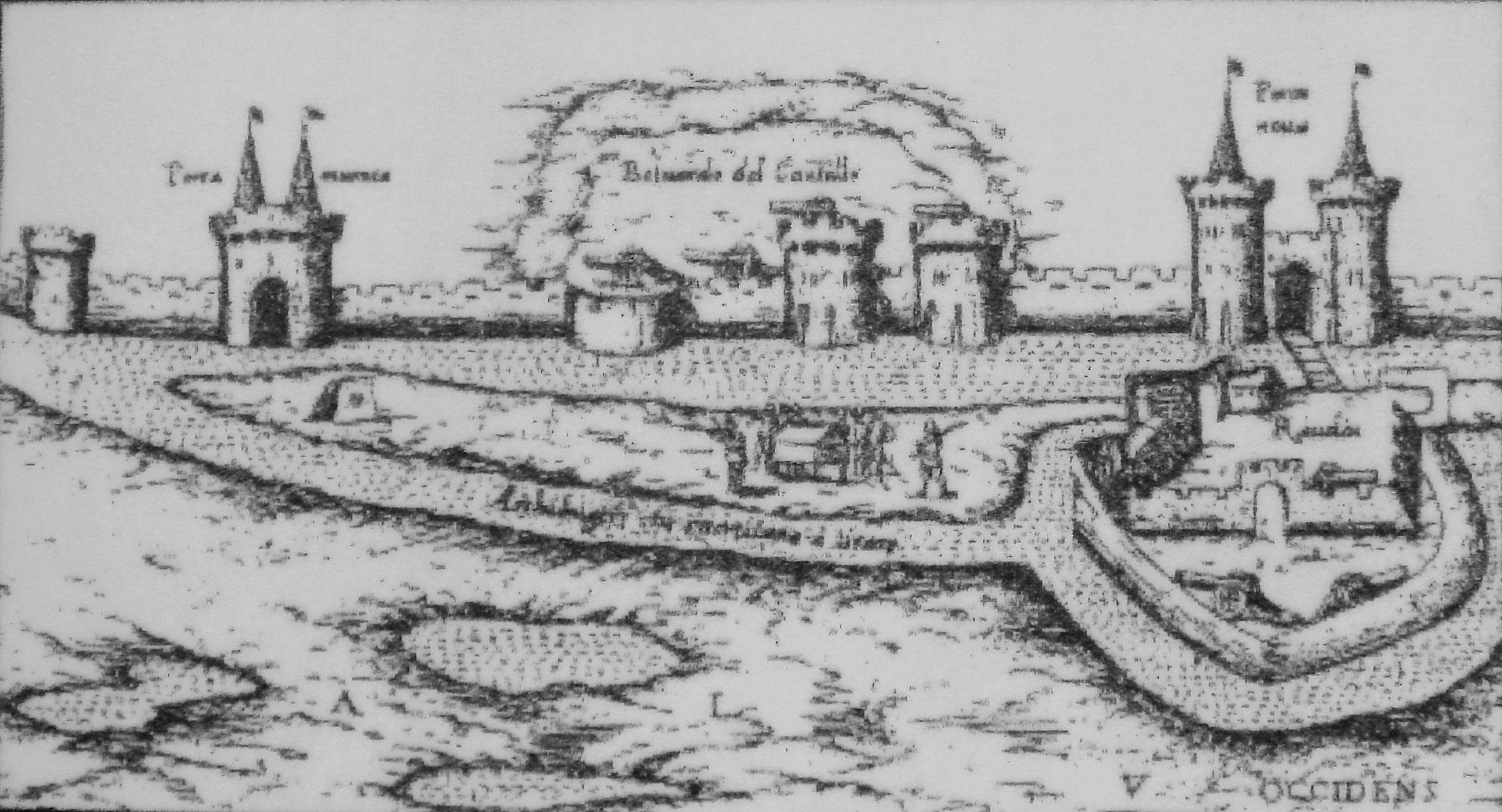
Western side of La Rochelle with remaining towers of Vauclair castle and filled moats (centre), by Antonius Lafreri, Rome, circa 1573.

Vauclair Castle, also Vauclerc Castle (French: 'Château Vauclair) was a castle built in La Rochelle, on the Atlantic coast of France, by Henry II of England in the 12th century.

The castle was located in the area defined by the current Place de Verdun (formally called Place du Château).

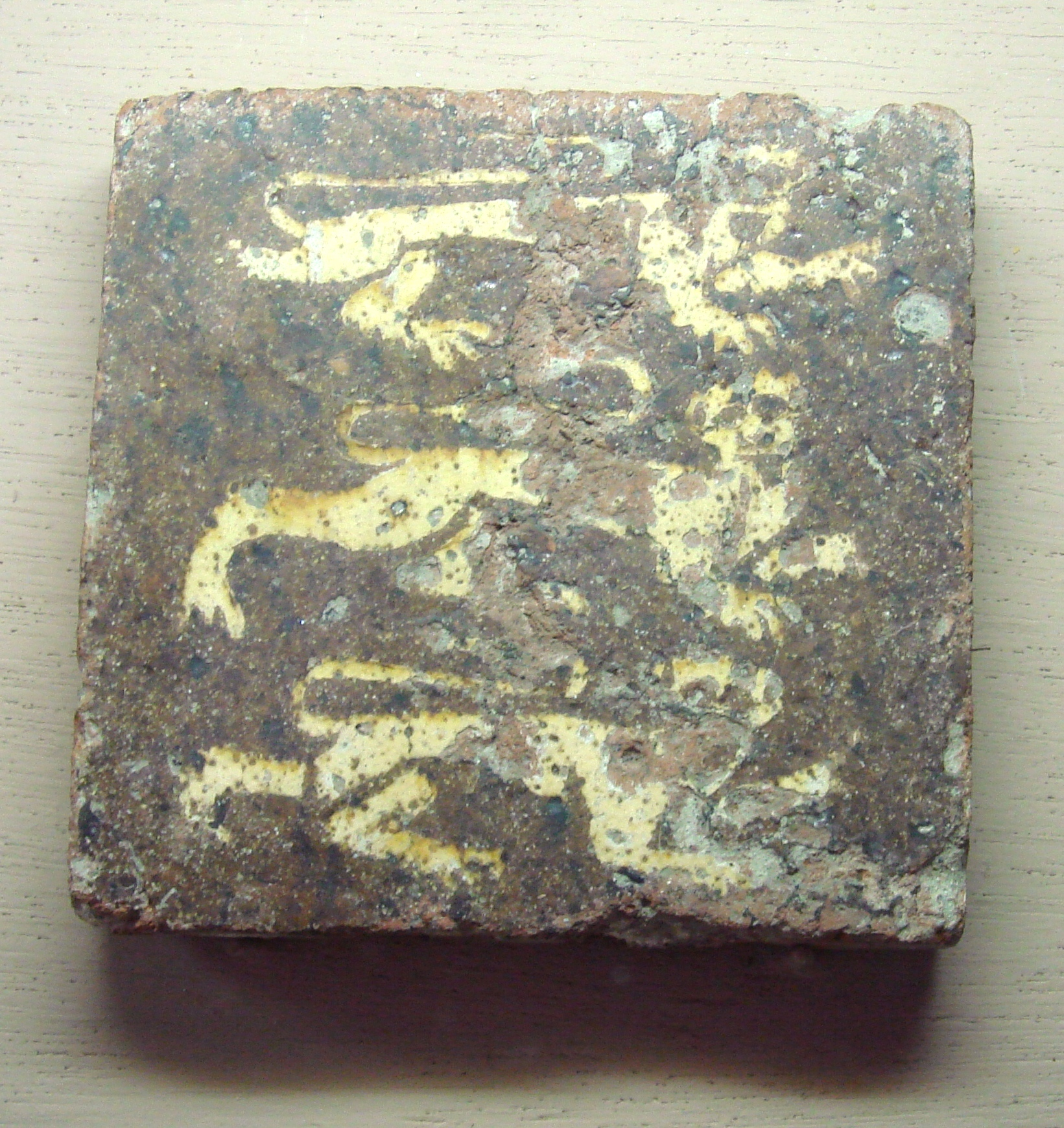
Vauclerc castle tile, with the three lions of the Royal arms of England, 13th-14th century.

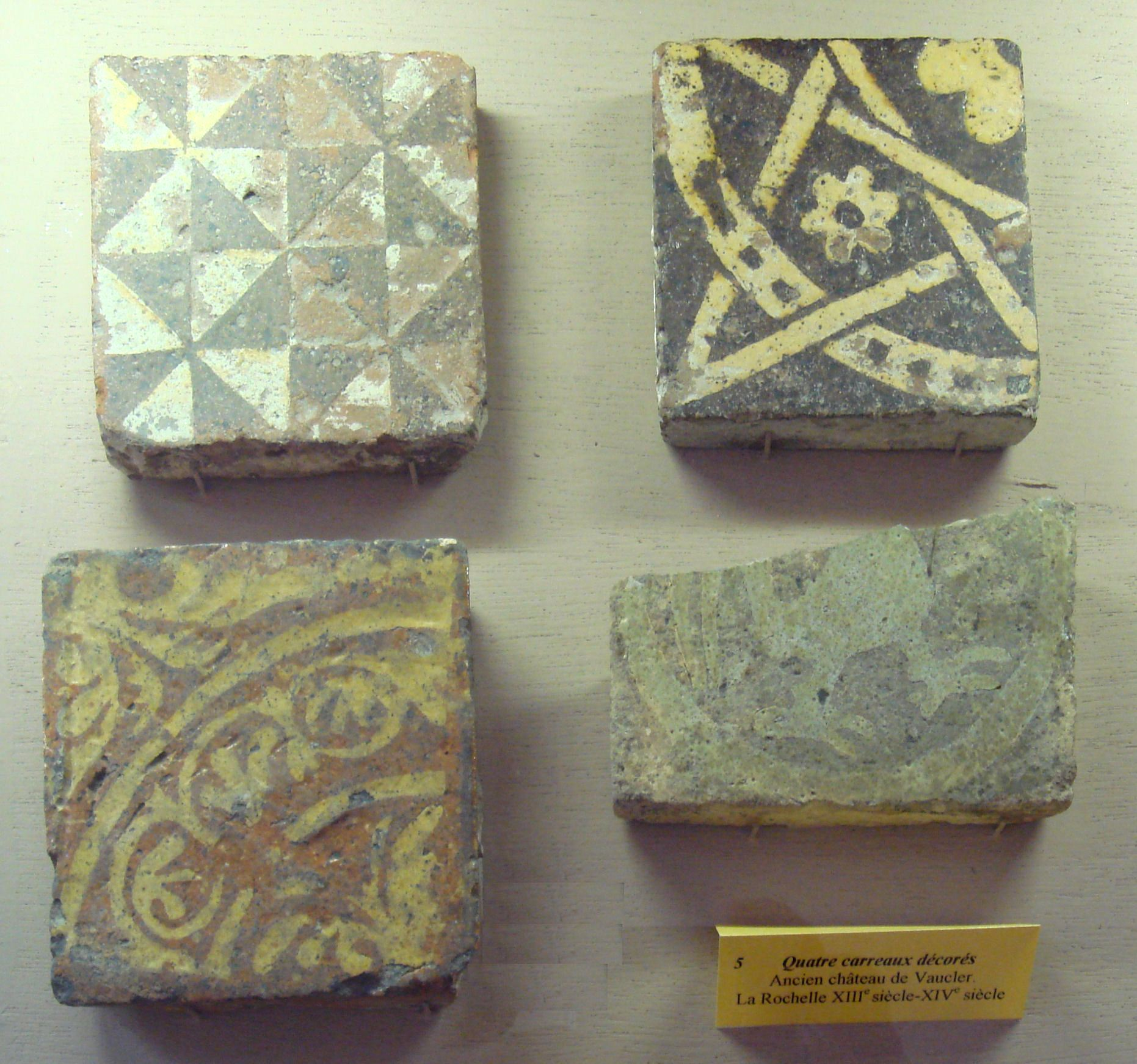
Vauclerc castle tiles, 13th-14th century.

It was incorporated in the fortifications of the city built by William X of Aquitaine, father of Queen Eleanor of Aquitaine, in 1130.

The castle consisted of four large towers connected by high walls. It was demolished at the request of Charles V of France between 1372 and 1375, after the Siege of La Rochelle (1224), and its stones were used to build a new fortification wall at Le Gabut.

The name Vauclair comes from the Latin valde clarum (greatly light, luminous or white), as it was built in the white calcerous sandstone of the region.
