= Pierre Pélissier =

French educator for the deaf (1814–1863)

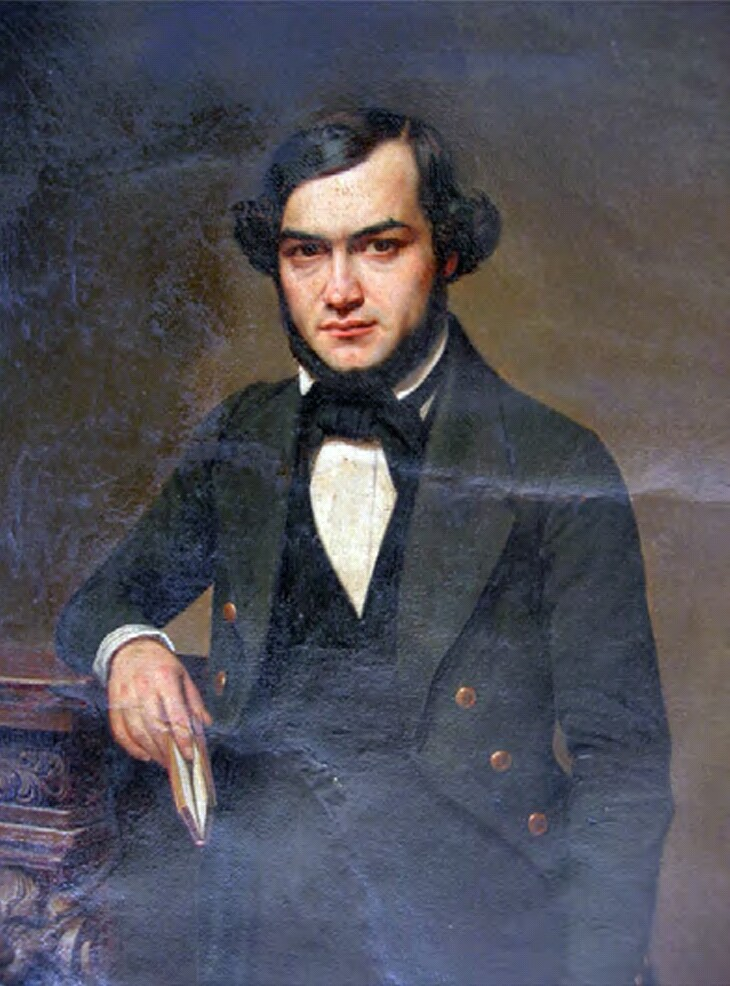
Pierre Pélissier at age 27

Pierre Pélissier (22 September 1814 – 30 April 1863) was a pioneer for deaf education in France in the mid-19th century. Born in Gourdon, Lot, he was a teacher of the deaf and also wrote a dictionary for an early form of French Sign Language in 1856. He studied first at Rodez and Toulouse, under Abbot Chazottes. He then became a teacher at the School of the Deaf in Toulouse. He was the deputy secretary of the Central Society for Deaf Mutes in Paris in 1842. In 1843, at age 29, he went to Paris to teach at the Imperial School for Deaf Mutes, where he taught until his death.

He is also noted for having been a poet. The following is an excerpt from one of his poems:

Dans l'œil tu mis tous les dons de l'oreille,
Aux mains, la voix, dans le corps, des spirits:
Et, par leur chant, couronnant ta merveille,
Les sourds-muets se proclament tes fils.

== Pélissier's writings ==
- Choix de poésies d'un sourd-muet, 1834–1845, published 1850.
- Les sourds-muets au XIX siècle : avec un alphabet manuel, 1846.
- Mémoire adressé à M. le ministre de l'Intérieur par les professeurs de l'institution royale des sourds-muets de Paris : sur la nécessité de transférer les Ecoles de sourds-muets au Ministère del'Instruction publique, 1847.
- L'enseignement primaire des sourds-muets mis à la portée de tout le monde, avec une iconographie des signes, published by Paul Dupont, Paris, 1856.

== Literature ==
- Quartararo, Anne T. 2008. The Poetry of a Minority Community: Deaf Poet Pierre Pélissier and the Formation of a Deaf Identity in the 1850s. Sign Language Studies 8.3: 241–263.
