= After Winter, Spring =

- Directed by: Judith Lit
- Produced by: Judith Lit
- Narrated by: Judith Lit
- Cinematography: Stéphane Carbon
- Edited by: Jennifer Chinlund
- Music by: Todd Boekelheide
- Distributed by: Bullfrog Films
- Release date: October 8, 2012 (Mill Valley Film Festival); February 25, 2015 USA (DVD) February 10, 2015 France (DVD)
- Running time: 75 minutes
- Country: France
- Languages: English, French

After Winter, Spring is 2012 documentary film, produced, directed and narrated by Judith Lit. It stars Nanou Bouchat, Charlotte Brajot, Isabelle Brajot, Frédéric Coté, Isabelle Coté, Ginette Delibie, Marie-Louise Gourdon, Guy Phélip, Alain Rabeau, Alfred Tripied, and Dylan Veyret. Set in the Périgord region of southwest France, the film follows the lives of farming families and individuals in the community as they confront challenges that the changing geopolitical and economic landscapes pose. Judith Lit, who moved to a town with 100 people in the Périgord region in 1999, found inspiration for the film after she recognized the similarities between the family farmer communities of this new home and her home town in Pennsylvania. As Lit captures the story of these families, she also narrates her own story.

The origins of After Winter, Spring are based in the real life stories of the local farmers and Judith Lit. It was produced by Lit through the Terra Production and Dublin Films production companies. It was funded by The Cher Lewis Charitable Trust, The Florence Gould Foundation, and Région Aquitaine. The cinematography was done by Stéphane Carbon, an active director of photography for over twenty years. The editing and original music were done by Jennifer Chinlund and Todd Boekelheide respectively. Monte Thompson was responsible for the animation of stills. The film is shown in 16:9 HD and runs for 75 minutes.

After Winter, Spring premiered on October 8, 2012 at the Mill Valley Film Festival. It was first released in the United States on February 25, 2015 and distributed by Bullfrog Films. In France, it was first released on February 10, 2015. The film has had over sixteen screening locations in the United States, twenty nine in France, three in Canada, one in Italy and one in Russia. Worldwide, the film was an official selection at 12 film festivals and has won three awards including Best Foreign Documentary at the Arizona International Film Festival.

== Cast ==
- Judith Lit as herself
- Nanou Bouchat as herself
- Guy Phélip as himself
- Charlotte Brajot as herself
- Isabelle Brajot as herself
- Frédéric Coté as himself
- Isabelle Coté as herself
- Ginette Delibie as herself
- Marie-Louise Gourdon as herself
- Alain Rabeau as herself
- Alfred Tripied as himself
- Dylan Veyret as himself

== Production crew ==
- Judith Lit– Producer, Director, narrator
- Stéphane Carbon – Cinematographer
- Jennifer Chinlund – Editor
- Todd Boekelheide – Original Music
- Sylvain Girardeau – Sound Recordist
- Christophe (Tito) DePinho – Sound Recordist
- David Hurst – Associate/Line Producer
- John Nutt – Sound Editor
- Pete Horner – Re-recording Mixer
- Christopher Beaver – Production Consultant, Additional Cinematography
- Kyung Lee - Post-Production Supervisor
- Benoît Villé – Additional Cinematography
- Yousef Koudja – Additional Cinematography
- Monte Thompson – Animation of Stills
- Davey Hubay – Graphic Design
- Judy Irving – Project Consultant
- Chris Beaver – Project Consultant
- Nancy Spanier – Project Consultant
- Jane Weiner – Project Consultant
- Alice Elliott – Project Consultant

== Synopsis ==
=== Setting ===
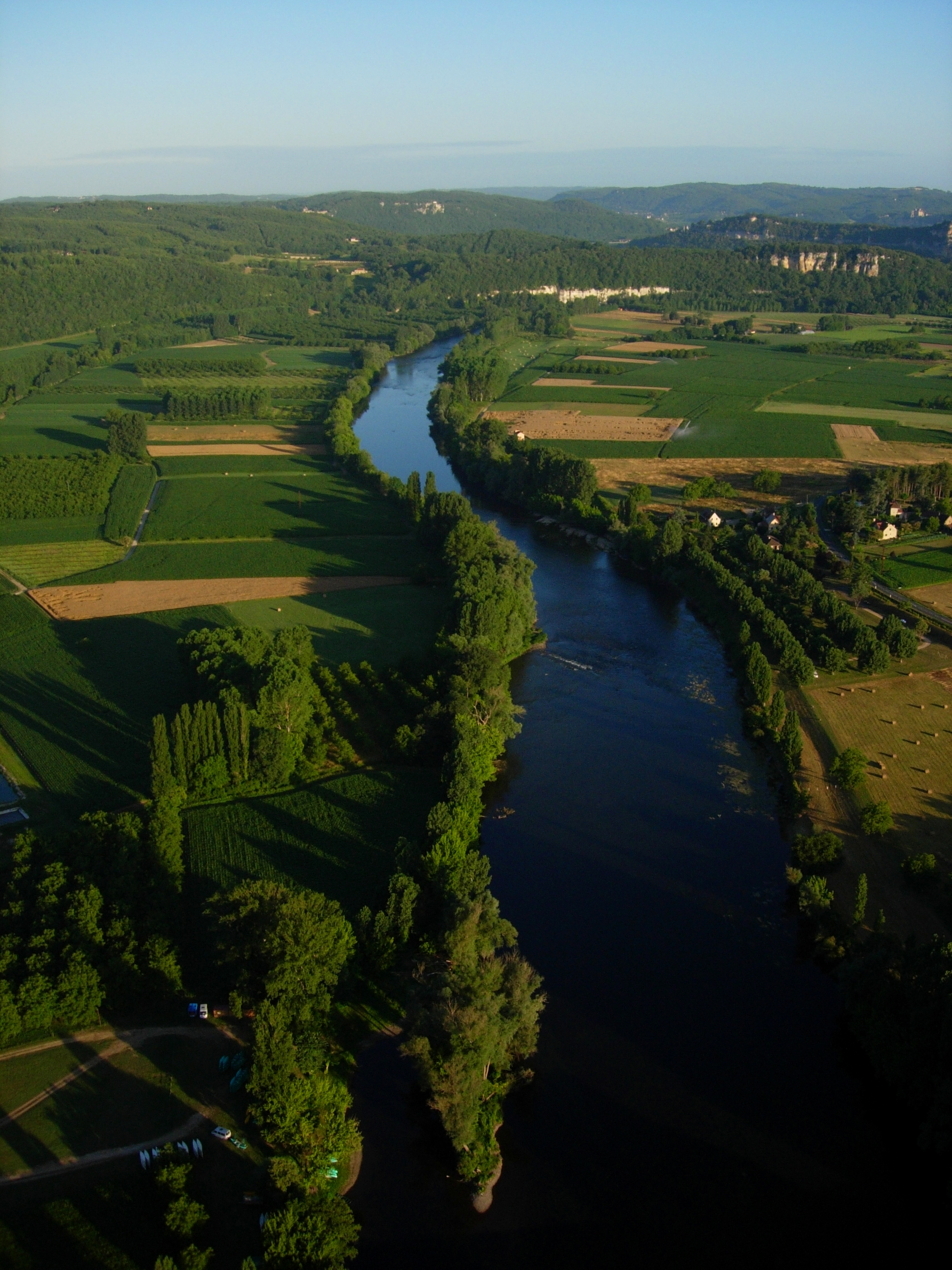
A view of the Périgord region of southwest France (Dordogne). The landscape contains the Dordogne River, farms trees and rich agricultural land. Farming output of the land consists of walnuts, strawberries, tobacco and sunflowers.

The Périgord region of southwest France has been inhibited by humans for over 17,000 years, and farming tools have been found there dating back 4,000 years. The fertile land that contains many natural resources has made it possible for farmer families to continue their practices through hundreds of generations and through the multiple empires and nations that have occupied and fought over the area. In 1607 King Henry IV of France united the region under the crown. The French influence over the area lead to legislation that preserved a portion of the region as the Périgord-Limousin Regional Nature Park in 1998. The Périgord region's different terrains and areas were labeled the Périgord Vert, Blanc, Pourpre, and Noir (green, white, purple, and black). Nature conservancy laws and increasing competition from mega-farms pose the challenges that the documentary film addresses. According to Eurostat Statistics in 2012, the number of people working in agriculture dropped 26.7% since 2000. "Despite the fact that the population of farms decreased by one quarter compared to 2000 (–173,830), in 2010 France was among the EU Member States with the highest number of holdings." Moreover, the statistics indicate that the average size of the holdings has increased drastically. The more efficient mega-farms are increasingly taking market share as they are able to out-perform their rural competitors in cheap production. The Périgord region has remained a popular tourist destination. As France adapts the Périgord region to be more fit for modern population needs, some of the endemic rural farmers may be displaced.

=== Summary ===
At the turn of the 21st century, rural family farmers are competing with the increasingly efficient food production industry. Growth in mega-farm numbers, reduction of agricultural subsidies, and new laws threaten the existence of farmers and their long-lasting practices. Guy Phélip and Nanou Bouchat, as well as other community individuals farming in a small town of 100 in the Périgord region of southwest France, are interviewed. The film opens and Guy spots an ancient 4,000 year old farming tool in his field. He explains that the tool is proof that people have been farming in the Périgord region of southwest France for a very long time.

Judith Lit, neighbor and narrator, centers the story not around the history of French farming, but around the changes those in her community and in rural farming communities in France. Having moved from The United States, Lit explains that she noticed the same warning signs in her small town in France as she did on her family's farm in Pennsylvania. Aging farmers, less interest to farm among youth, and shrinking profits seemingly lead to the ultimate downfall of many rural farmer families' practices in the US. Between one hundred years ago and the time the film was shot, the rural farming population decreased over ten-fold in France.

Lit then interviews her farmer neighbors. Through these interviews, the issue of change and its effects are brought up. The responses of the community individuals depict their constantly changing farming environment, and how they adapt. The interviews are told in parallel with shots of the fields, foliage, country side, farming, empty barns and backyard gardens. In Lit's interview with Nanou, a grandmother in the village, Nanou expresses through her own experiences how much has changed. She says "I don't miss the days of wooden shoes," but she also laments the change in farming as a way of life to a "business susceptible to investment, profitability, and bankruptcy."

A new development of tourist lodging is then shown. It has been built on top of an old, once-used farm field. Other shots of changing landscapes are shown again, and now the youngest farmer is interviewed. Oliver, the milk man, describes how in the past it took less production to incur more or the same revenue. "We had three or four cows. Now we have more than 100." In the changing era, profit margins are shrinking. He reiterates this point by quantifying the equal revenues he and his father earned selling the same amount of milk in the 1970s versus today. The film then focuses on the differences in the American and European subsidies to farm.

According to one farmer in the town, Europeans may seem to receive "Generous government subsidies," but in reality these subsidies are divided among rural family farmers and their large corporate competitors. Even then the subsidies do not help them sustain growth in production, but serve as a 'last resort' that will sustain their revenue for one harvest. He regrets that the subsidies have become necessary for the survival of his way of life and Lit says that the farmers fear government funding could be stopped at any time. Lit continues, regardless of French or American subsidies, the farmers' way of life is easily affected by the legislation of politicians and susceptible to new regulation.

The interviews switch back to Nanou. The issues of mega-farms and European Union legislation are no longer the focus, yet Nanou describes how the future will be different. She says that the ways of old rural farming towns will be no more the same. She says, "My children, their lives will be different", but she hopes their "wisdom" rooted in the old rural farming ways will stay intact. Lit concludes that just like in her home farm of Pennsylvania where rural family farm numbers dropped to all-time lows the same change is occurring in France. However, Lit cites the "Number of small farms is increasing in the U.S" and that the organic movement in France is picking up momentum. She illustrates that a new adapted means of small farming could develop in France as it has in the United States.

== Development ==
Judith Lit is the producer, director and narrator of After Winter, Spring. She earned a B.A from Syracuse University's Newhouse School of Communications and an M.A in theatre arts from the University of Colorado. Lit has been involved in documentary films and films about socio-political change. These include Dark Circle, a documentary about the perils of the nuclear arms race and Voices from the Classroom, a film about the impact of violence in media on children. Other notable jobs include post-production on Breaking the Silence and Places of The Soul. In addition, she was the director of the San Francisco Film Festival and American Film Festival. She grew up on a small rural farm in Pennsylvania with her family. After living in San Francisco, Lit moved to the Périgord region of France where she filmed interviews of her farmer neighbors to complete After Winter, Spring. For the past 15 years Lit has been dividing her time between the Périgord region and New York to complete her book entitled Other Harvests.

The premise of After Winter, Spring was conceived by Judith Lit. She comments on how easy it is to romanticize the region and town life. After her arrival she began to see the "get out now" warning signs for farmers.

Integrating her own story into the one she captured in Périgord, Lit is able to generate a global perspective on the issues occurring in the town. Lit set out to meet with project consultants Chris Beaver, Nancy Spanier, Jane Weiner, and Alice Elliott to generate ideas. Collaborating with Stéphane Carbon, the cinematographer, and Todd Boekelheide, the composer of the original music, After Winter, Spring filming took place over four years, and was released in 2012.

== Premiere and screenings ==
=== Premiere ===
- The Mill Valley Film Festival - October 8, 2012

=== Screenings in the United States ===
- Kentucky Premiere - Edible Louisville
- Maine Premiere - Waterville, ME
- Vermont Premiere- Burlington, VT
- Special event screening in Washington, DC - Avalon Theatre
- Sebastopol Documentary Film Festival - West Sonoma County, CA
- Everett Film Festival - Everett WA
- Images Cinema/ Fresh Fest - Williamstown, MA
- Environmental Film Festival in the Nation's Capital - Silver Springs, MD
- Florida Film Festival - Winter Park, FL
- Arizona International Film Festival - Tucson, AZ
- Mendocino Film Festival - Mendocino, CA
- Berkshire International Film Festival - Great Barrington, MA
- Seattle International Film Festival - Seattle, WA
- Mill Valley Film Festival - San Rafael, CA
- Greenbuild International Conference and Expo - New Orleans, LA

=== Screenings in France ===
- Cine Campagne Festival -- Châtillon-en-Vendelais, Brittany
- Terres et Films d'ici et d'ailleurs, Festival de Cinema sur la ruralité - Plouguenast
- Caméras des Champs, Festival Intérnationale des Films Documentaires sur la Ruralité - Ville-sur-yron
- Chateau de Bouisse - Toulouse
- La Fabrique, Périgourdins de Paris annual event - St. Astier
- Ciném-Rex- Sarlat-la-Canéda
- Pôle Intérnational de la Préhistoire) - Les Eyzies de Tayac
- Cinéma le Club - La Roche-Chalais
- Cinéma Le Ciné-Roc -Terrasson-lavilledieu
- Cinéma Lux - Le buisson
- Cinéma-Vox - Montignac
- Cinéma Max Linder - Ribérac
- Ciné Roc - Terrasson
- Cinéma-Notre-Dame - Mussidan
- Médiathèque - Lamonzie St Martin
- La Fabrique - St Astier
- Cinéma Louis Delluc - Nontron
- Cinéma Le club - La Roche Chalais
- Cinéma St Aulaye - St Aulaye
- Cinéma Le Rio - Capbreton
- Cinéma Le Saleys - Salies De Béarn
- Cinéma Le Forum - Monein
- Cinéma Mugron - Mugron
- Cinéma Le Royal - Mont De Marsan
- Cinéma Vog - Bazas
- Cinéma de Bourdeilles - Bourdeilles
- Espace Culturelle François Mitterrand - Chenôve
- Avant-première, Cinéma Vox -Montignac

=== Other international screenings ===
- Cinéma RGFM - (Joliette, Canada)
- Musée d'Art de Joliette - (Joliette, Canada)
- Mairie de Repentigny - (Repentigny, Canada)
- SLOW FOOD – Terra Madre-Salone Del Gusto ("The Olympics of Food") - (Torino, Italy)
- International Ecological TV Festival "To Save & Preserve," Government of Khanty-Mansiysk Autonomous Okrug-Ugra and the All-Russia State Television and Radio Broadcasting company - (Khanty-Mansiysk, Russia)

== Critical response ==
The movie review website IMDB scored the movie 7 out of 10. The movie review aggregator Rotten Tomatoes has yet to give a critic or fan score. Multiple press reviews have been given on the independent documentary film. Author Susan Griffin says it is "A rare and intimate view into what is too quickly becoming a lost world." She continues, commenting on the artistic perspective and contents of the film, stating that it contains "... exquisite images of family farms in the Dordogne and moving interviews with local farmers." Griffin draws larger inferences about the impact of the documentary calling it "profound," and stating that it creates an "understanding of what it means to live in concordance and partnership with the earth."

Jean-Claude Raspiengeas, writer at La Croix, had an artistic review of the film. He says, "A simple shift in perspective, an outside view, lets us see things we no longer notice." Raspiengeas notes Lit's commitment and ties to the filming process. He asserts Lit "settled in Périgord for the last fifteen years, took her time (four years) to observe, to listen, to melt into the silences," and finally that "distant memories of her Pennsylvania childhood where her father and grandfather worked the family farm converged with her neighbors' story and from this intimate and sensitive union was born a beautiful journey."

AXS entertainment's humanistic review comments on the farmers of the town, saying "None of these folk have any formal education, or are particularly worldly; they continually refer to themselves as 'peasants' as a source of pride." The review extends the scope of the critique to documentaries on the whole; they continue, "good documentaries convey basic truths of the human condition, and After Winter, Spring certainly does that." The general consensus of reviews available is positive overall. The film went on to win three festival awards and screened in multiple countries. The few negative fan reviews refer to the outdated farming tactics as retrogression to globalization.

== Awards ==
After Winter, Spring has been officially selected at 12 film festival internationally. It also received three awards at film festivals including Best Foreign Documentary.

Best Foreign Documentary – Arizona International Film Festival

Audience Award – Mill Valley Film Festival

Jury Award – Caméras des Champs
