= Périgord =

Natural region and former province of France

Périgord Peiregòrd / Perigòrd (Occitan)
- Natural region
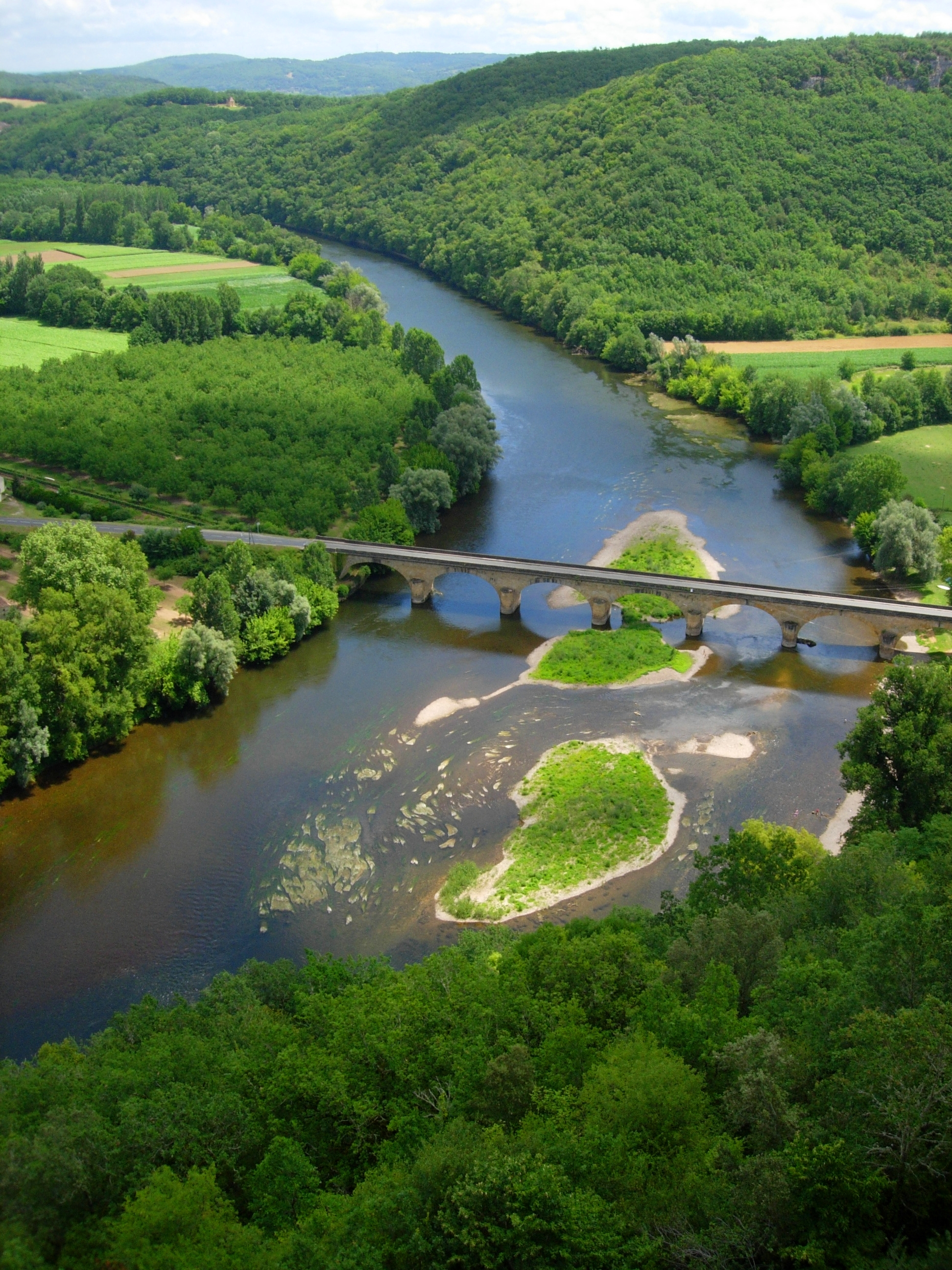
- Dordogne in Périgord, near Castelnaud-la-Chapelle

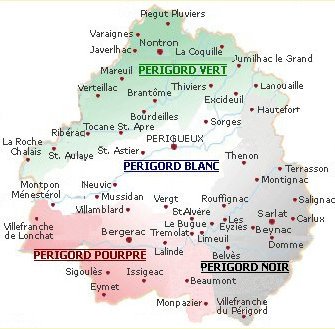
- The four regions of Périgord

- Location within France
- Coordinates: 45°11′N 0°43′E
- Country: France
- Region: Nouvelle-Aquitaine
- Department: Dordogne
- Elevation: 130 m (430 ft)

Périgord (UK: /ˈpɛrɪɡɔːr/ PERR-ig-or, US: /ˌpɛrɪˈɡɔːr/ -OR; French: [peʁiɡɔʁ]; Occitan: Peiregòrd [pejɾeˈɣɔɾ(t)] or Perigòrd [peɾiˈɣɔɾ(t)]) is a natural region and former province of France, which corresponds roughly to the current Dordogne department, now forming the northern part of the administrative region of Nouvelle-Aquitaine. It is divided into four areas called the Périgord Noir (Black), named so for the truffles that can be found there, the Périgord Blanc (White), for chalk cliffs and quarries, the Périgord Vert (Green), for forests and forestry, and the Périgord Pourpre (Purple), for wine and viticulture. The geography and natural resources of Périgord make it a region rich in history and wildlife, and the newly created Parc Naturel Régional Périgord-Limousin aims to conserve it as such.

Périgord is noted for its cuisine, especially its duck and goose products, such as confit de canard and foie gras. It is known as a centre for truffles in France. Périgourdine wines include Bergerac (red and white) and Monbazillac.

== History ==
There are Roman ruins in Périgueux which have been restored and the whole area is known as the 'cradle of mankind' due to its wealth of prehistoric sites, of which the most famous prehistoric site is the painted cave of Lascaux, whose depictions of aurochs, horses, deer and other animals (but not of humans) date back some 17,000 years. The centre of prehistoric studies is the small town of les Eyzies, home to the newly rebuilt Museum of Pre-History, where 19th century archaeological investigations established the valley of the Vézère as an unusually rich array of pre-historic sites dating back some 40,000 years. One of UNESCO's World Heritage locations, the valley contains 147 prehistoric sites dating from the Palaeolithic era and 25 decorated caves.

During the Roman conquest of Gaul, the area was organized as the territory of the Petrocorii (civitas Petrocoriorum) with its capital near modern Périgueux. This was known as Vesunna, apparently after a local Gaulish fertility goddess of the same name. Under the Roman Empire, it formed part of Gallia Aquitania and then, after the Diocletianic Reforms, Aquitania Secunda. The area was known in the early Middle Ages as the Petragoric lands (pagus Petragoricus) and then, after the 8th century, as the county of Périgord. The counts were vassals of the dukes of Aquitaine, making them part of the English Angevin Empire during the 13th century. The area was one of the main battlegrounds of the Hundred Years' War over the next two centuries. It passed into the hands of the dukes of Orléans in the 15th century, the d'Albrets in the 16th, and then finally crown land of the Kingdom of France upon the accession of Henri IV.

Owing to its contentious history, Périgord has numerous medieval castles and Renaissance chateaux, including Puymartin, Losse, Hautefort, and Beynac, Jumilhac-le-Grand, Fénelon, Biron, Bourdeilles, Castelnaud, Puyguilhem, Montastruc and Rouffiac.

== Geography ==
Périgord surrounds and is named after the préfecture (capital) of the Dordogne, Périgueux, and also includes Bergerac in the south and Sarlat in the east.

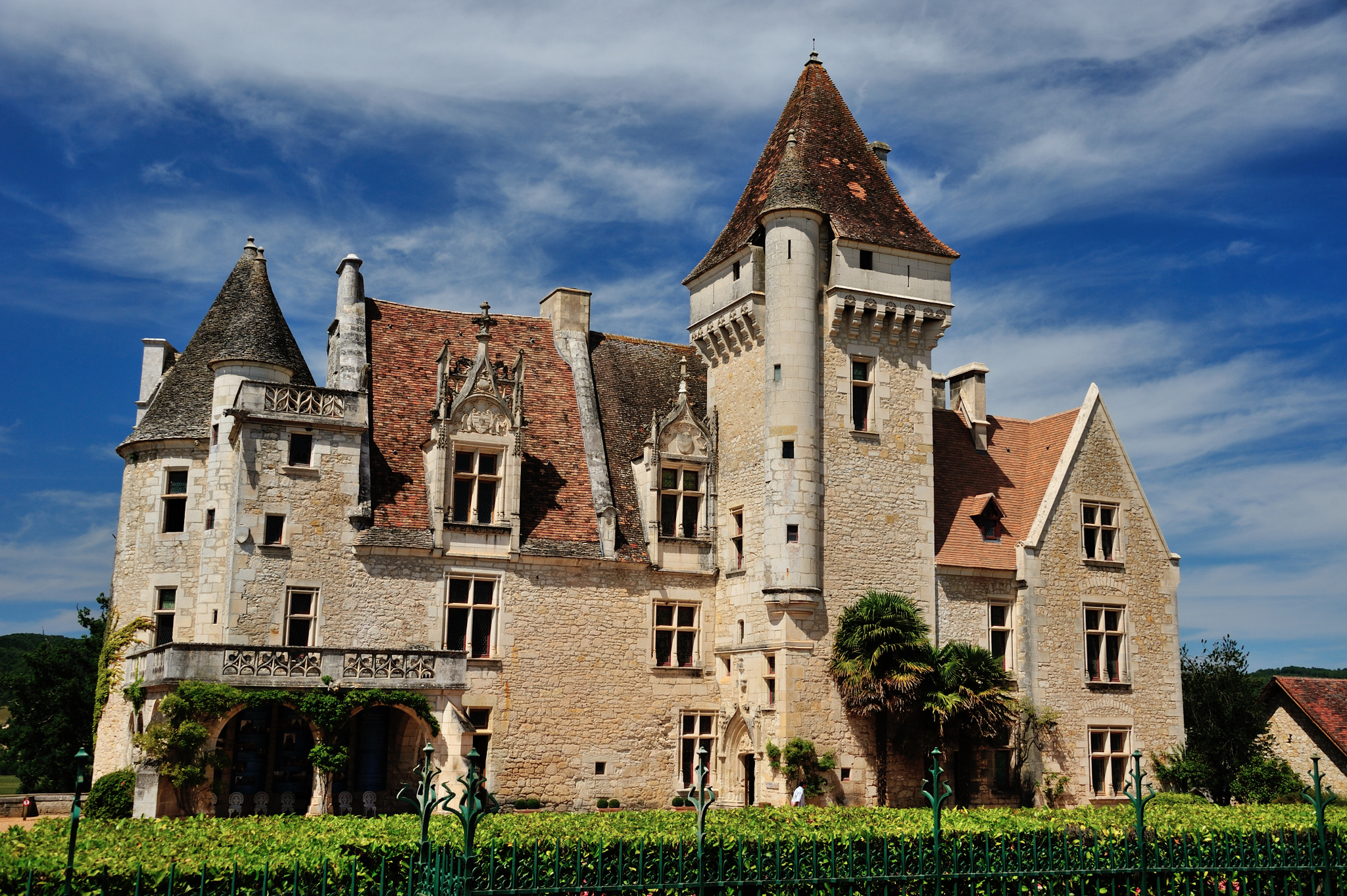
Château des Milandes in the commune of Castelnaud-la-Chapelle, built in 1489.

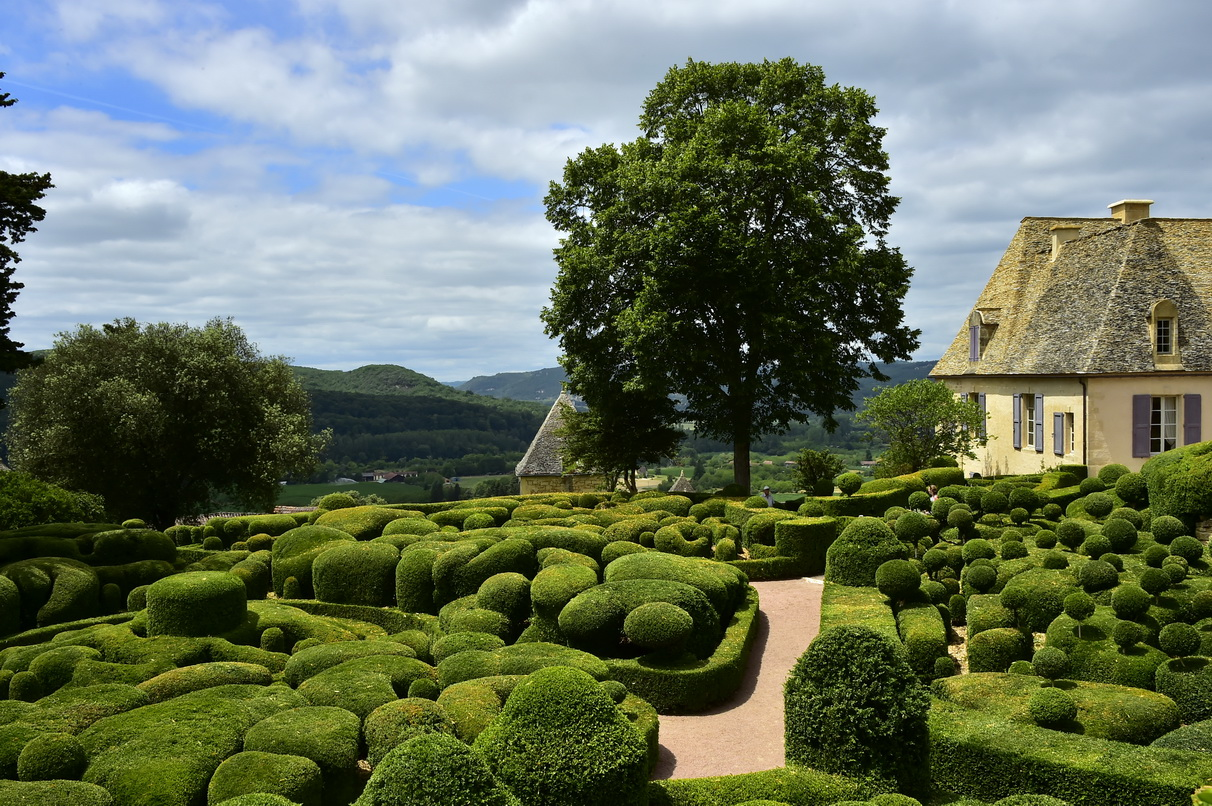
Gardens of the Château de Marqueyssac, classified amongst the Notable Gardens of France by the Committee of Parks and Gardens of the French Ministry of Culture.

== In popular culture ==
A visit to the province inspired the English novelist Julia Stuart to write her novel The Matchmaker of Périgord. Michael Crichton's novel Timeline is partially set in 1357 Périgord. Claude Chabrol filmed his classic thriller Le Boucher here in 1970, with references to Bergerac and the cinema at Sarlat. The Martin Walker crime novels featuring Bruno Courrèges, chief of police, are set in the fictional town of St. Denis on the Vézère river. In Christian Vincent's 2012 film Haute Cuisine (French title: Les Saveurs du Palais), the protagonist Hortense Laborie is a chef from Périgord. The 2013 documentary film After Winter, Spring follows the lives of family farmers in Périgord, including their struggles in the face of real estate development, government agriculture policy, and large agribusiness.

== See also ==
- Bouriane
- de Talleyrand-Périgord
- Périgordian
