= Villars, Dordogne =

Villars
- Commune
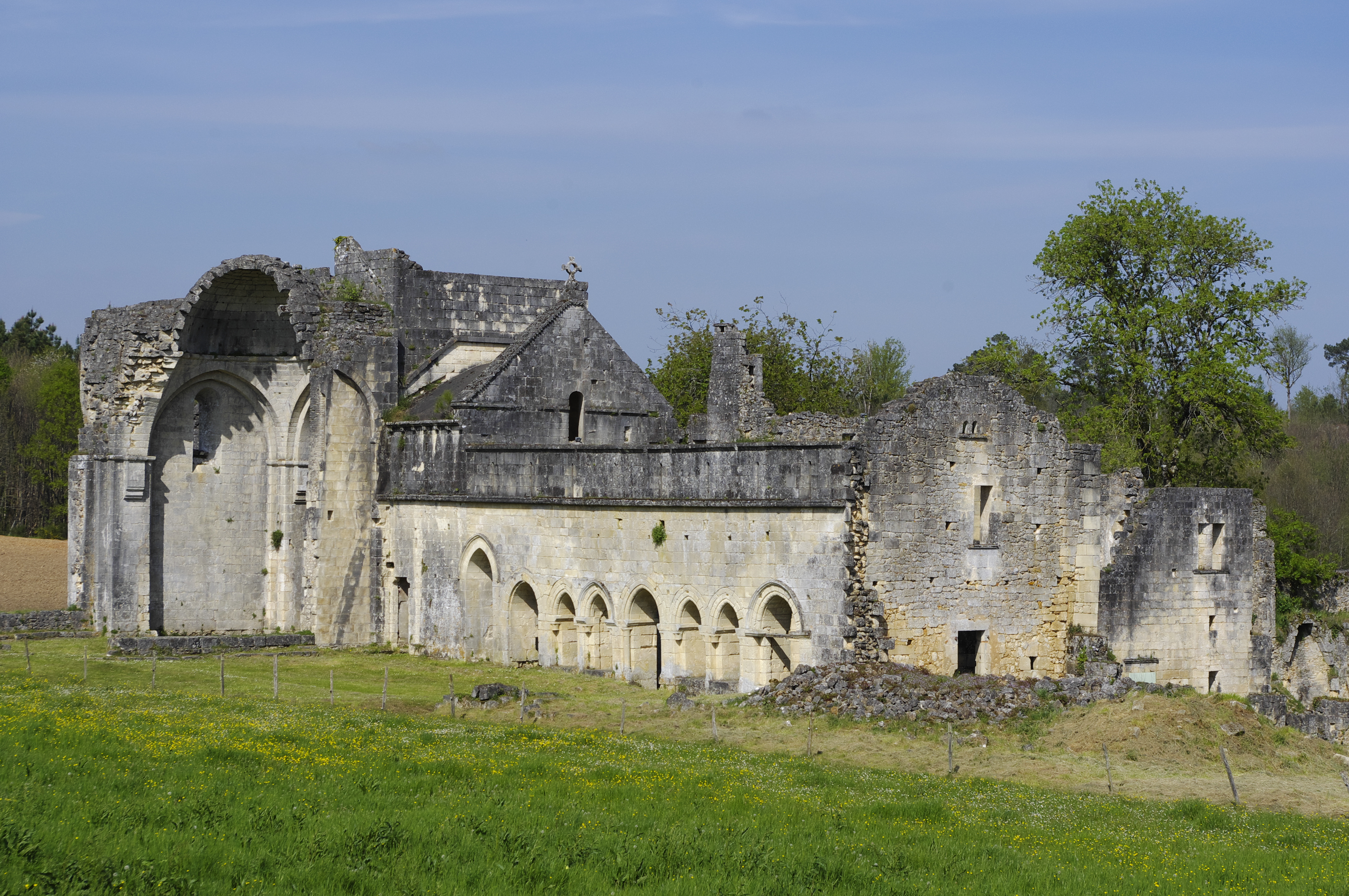
- The ruins of Boschaud abbey in Villars
- Location of Villars
- Location within France Location within Nouvelle-Aquitaine
- Coordinates: 45°25′17″N 0°45′21″E
- Country: France
- Region: Nouvelle-Aquitaine
- Department: Dordogne
- Arrondissement: Nontron
- Canton: Brantôme en Périgord

Government
  - Mayor (2020–2026): Jacky Faye
- Area^{1}: 27.67 km^{2} (10.68 sq mi)
- Elevation: 225 m (738 ft)
- Highest elevation: 240 m (790 ft)
- Lowest elevation: 125 m (410 ft)
- Population (2023): 470
  - Density: 17/km^{2} (44/sq mi)
- Time zone: UTC+01:00 (CET)
  - Summer (DST): UTC+02:00 (CEST)
- INSEE/Postal code: 24582 /24530
- ^{1} French Land Register data, which excludes lakes, ponds, glaciers > 1 km^{2} (0.386 sq mi or 247 acres) and river estuaries.

Villars (French pronunciation: [vilaʁ]; Occitan: Vilars) is a commune in the Dordogne department in Nouvelle-Aquitaine in southwestern France. Nearby towns include Brantôme and Nontron.

Villars' attractions include the Château de Puyguilhem, Grotte de Villars and the Abbaye de Boschaud.

== Population ==
Historical population
Year	Pop.	±% p.a.
1968	735	—
1975	647	−1.81%
1982	586	−1.40%
1990	568	−0.39%
1999	526	−0.85%
2007	484	−1.03%
2012	471	−0.54%
2017	463	−0.34%
2023	470	+0.25%
Source: INSEE

== See also ==
- Communes of the Dordogne department
