= Gourdon, Lot =

Gourdon Gordon (Occitan)
- Subprefecture and commune
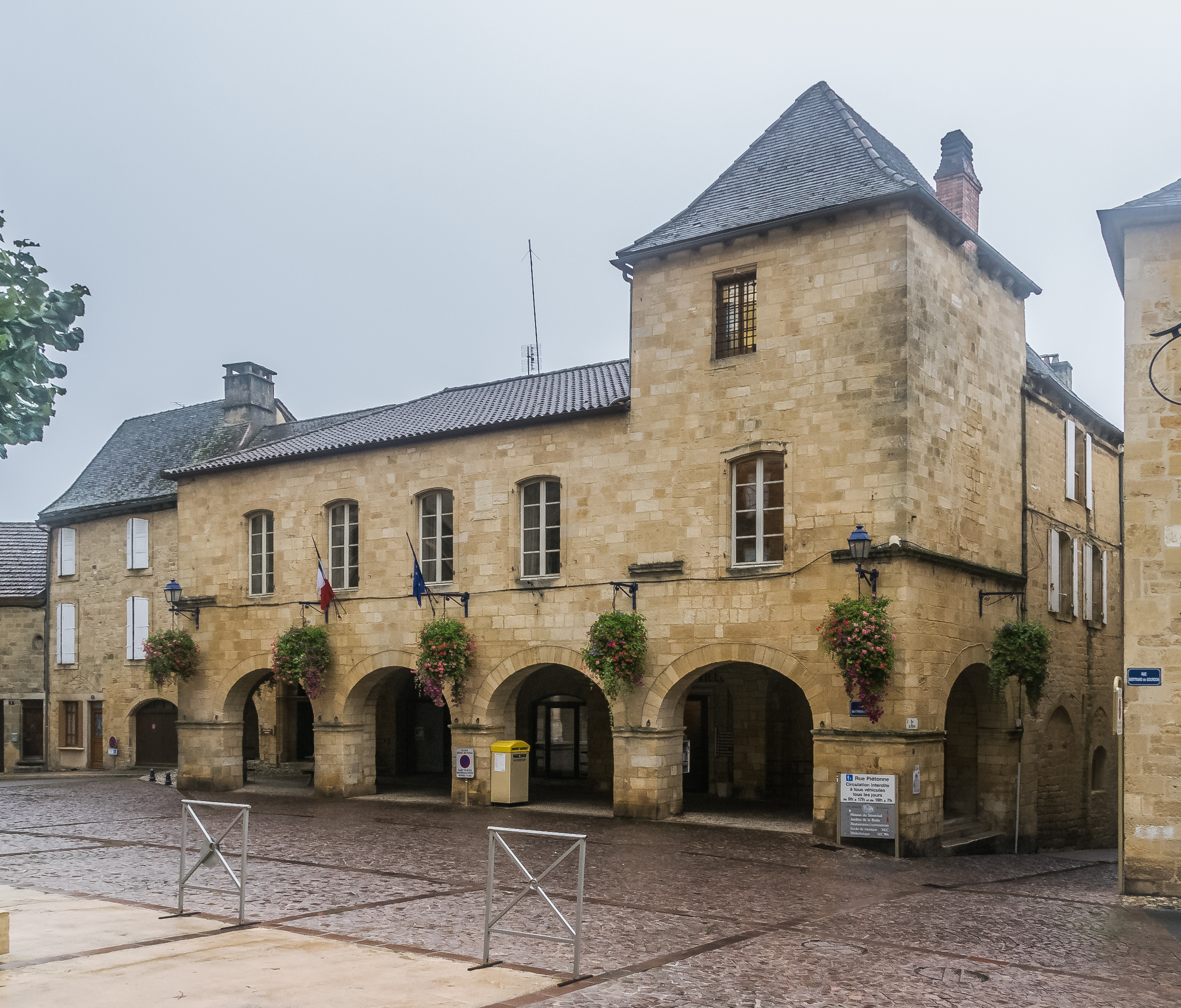
- Gourdon Town Hall

- Coat of arms
- Location of Gourdon
- Location within France Location within Occitanie
- Coordinates: 44°44′14″N 1°22′57″E
- Country: France
- Region: Occitania
- Department: Lot
- Arrondissement: Gourdon
- Canton: Gourdon

Government
  - Mayor (2020–2026): Jean-Marie Courtin
- Area^{1}: 45.52 km^{2} (17.58 sq mi)
- Elevation: 263 m (863 ft)
- Highest elevation: 323 m (1,060 ft)
- Lowest elevation: 130 m (430 ft)
- Population (2023): 4,206
  - Density: 92.40/km^{2} (239.3/sq mi)
- Time zone: UTC+01:00 (CET)
  - Summer (DST): UTC+02:00 (CEST)
- INSEE/Postal code: 46127 /46300
- ^{1} French Land Register data, which excludes lakes, ponds, glaciers > 1 km^{2} (0.386 sq mi or 247 acres) and river estuaries.

Gourdon (French pronunciation: [ɡuʁdɔ̃]; Occitan: Gordon) is a commune and subprefecture of the Lot department in the Occitania region in Southwestern France. As of 2023, the population of the commune was 4,206.

The small town, not far from Rocamadour, is situated close to the Dordogne department in the Nouvelle-Aquitaine region. Gourdon has a rich prehistoric past, that can still be seen today through a high concentration of prehistoric sites. It is the capital of the Bouriane, the natural region part of the Quercy, which extends up to the river Dordogne and neighbours the Périgord.

== Geography ==
The town lies in the middle of the commune, above the right bank of the Bléou, a stream tributary of the Céou, which forms most of the commune's southern border. Gourdon station has rail connections to Brive-la-Gaillarde, Cahors and Toulouse.

=== Climate ===
Climate data for Gourdon, elevation: 260 m (850 ft) (1991–2020 normals, extremes 1961–present)
| Month | Jan | Feb | Mar | Apr | May | Jun | Jul | Aug | Sep | Oct | Nov | Dec | Year |
|---|---|---|---|---|---|---|---|---|---|---|---|---|---|
| Record high °C (°F) | 19.9 (67.8) | 25.2 (77.4) | 27.5 (81.5) | 31.3 (88.3) | 34.4 (93.9) | 40.7 (105.3) | 40.7 (105.3) | 41.8 (107.2) | 36.8 (98.2) | 33.1 (91.6) | 24.5 (76.1) | 19.4 (66.9) | 41.8 (107.2) |
| Mean daily maximum °C (°F) | 9.0 (48.2) | 10.8 (51.4) | 14.8 (58.6) | 17.7 (63.9) | 21.5 (70.7) | 25.2 (77.4) | 27.6 (81.7) | 27.8 (82.0) | 23.7 (74.7) | 18.9 (66.0) | 12.6 (54.7) | 9.5 (49.1) | 18.3 (64.9) |
| Daily mean °C (°F) | 5.5 (41.9) | 6.2 (43.2) | 9.5 (49.1) | 12.0 (53.6) | 15.6 (60.1) | 19.0 (66.2) | 21.0 (69.8) | 21.2 (70.2) | 17.6 (63.7) | 14.1 (57.4) | 8.8 (47.8) | 6.1 (43.0) | 13.1 (55.6) |
| Mean daily minimum °C (°F) | 2.0 (35.6) | 1.7 (35.1) | 4.2 (39.6) | 6.4 (43.5) | 9.6 (49.3) | 12.8 (55.0) | 14.5 (58.1) | 14.5 (58.1) | 11.4 (52.5) | 9.3 (48.7) | 5.0 (41.0) | 2.6 (36.7) | 7.8 (46.0) |
| Record low °C (°F) | −19.0 (−2.2) | −14.2 (6.4) | −12.8 (9.0) | −4.8 (23.4) | −1.4 (29.5) | 1.8 (35.2) | 5.7 (42.3) | 3.8 (38.8) | 0.6 (33.1) | −4.7 (23.5) | −9.0 (15.8) | −13.2 (8.2) | −19.0 (−2.2) |
| Average precipitation mm (inches) | 64.7 (2.55) | 50.8 (2.00) | 61.0 (2.40) | 82.6 (3.25) | 82.2 (3.24) | 76.2 (3.00) | 54.7 (2.15) | 63.2 (2.49) | 73.7 (2.90) | 70.5 (2.78) | 76.2 (3.00) | 67.2 (2.65) | 823.0 (32.40) |
| Average precipitation days (≥ 1.0 mm) | 10.7 | 9.1 | 10.2 | 11.2 | 11.1 | 8.7 | 6.7 | 7.7 | 8.9 | 10.0 | 11.4 | 11.0 | 116.8 |
| Average snowy days | 2.3 | 2.2 | 1.6 | 0.8 | 0.0 | 0.0 | 0.0 | 0.0 | 0.0 | 0.1 | 1.0 | 1.9 | 9.9 |
| Average relative humidity (%) | 84 | 78 | 74 | 70 | 73 | 73 | 70 | 73 | 76 | 81 | 84 | 85 | 76.8 |
| Mean monthly sunshine hours | 92.0 | 119.7 | 169.5 | 180.5 | 213.6 | 241.8 | 264.7 | 252.1 | 208.6 | 148.6 | 95.2 | 90.0 | 2,076 |
Source 1: Meteociel
Source 2: Infoclimat.fr (humidity and snowy days, 1961–1990)

== Demographics ==
Historical population
| Year | Pop. | ±% p.a. |
|---|---|---|
| 1968 | 4,803 | — |
| 1975 | 4,728 | −0.22% |
| 1982 | 4,899 | +0.51% |
| 1990 | 4,851 | −0.12% |
| 1999 | 4,882 | +0.07% |
| 2007 | 4,636 | −0.64% |
| 2012 | 4,406 | −1.01% |
| 2017 | 4,094 | −1.46% |
| 2023 | 4,206 | +0.45% |
Source: INSEE

== Monuments ==
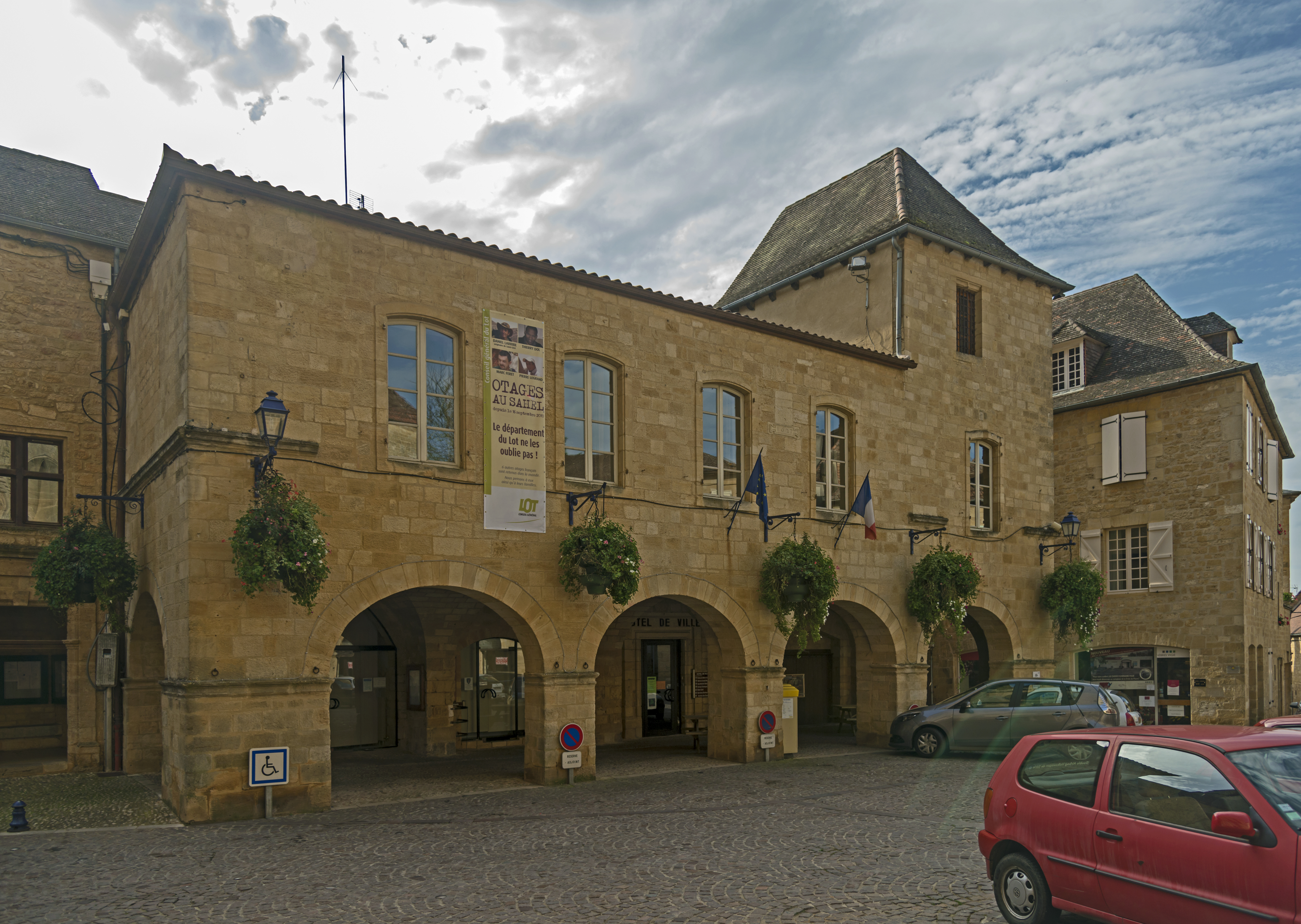
Town Hall

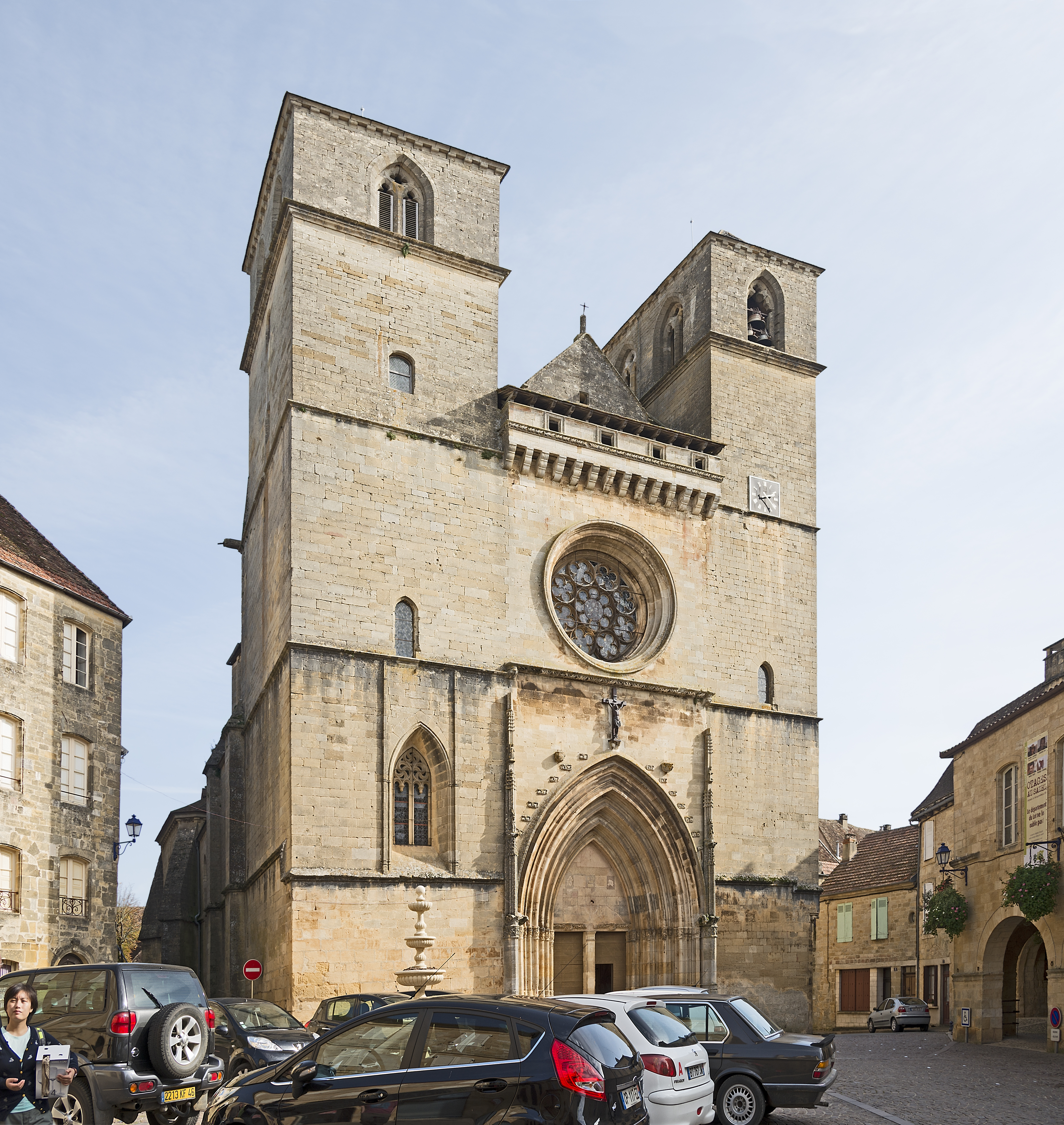
St. Peter Church facade

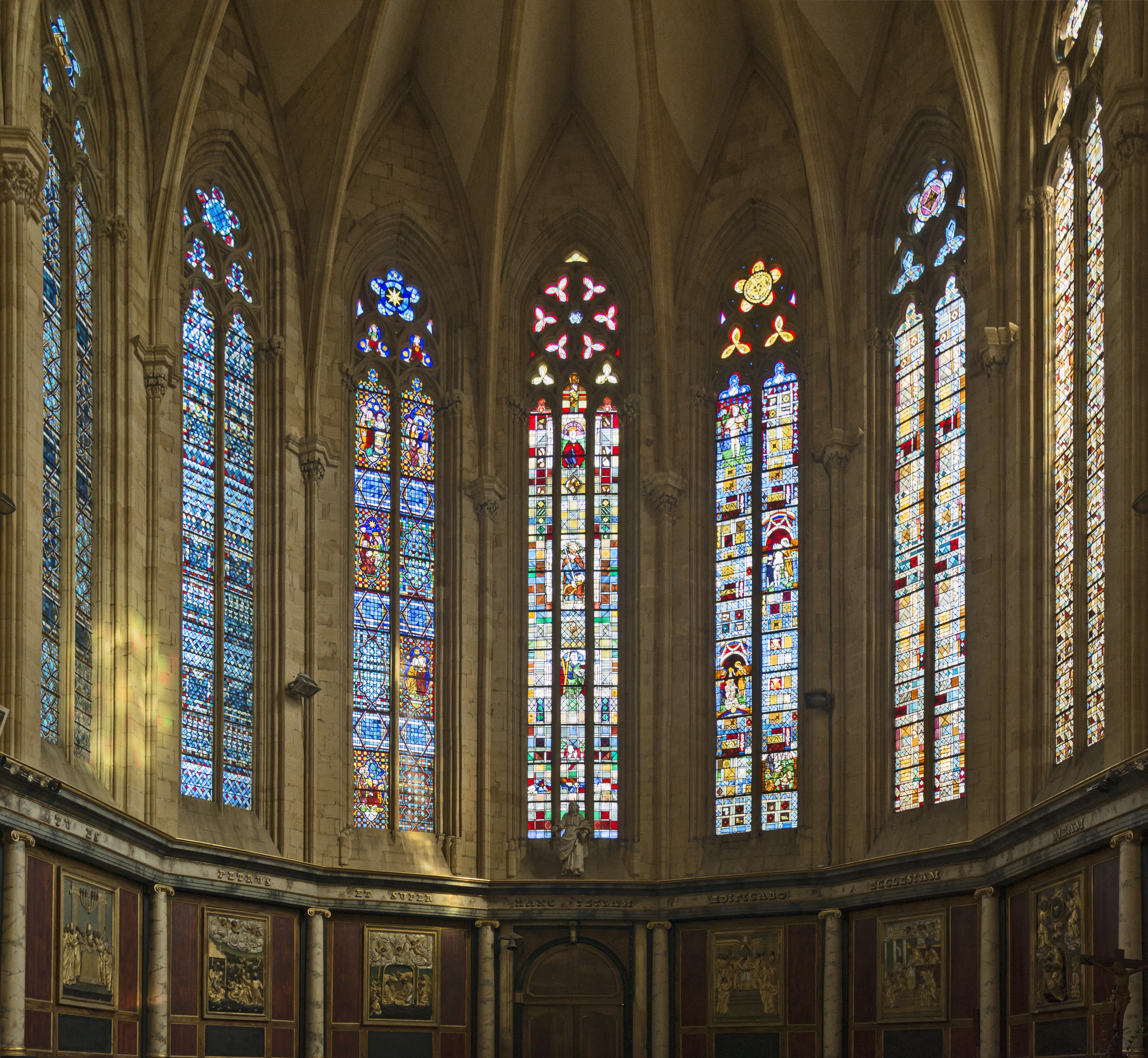
St. Peter Church interior

== See also ==
- Communes of the Lot department
- Sauveterrian
