= Villars Cave =

French site containing prehistoric art

- Grotte du Cluzeau
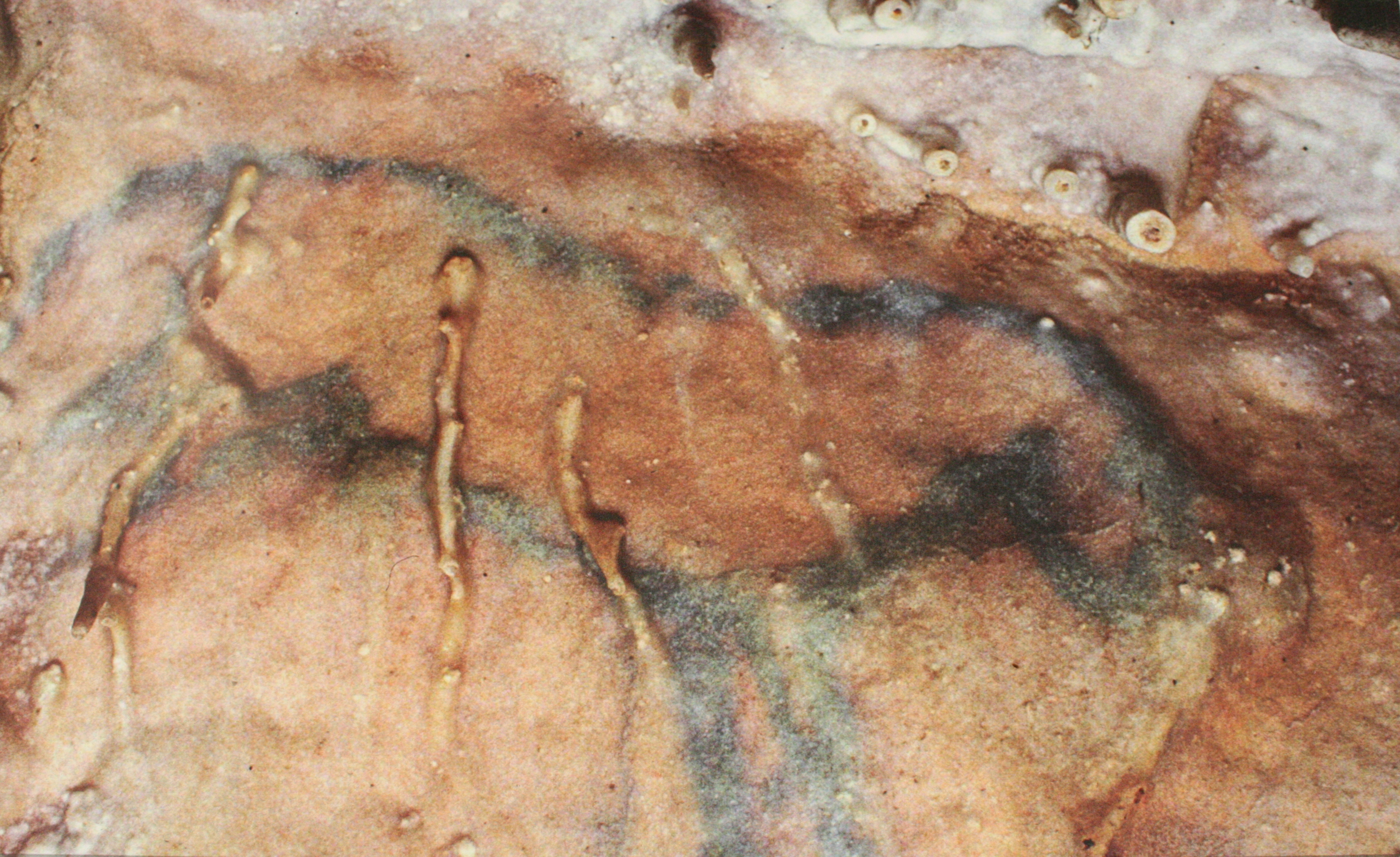
- Petit Cheval Bleu

- location in Nouvelle-Aquitaine, France
- 45°26′32.1″N 0°47′6.6″E
- Periods: late Upper Paleolithic
- Cultures: Magdalenian
- Location: Villars, Nouvelle-Aquitaine, France

History
- Built: c. 18,000 years ago
- Abandoned: c. 17,000 years ago

Site notes
- Discovered: December 1953

The Villars Cave, in French Grotte de Villars or Grotte du Cluzeau, was occupied during the Lower Magdalenian by Cro-Magnon hunter-gatherers. The cave is part of the French commune of Villars in the northern Dordogne département. Besides its enormous wealth in beautiful stalactites, stalagmites and similar calcite deposits it contains cave paintings and some engravings. The Villars Cave and the Rouffignac Cave are the biggest known cave systems in the Dordogne.

== Geography and geology ==
The Villars Cave is situated 3.5 kilometres to the northeast of Villars and about 500 metres to the north-northeast of the hamlet Le Cluzeau. It can be accessed via the D 82 from Villars to Saint-Saud-Lacoussière; after a right-turn at Le Cluzeau one crosses the hamlet and reaches the ample parking area on a hill. The entry of the cave is at 170 metres above sea level, somewhat below the parking area along the left-hand slope of the little stream Ruisseau de l'Étang Rompu, a left-hand tributary of the Trincou River. The cave was formed by karstic phenomena affecting the outcropping oolithic limestones of Upper Bajocian (Jurassic) age. On the other side of the valley arrives a southeast-trending fault which most likely disrupted the cohesion of the local strata and triggered the erosional shaping of the similar oriented cave system by carbon dioxide-laden waters during the Quaternary.

== Discovery ==
The Villars Cave was discovered in December 1953 by members of the Spéléo Club de Périgueux after their attention was drawn to a fox hole exuding steam. They enlarged the hole and thus found the entry to the enormous cave system. In 1956, the first scratch marks of cave bears were noticed along the entry passage. Yet the cave paintings were only recognized later in 1957 by Pierre Vidal, a member of the speleology club.

The art work was then investigated and approved of by the expert archeologist Henri Breuil. In 1959, the cave was opened for the first time to the public.

Besides Breuil further scientific investigations were carried out in 1958 by André Glory and François Bordes, who were followed in 1959 by André Leroi-Gourhan and by Brigitte and Gilles Delluc in 1970.

== Description ==
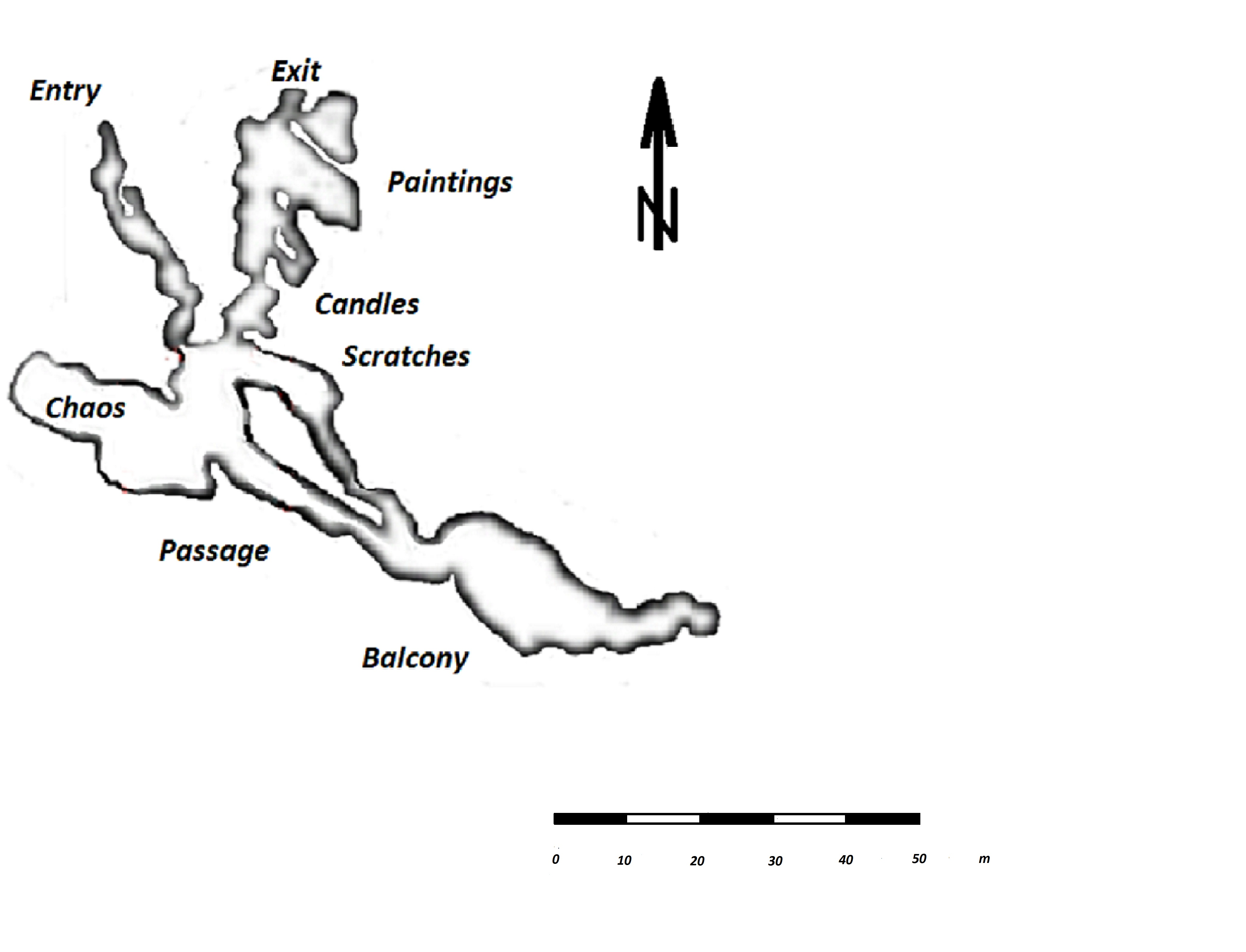
Outline of the show cave with its different rooms

The show cave is about 600 metres long and consists of several rooms connected by passageways. The cave system not open to the public continues on different levels for nearly another 13 kilometres. The Villars Cave is therefore together with the Rouffignac Cave the most extensive cave system known in the Dordogne.

The not ornate part of the cave beginning right behind the entry excels in stalactites and stalagmites, pillars (i.e. coalesced stalactites and stalagmites), curtains and draperies of all sorts, wall coatings, so called maccaronis (thin, hollow stalactites) and large saucers (in French: gours).

A steep stone staircase, not suitable for people in wheel-chairs, leads down to the new entry which is somewhat below and farther to the northwest then the original one. A 40-metre-long, south-southeast-striking entry passage (galerie d'accés) leads to the crossing (carrefour) where three different passageways diverge from. The branch on the right follows a southeasterly direction and is 130 meters long. It is a combination of rooms and passageways, which begins with the salle de bénitiers (holy water fonts room ), continues in the fairly narrow le passage (passage) and ends in the grand balcon (great balcony) with the grand stalagmite (big stalagmite). The salle de bénitiers also prolongs to the northwest into the salle du chaos (chaos room). The left branch leads to the northeast and north-northeast into the ornate part of the cave. It starts with the 10-metre-long salle des cierges (candle room) where the first paintings were noticed, followed by the 30-metre-long salle des peintures (painting room) with most of the art work. At its far northeastern end is the exit. The 50-metre-long middle branch leads just before the candle room also to the southeast. After the salle des griffades (scratch room) the passage swings into a south-southeasterly direction and therefore meets up again with the right-hand branch just before the great balcony.

=== Entry passage ===
On the right hand side of the entry passage the scratch marks of cave bears can be seen. Also some painted dots and traits can be noticed either occurring individually or grouped in clusters.

=== Holy water fonts room ===
This first room along the right-hand passageway can be reached right after the crossing via a descending slope. It contains besides stalactites and stalagmites also two fairly big saucers which have given it its name.

=== Chaos room ===
In the 30-metre-long and 15-metre-wide chaos room a partial collapse of the ceiling has happened so that big limestone blocks and slabs were covering the floor. Subsequently, the chaos was covered in fairly thick and massive calcite concretions. From the more elevated west end of the adjoining salle des bénitiers one has an impressive view of the room.

=== Candle room ===
Along the left-hand branch the candle room – named after its stalagmites (candles) – also contains dots and traits but mainly features with some art work like a 40 centimetre bison, the head of a horse and a bovine. The room ends in a very narrow passageway that was later enlarged to facilitate the entry to the painting room, which meant that some concretionary deposits had to be sacrificed.

=== Painting room ===
The painting room exhibits most of the art work. It is most famous for the fresque de chevaux (horse fresco), the petit cheval bleu (little blue horse) and the l'homme et le bison (man and bison). Yet it also contains exuberant and partially intergrown calcitic deposits.

== Findings ==
Altogether 30 paintings have been discovered, their size not exceeding 50 centimetres. The paintings were drawn in black manganese oxide bound by animal grease. Later on the paintings were naturally covered by a thin, milky calcite coating which renders the traits in blue (like the famous little blue horse of Villars). Yet at the same time the coating has protected the art work from external influences and the Villars Cave does not seem to have the problems that affected Lascaux. Besides the paintings some engravings are also present, as well as abstract female silhouettes, red dots painted with ochre and some very abstract geometrical signs like staffs, crosses and hooked symbols. The geometrical signs are very difficult to interpret.

Besides horses, bovines, bisons, capricorns and a deer head, a human figure attacked by a bison is depicted. The latter resembles a similar scene found in the well of Lascaux (scene du puits).

Cro-Magnon man's presence has left a few traces like knocked over calcite concretions and broken stalagmites. Some lost or discarded utensils have also been found – to name silex flakes, bone fragments (mainly from reindeer), a reindeer antler and ochre and manganese oxide fragments for painting together with cup-shaped calcite deposits used as receptacles.

== Age ==
According to Leroi-Gourhan, the art work can be attributed stylistically to the second period of his style III which correlates with the Older Magdalenian. This represents in absolute terms roughly 17,000 years BP.

Absolute age dating with the radiocarbon method was done by Michel Genty on a burnt tooth found in a fireplace below the man and bison. He found a result of 18,000 years BP for the tooth.

The close stylistic resemblance of the man and bison scene with similar depictions in Lascaux and in Roc-de-Sers also indicates an age range of 18,000 to 17,000 years BP.

== See also ==
- Lascaux
- Rouffignac Cave

== Literature ==
- Delluc, B. & Delluc, G.(1974): La grotte ornée de Villars (Dordogne). Gallia-Préhistoire, 17, p. 1-67
- Glory, A. & Pierret, B.(1960): La grotte ornée de Villars, Bulletin de la Société Préhistorique Française, 57, p. 355-361
- Pierret, B. (1969): Villars, caverne périgourdine, Bernard et Lalorette, Périgueux
