= Bouriane =

Coordinates: 44°44′N 1°22′E

- Natural region
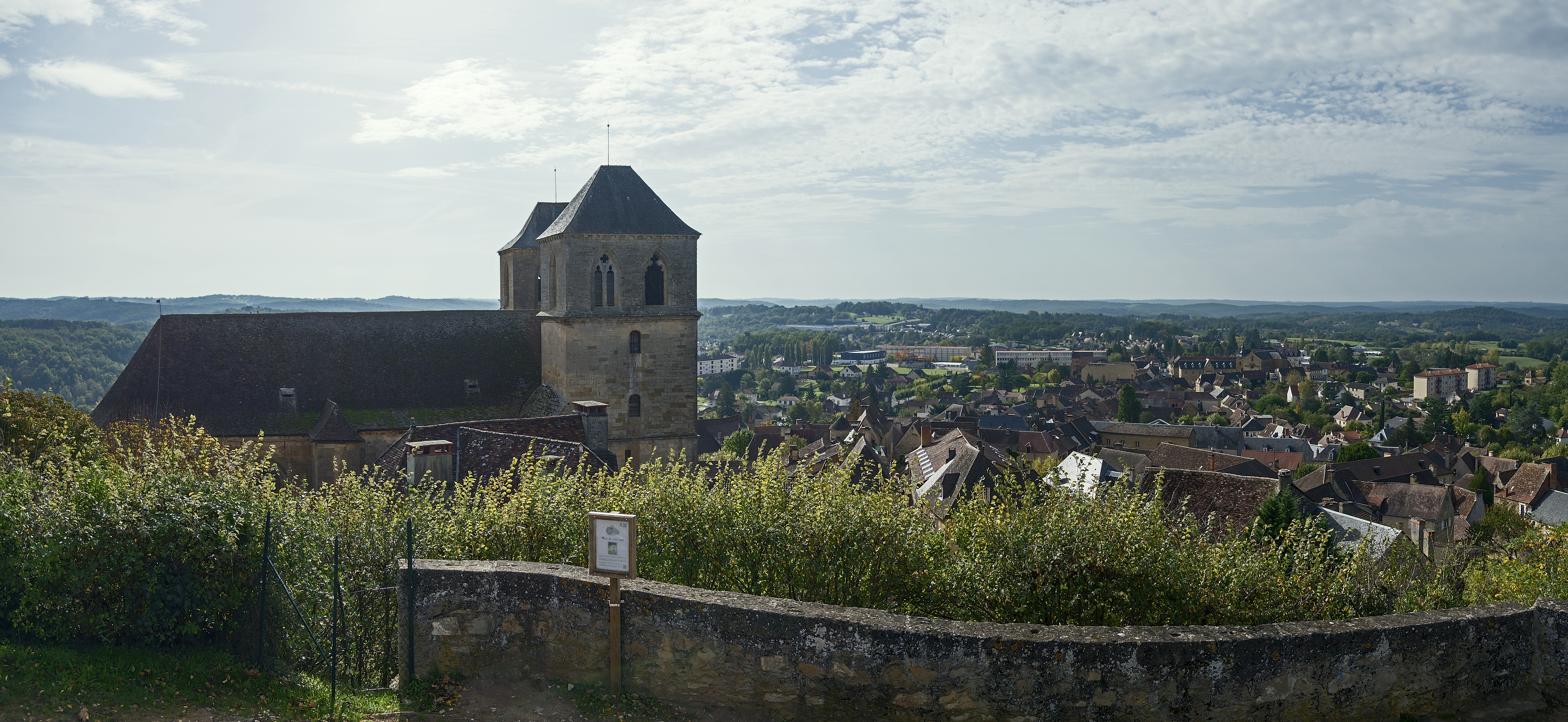
- Bouriane landscape around Gourdon

- A map of the Lot showing the group of Quercy / Bouriane communes in red
- Country: France
- Elevation: 230 m (750 ft)

Bouriane (Occitan: Borian) is a natural region of France located in the department of Lot, but with a smaller part in Lot-et-Garonne. Its capital is the small town of Gourdon.

== History ==
Historically, Bouriane was part of the Quercy, an ancient province which extends up to the river Dordogne and neighbours the Périgord. The region is characterized by its sandy soils and gentle hills covered with forests where chestnut trees predominate.

== Features of the region ==
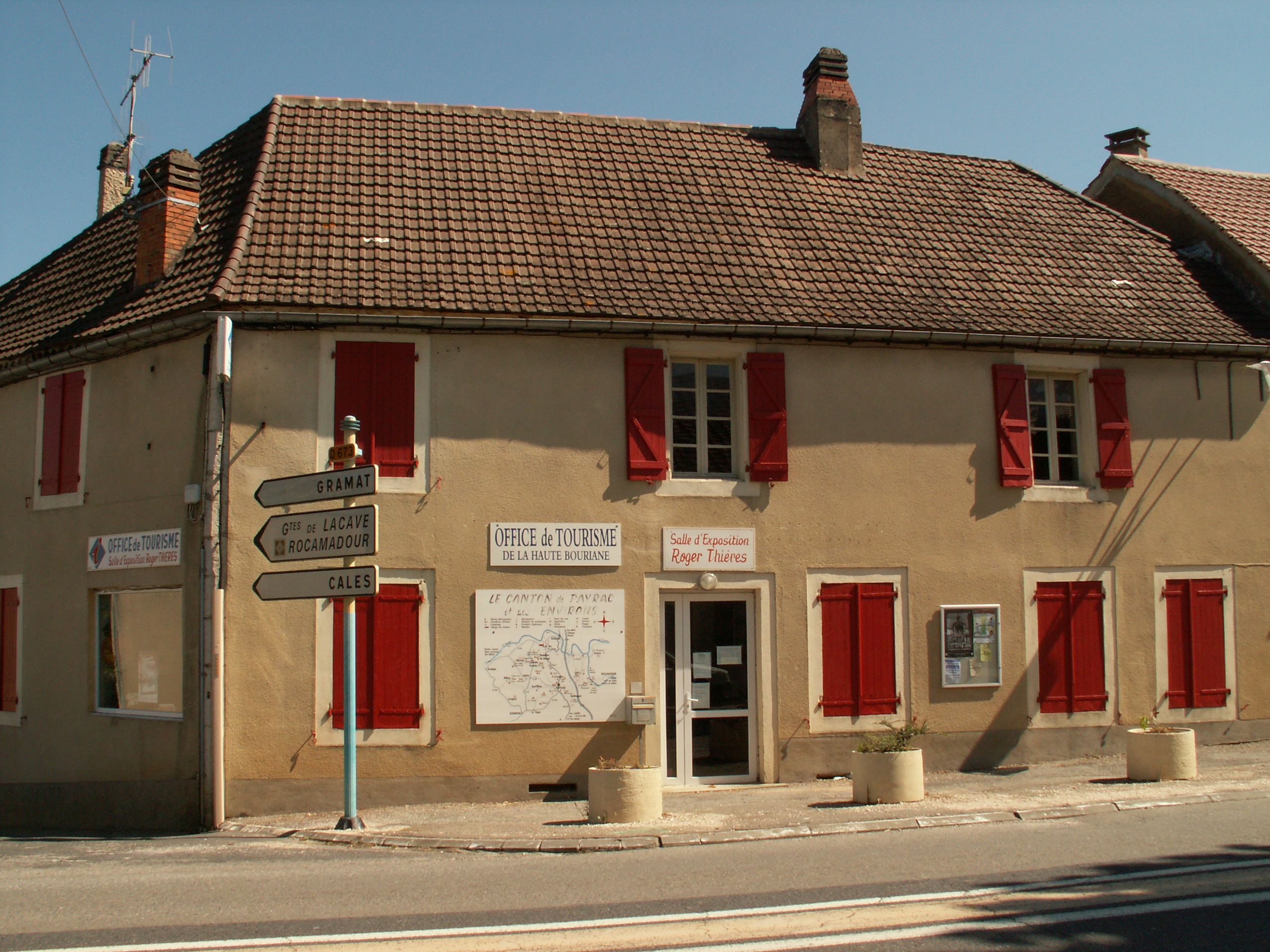
Haute Bouriane tourist office building

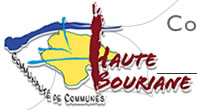
Logo of the Haute Bouriane region
