= Château de Puyguilhem (Villars) =

Castle in France

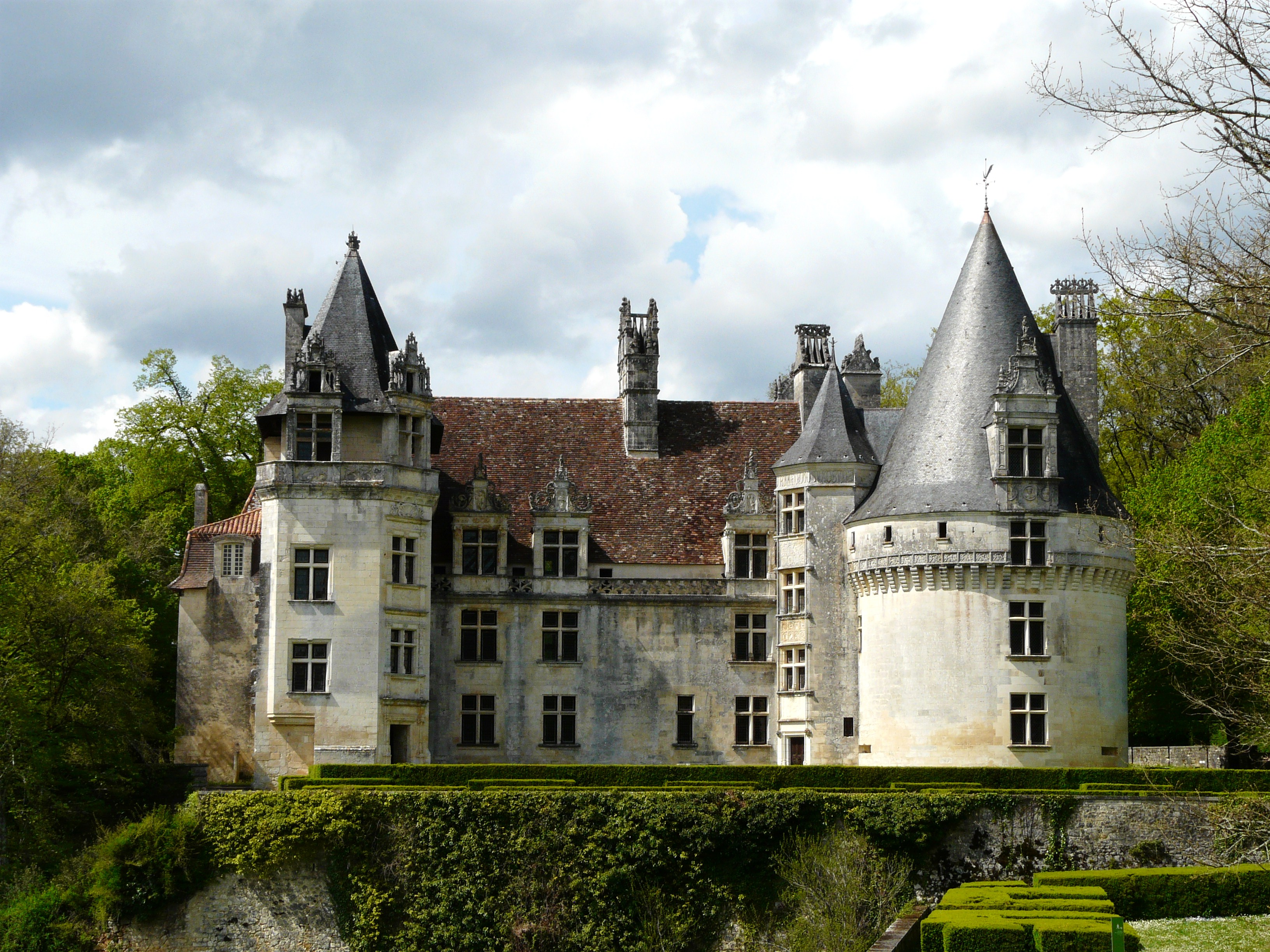

- Location within France
- 45°25′33″N 0°44′40″E
- Location: Villars, Dordogne, France

History
- Built: 1514 to 1535

Site notes
- Architectural styles: Renaissance and Gothic architecture
- Governing body: Ministère de la Culture
- Owner: France
- Website: http://www.chateau-puyguilhem.fr/en/

The Château de Puyguilhem, also called Puyguilhem Castle, is a château in the commune of Villars in north of the Dordogne, France. Built between 1514 and 1535, the Renaissance style castle like that of the Loire castles was classified as a historical monument on 20 March 1912 and the grounds, woods, and outskirts were registered on 19 May 1945. It is owned by the state of France. It is open to the public.

== History ==
The construction of the castle of Puyguilhem began in 1514, sponsored by Mondot de La Marthonie, first president of the Parliament of Paris. A close friend of Francis I of France and lawyer to the king's mother Louise of Savoy, he administered the kingdom when the king went to war. The modest castle was built as a secondary residence and hunting lodge for La Marthonie and its layout is fitting for a nobleman of the time.

Formerly protected by defensive works, it now consists of a main house flanked by two towers and a turret of stairs. The first of two stages of construction was completed in 1524, which included the foundations, part of the corner tower and the hexagonal turret. The second stage was completed in 1535. Its design oscillates between two epochs, medieval and renaissance. Several elements recall the Gothic style of the Middle Ages, while the additions made in the second phase of construction are like the Loire castles. The park contains a dovecote.

The castle fell into ruin and in 1939 the state of France took ownership and restored the building. Since February 2008, it has been managed by the Centre des monuments nationaux (Center of National Monuments).

== Gallery ==
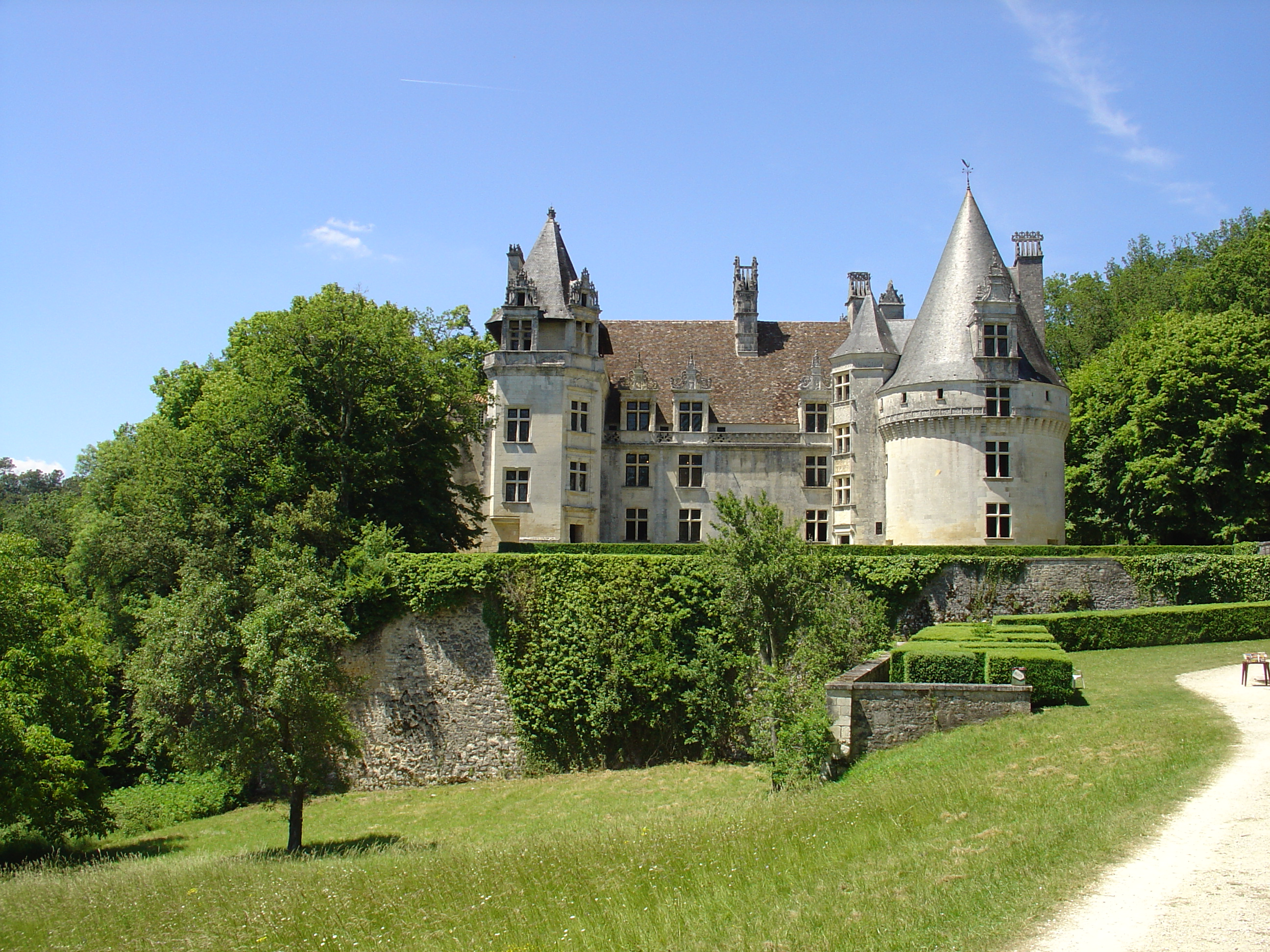
The entrance to the castle

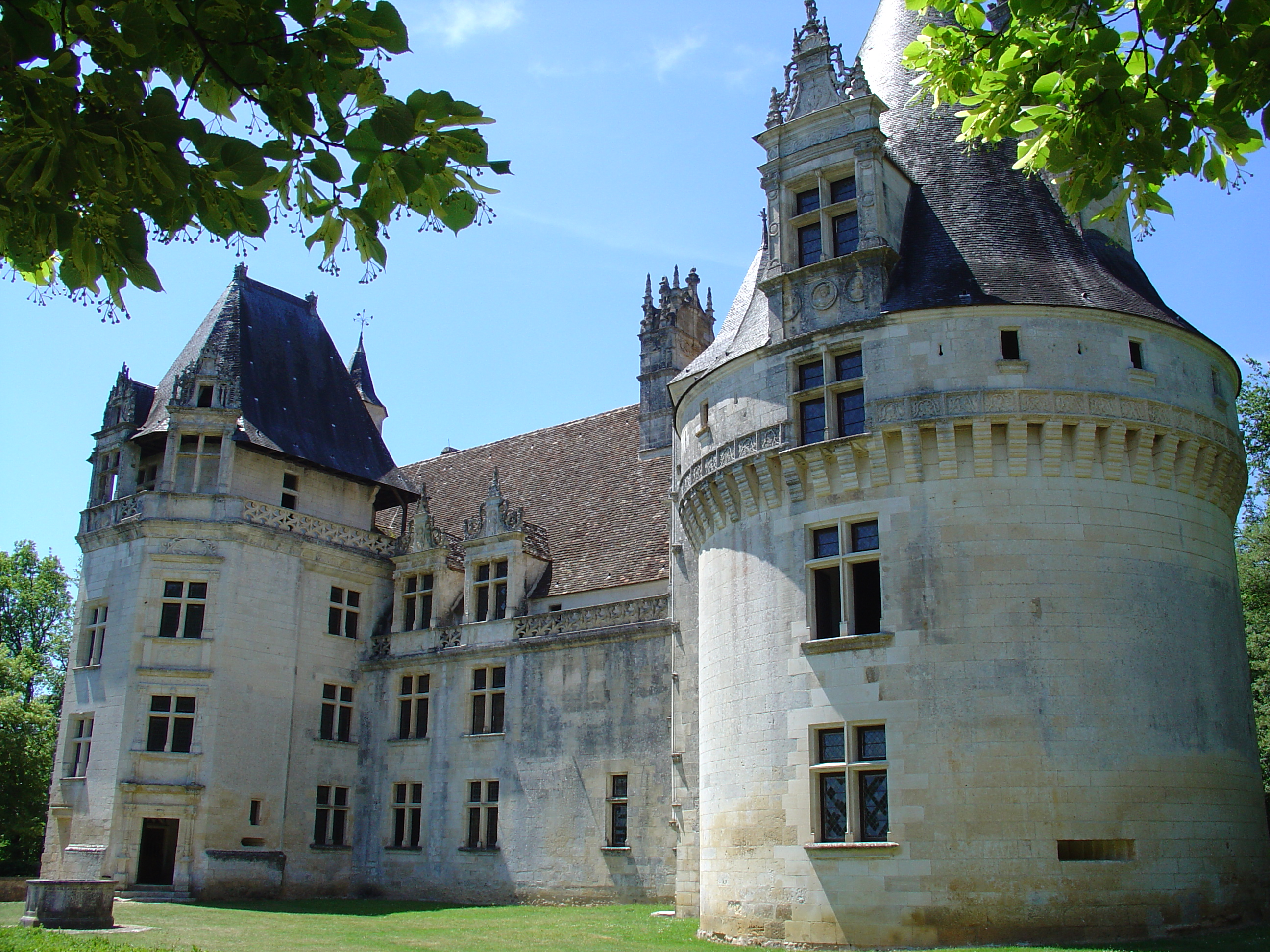
The main façade

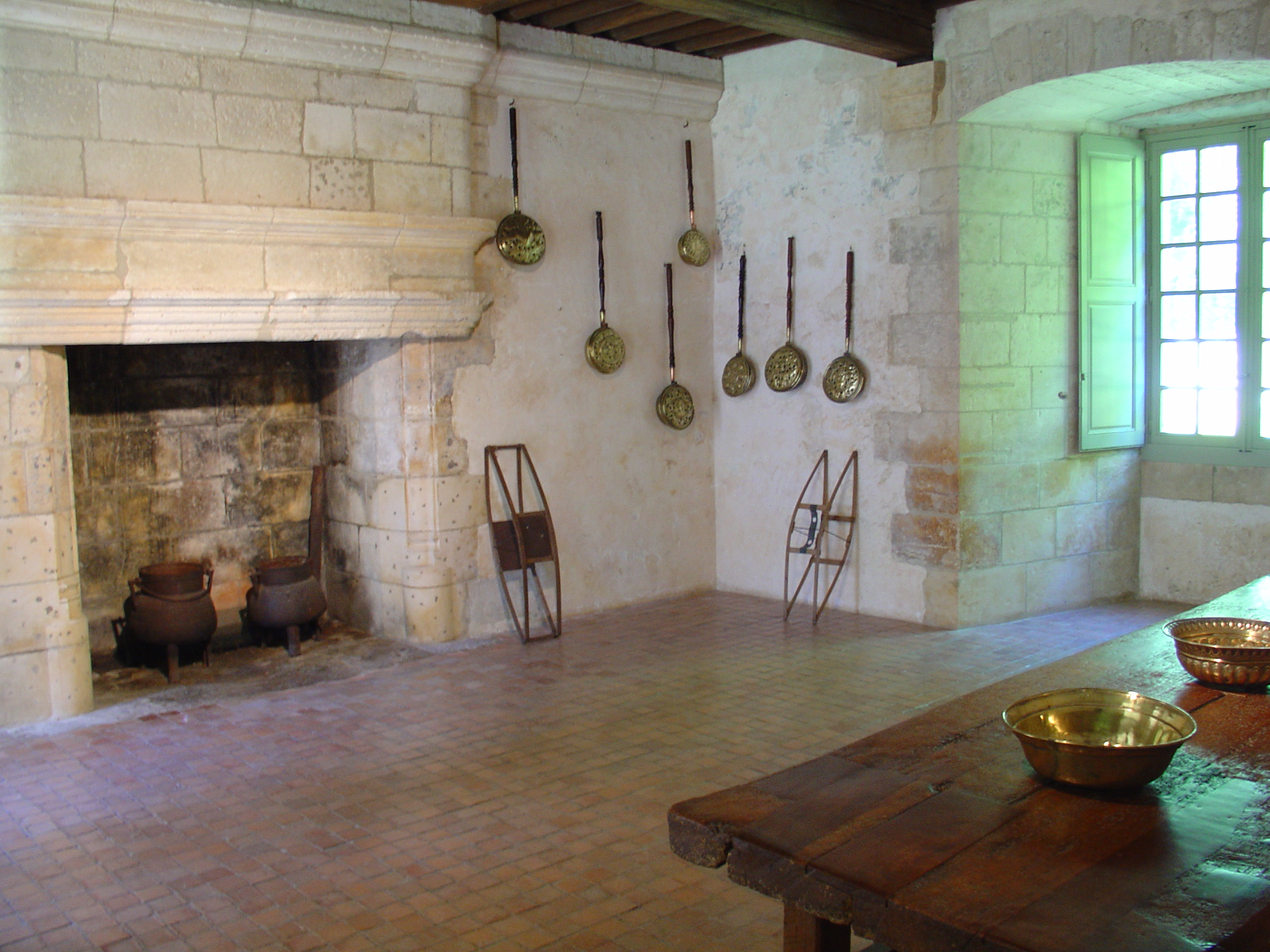
The kitchen

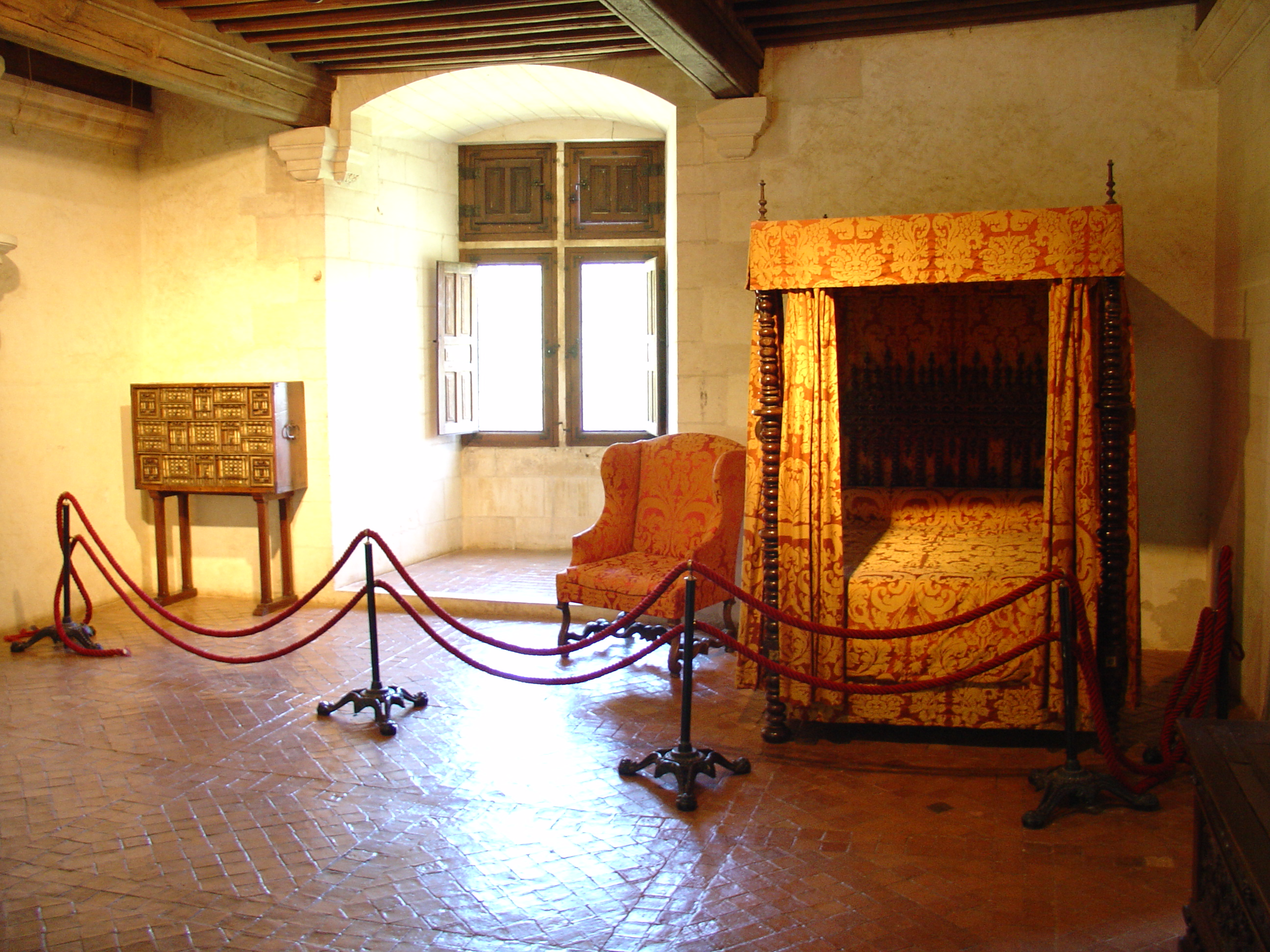
A bedroom

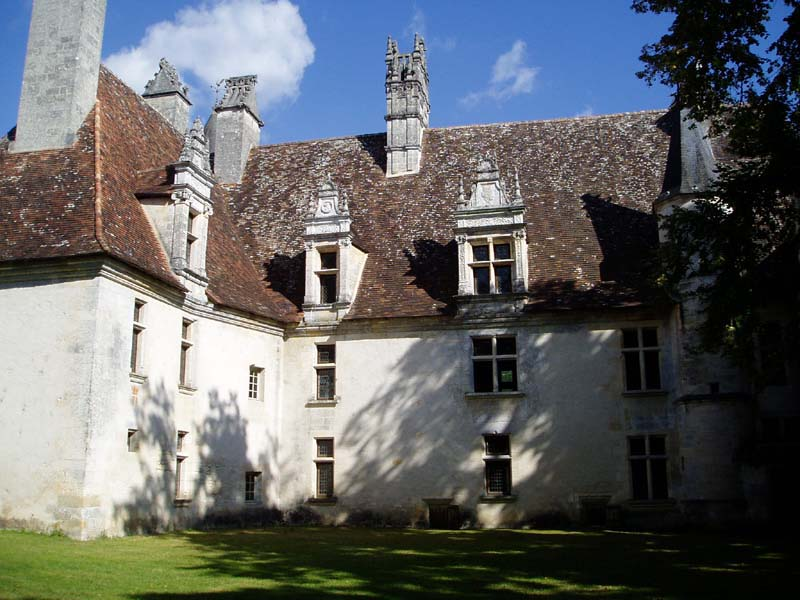
The back

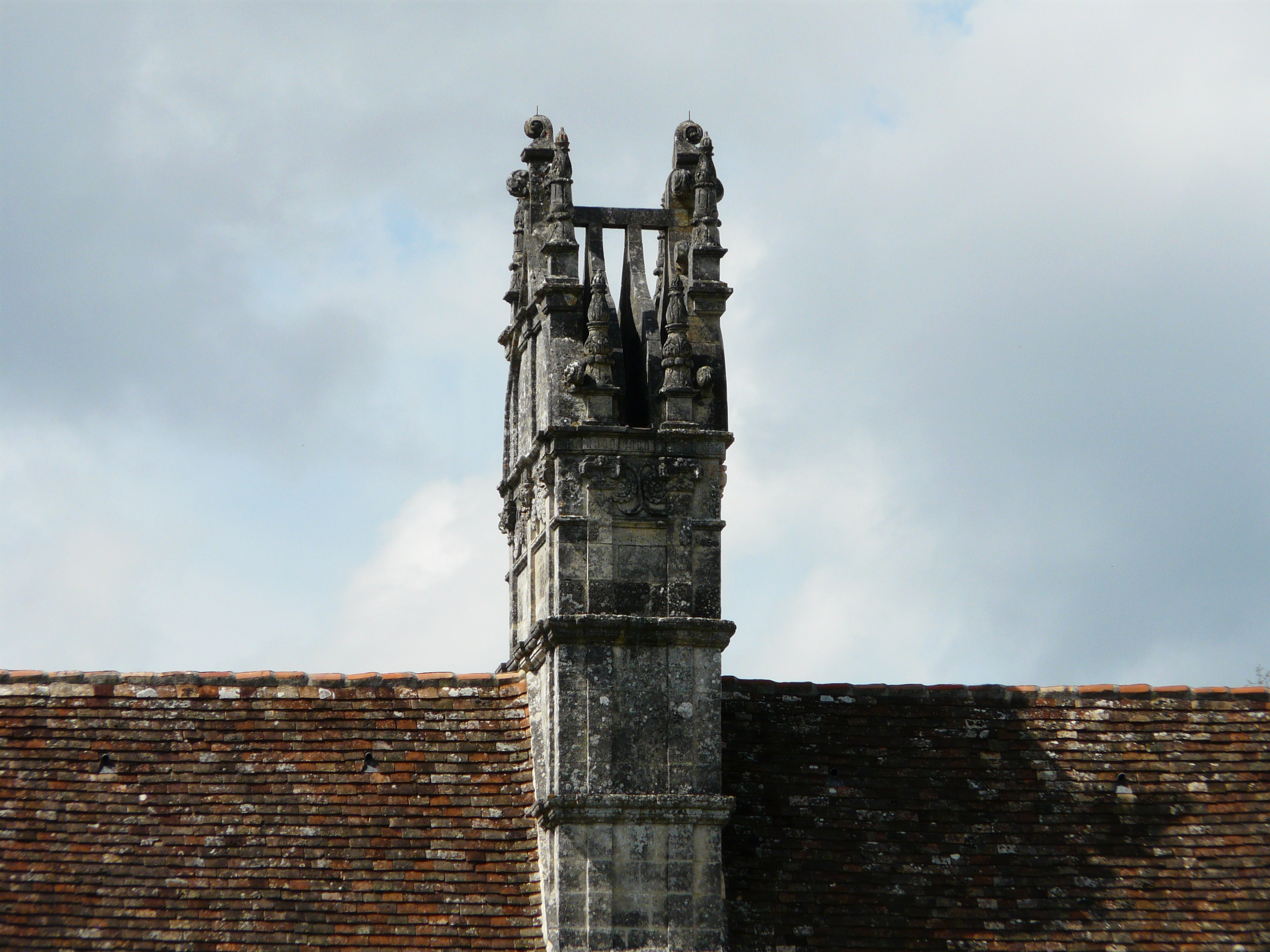
A chimney

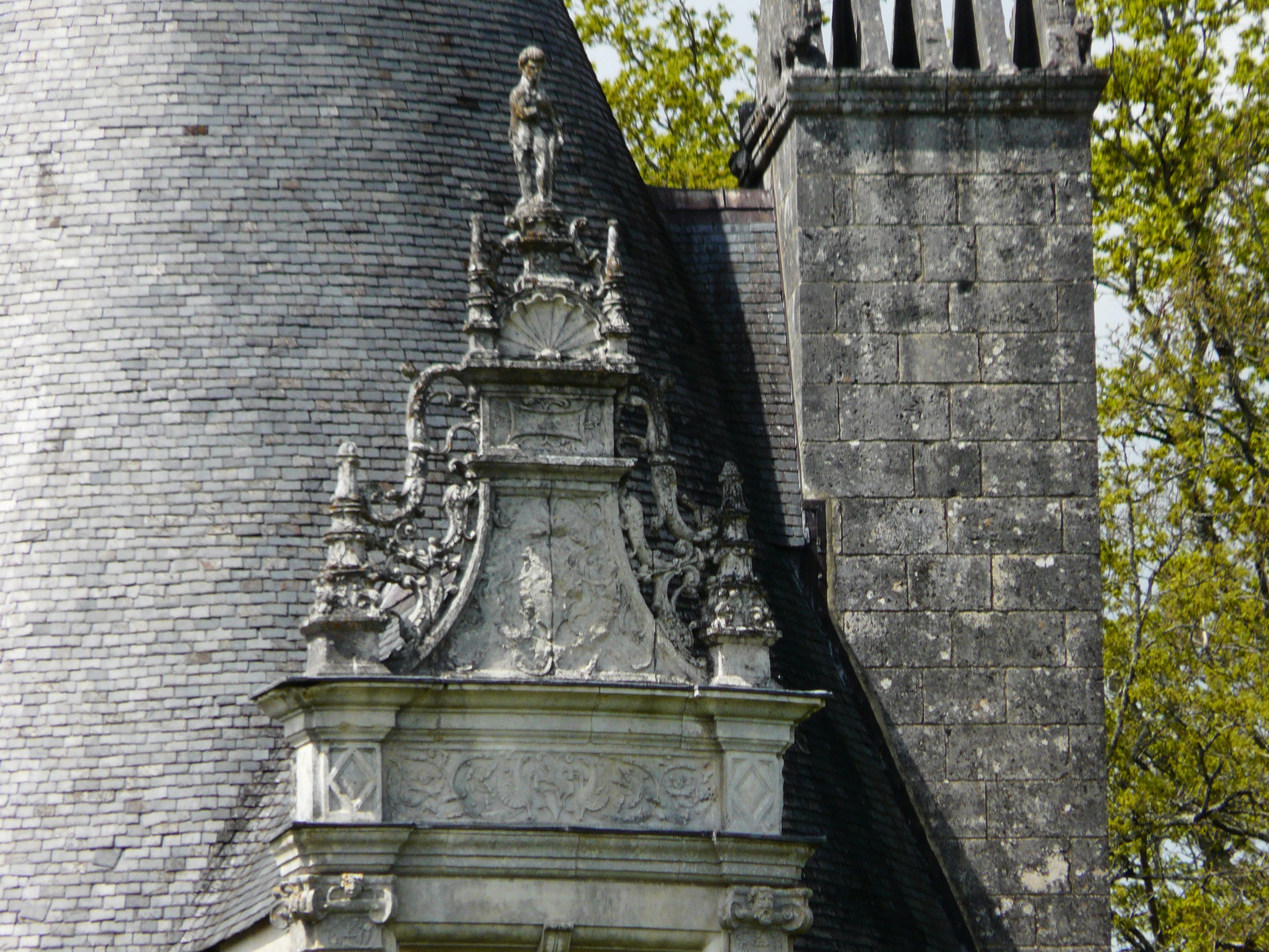
A decorated skylight

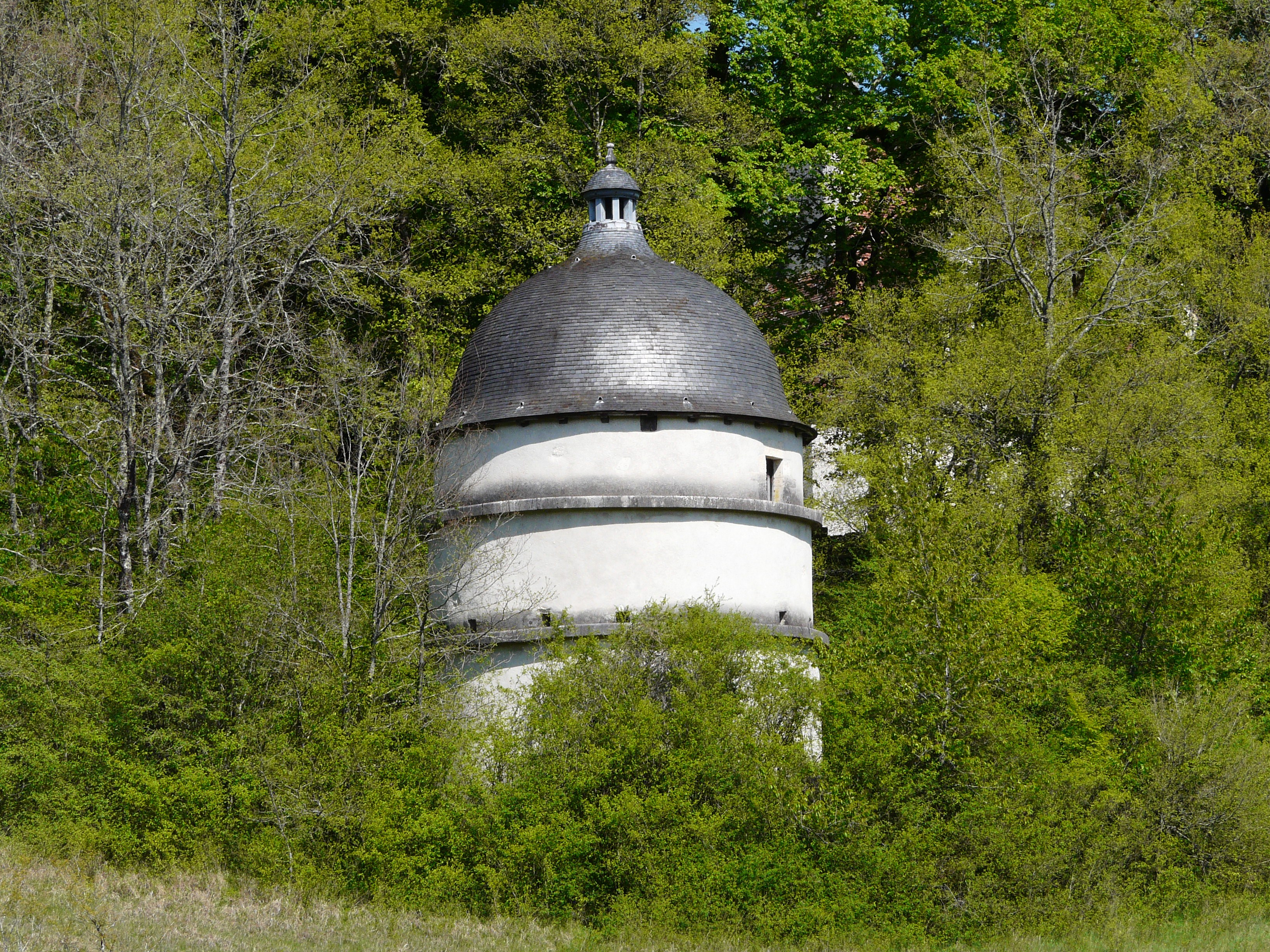
The dovecote
