= Nancy Spanier =

American choreographer and educator (born 1942)

- Born: Nancy Louise Spanier; December 29, 1942 (age 83); New York, New York, U.S.
- Occupation: Choreographer

Nancy Louise Spanier (born December 29, 1942) is an American dancer, choreographer, artistic director, filmmaker and educator. Her body of choreographic works includes pieces commissioned internationally by museums, universities, dance companies and foundations. She is the founder of the Nancy Spanier Dance Theatre of Colorado, a repertory company known for its highly theatrical and imagistic performances that explore themes through the integration of sculpture, props, and film. Spanning her career, she has incorporated a variety of performance genres and has collaborated, among others, with award-winning playwright Jean-Claude van Itallie, and Anaïs Nin, who documented Spanier's performance in her last diary. Spanier is a professor emerita at the University of Colorado, Boulder where she taught dance from 1969 to 2003.

== Education and early career ==
Born and raised in New York City, Spanier began dancing at the age of four with Blanche Evan. At the age of 11, her choreography was presented at Carnegie Hall. She trained at the American School of Ballet, the Metropolitan Opera Ballet School, The Juilliard School, the Martha Graham School, the American Dance Festival at Connecticut College and studied with Louis Horst, José Limón, Anna Sokolow, Charles Weidman and Joseph Pilates. She attended Professional Children's School and received her B.A. degree in Dramatic Literature from Middlebury College in 1964 and her M.A. degree in Dance from Mills College in 1969. At an early age she performed with José Limón's company in Doris Humphrey’s Day on Earth, with Pearl Lang Dance Theater, and with Tamiris-Nagrin Dance Company. In 1968 she performed in Duke Ellington’s Second Sacred Concert at Grace Cathedral in San Francisco with the Xoregos Dance Company.

== Professional career ==
In 1974 she formed the Nancy Spanier Dance Theatre of Colorado. Spanier also worked internationally as a freelance choreographer and director with theatre and dance companies in the United States and Europe. In the mid-80s Spanier disbanded the Nancy Spanier Dance Theatre of Colorado and changed its name to Performance Inventions to reflect a broadening context for her work.

She has collaborated with playwright Jean-Claude van Itallie, who performed in her Flesh Chronicles physical theatre piece. She was the choreographer of van Itallie's play The Traveller which had its premiere at The Mark Taper Forum in Los Angeles.

Spanier was a professor in the Department of Theatre and Dance at the University of Colorado Boulder for 34 years. During this period she founded her own school, The Dancecentre and directed the Movement Program at the Denver Center for the Performing Arts' National Theatre Conservatory. She guest taught at Naropa University, Stockholm's Statens Dansskola, Sweden's Lansteatern, Denmark's Aarhus Teater Skole, Copenhagen's Dansens Hus, Bali's Indonesian Institute of the Arts, and New York University Tisch School of the Arts.

She was granted a Choreography Fellowship from the National Endowment for the Arts as well the first Creative Fellowship in Choreography from the Colorado Council on the Arts. In 2020, she was the recipient of the Emily Harvey Foundation Artist Residency in Venice, Italy.

== Selected works ==
In Splendid Unison, 2017
Post Op, 2014
Contemplations at 70, 2012
Of Memory, 2011
Le Jardinier de la Gafferie, 2010
Flesh Sites, 2007
Envolée, 2004
Echos, Esprits et Traces dans l’ancien Hospice de Hautefort, 2002
Flesh Chronicles, 1988
Fatal Attraction, 1985
Tribes, 1985
Migration: Heat of Angels, 1984
Spheres of Influence, 1984
Eternal Rendezvous: A Trilogy, 1983
Maiden Forms, 1982
Pageant in Passage, 1981
Triptych, 1981
High Country: A Celebration, 1980
Side by Side and Inside, 1979
Arena: A Documentary in Five Rounds, 1978
Canti d’Innocenza, 1977
Show on Earth, 1976
Abundance, 1976
Peak to Peak, 1975
A Peep Show: For Women Only, 1974
Time Wounds All Heals, 1973
Glass Camellias, 1972
Mauvais Jeu, 1971
Parched Plain, 1969

== Books ==
Larisa Oancea, Nancy Spanier: The Arc of a Dancing Life, Performance Inventions, 2021.
