= Hôtel de Ville, Saintes =

Town hall in Saintes, France

Hôtel de Ville
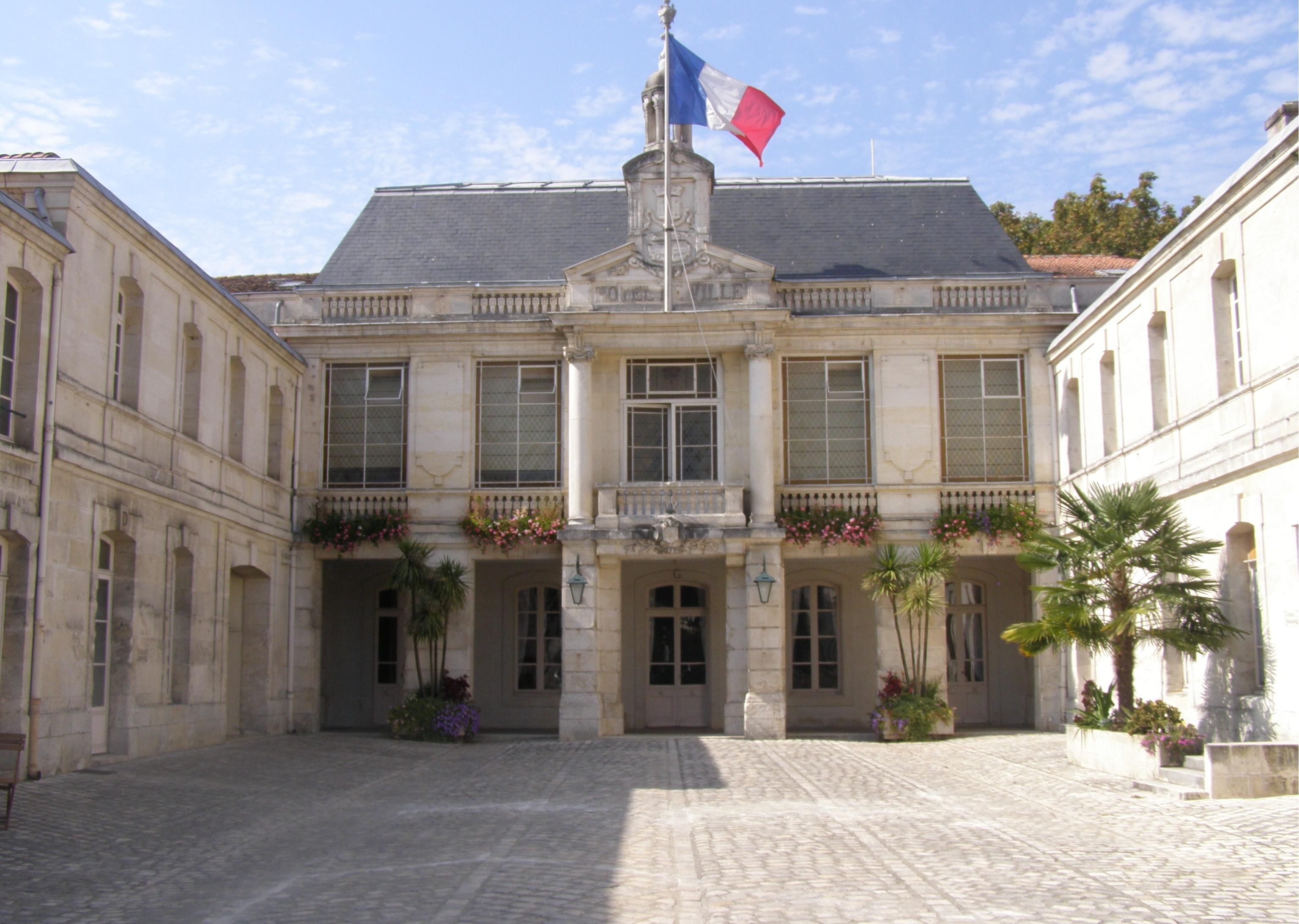
- The main frontage of the Hôtel de Ville in September 2007
- Interactive map of the Hôtel de Ville area

General information
- Type: City hall
- Architectural style: Neoclassical style
- Location: Saintes, France
- Coordinates: 45.7441°N 0.6333°W
- Completed: 1874

Design and construction
- Architect: Charles Brouty

The Hôtel de Ville (French pronunciation: [otɛl də vil], City Hall) is a municipal building in Saintes, Charente-Maritime, in western France, standing on Square André-Maudet.

== History ==
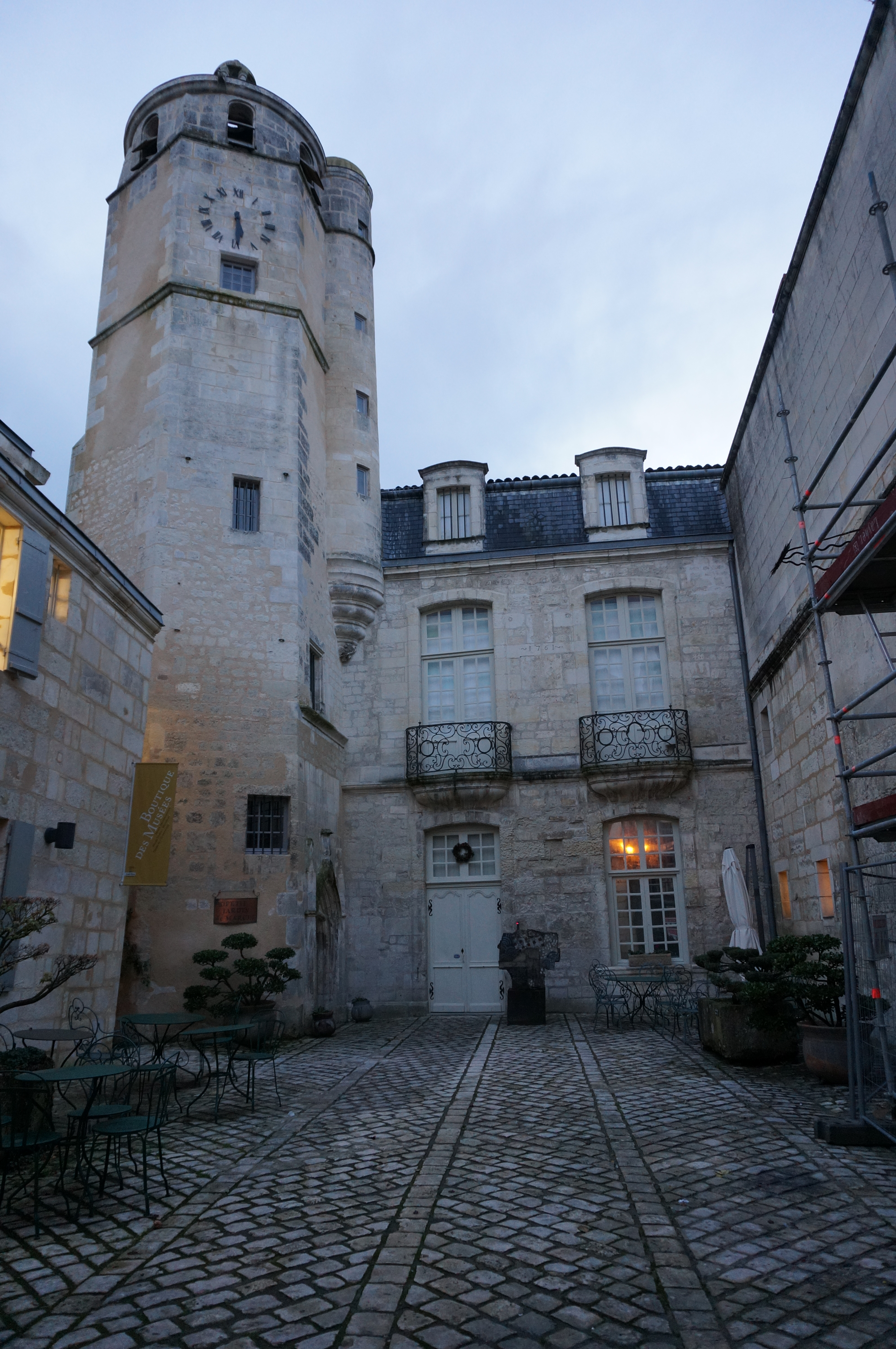
The Aldermen's House

The first meeting place of the aldermen of the town was the Maison de l'Échevinage (Aldermen's House) on the west side Rue Alsace-Lorraine dating from the 16th century. The building was built round a courtyard and incorporated a medieval clock tower with a lantern which was installed in 1587. After the building was no longer required for municipal purposes, it was converted for use as the Musée de l'Échevinage (Museum of the Aldermen). It accumulated a collection of porcelain from Sèvres and paintings from the 19th and 20th centuries.

In 1832, after the Maison de l'Échevinage became dilapidated, the town council decided to move their offices some 300 metres (980 ft) south, to the former deanery of the Cathedral of Saint-Pierre. The deanery was on the west side of what is now Rue Georges Clemenceau, facing the cathedral. However, the building, its library and the municipal archives were devastated by a fire which broke out in 1871.

The town council decided to commission a new building on the same site. The new building was a typical hôtel particulier with a grand gate, a grand courtyard and two ornate façades. It was designed by Charles Brouty in the neoclassical style, built in ashlar stone and was completed in 1874.

The design involved a symmetrical main frontage of five bays, at the back of the courtyard, flanked by two wings which were projected forward. There was a loggia on the ground floor and five large casement windows with balustrades on the first floor. The central bay featured a full-height portico formed by a pair of banded columns on the ground floor, and a pair of Ionic order columns on the first floor, supporting a pediment which was surmounted by a coat of arms and topped by a small lantern with a stone dome.

When German troops occupied the town in June 1944, during the Second World War, the town hall, along with the sub-prefecture and the post office were the first buildings to be taken over by the German authorities. This situation continued until the town was liberated by the RAC Brigade, part of the French Resistance, in September 1944.
