= Pinnacle =

Architectural element

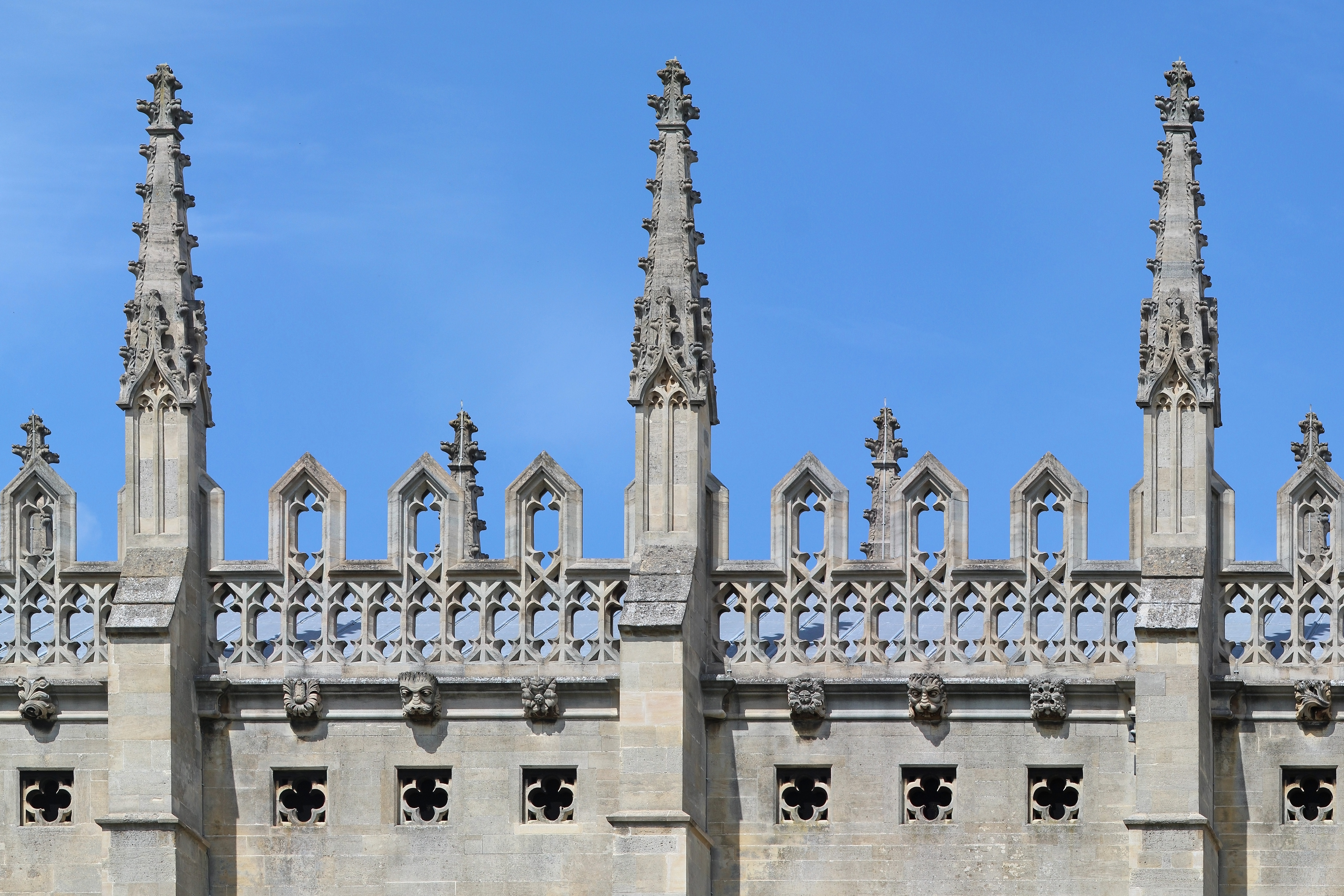
Pinnacles, studded with crockets, on King's College Chapel, Cambridge.

A pinnacle is an architectural element originally forming the cap or crown of a buttress or small turret, but afterwards used on parapets at the corners of towers and in many other situations. The pinnacle looks like a small spire. It was mainly used in Gothic architecture.

The pinnacle had two purposes:

1. Ornamental – adding to the loftiness and verticity of the structure. They sometimes ended with statues, such as in Milan Cathedral.
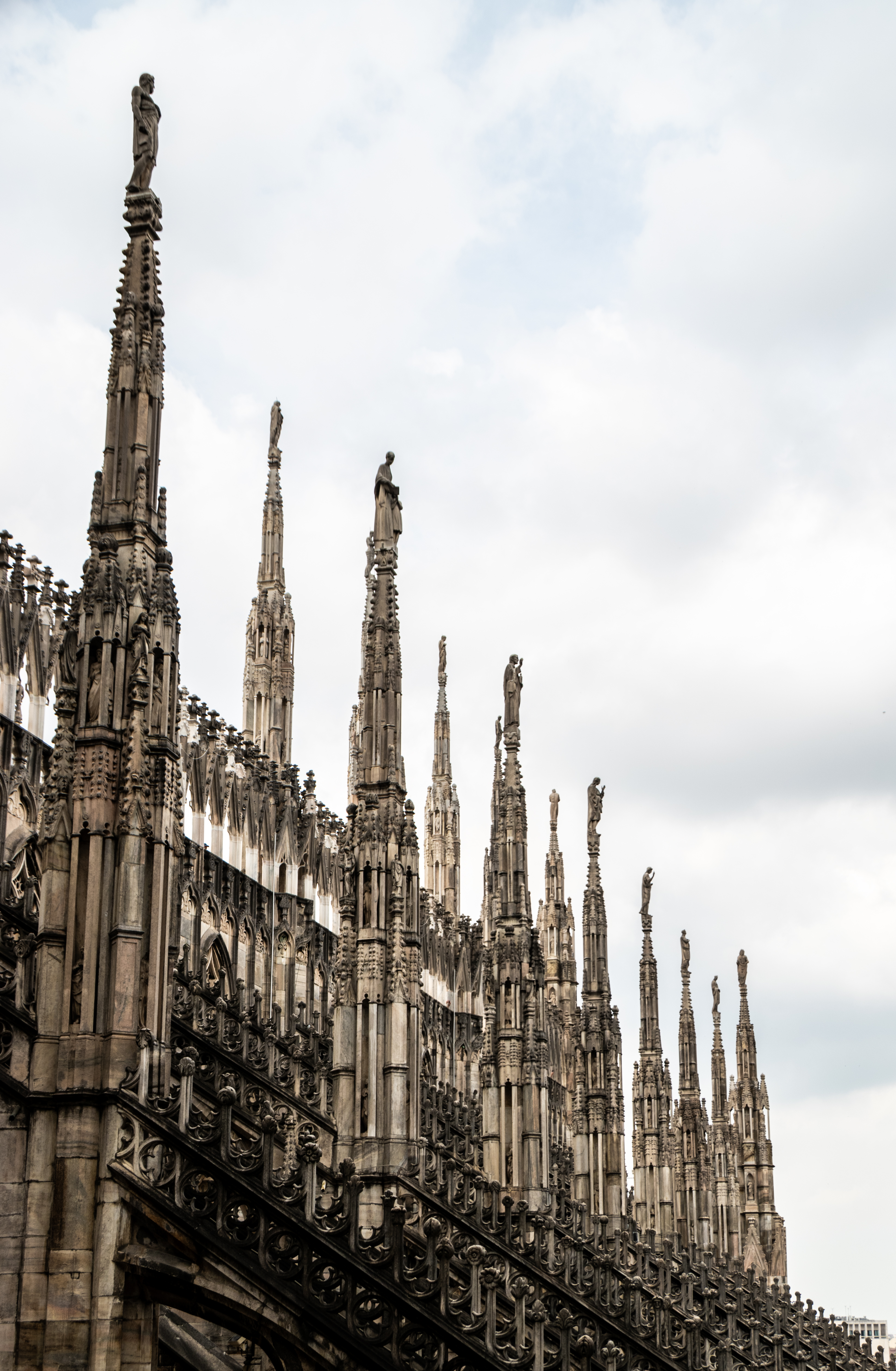
  Ornamental pinnacles of Milan Cathedral
2. Structural – the pinnacles were very heavy and often rectified with lead, in order to enable the flying buttresses to contain the stress of the structure vaults and roof. This was done by adding compressive stress (a result of the pinnacle weight) to the thrust vector and thus shifting it downwards rather than sideways.

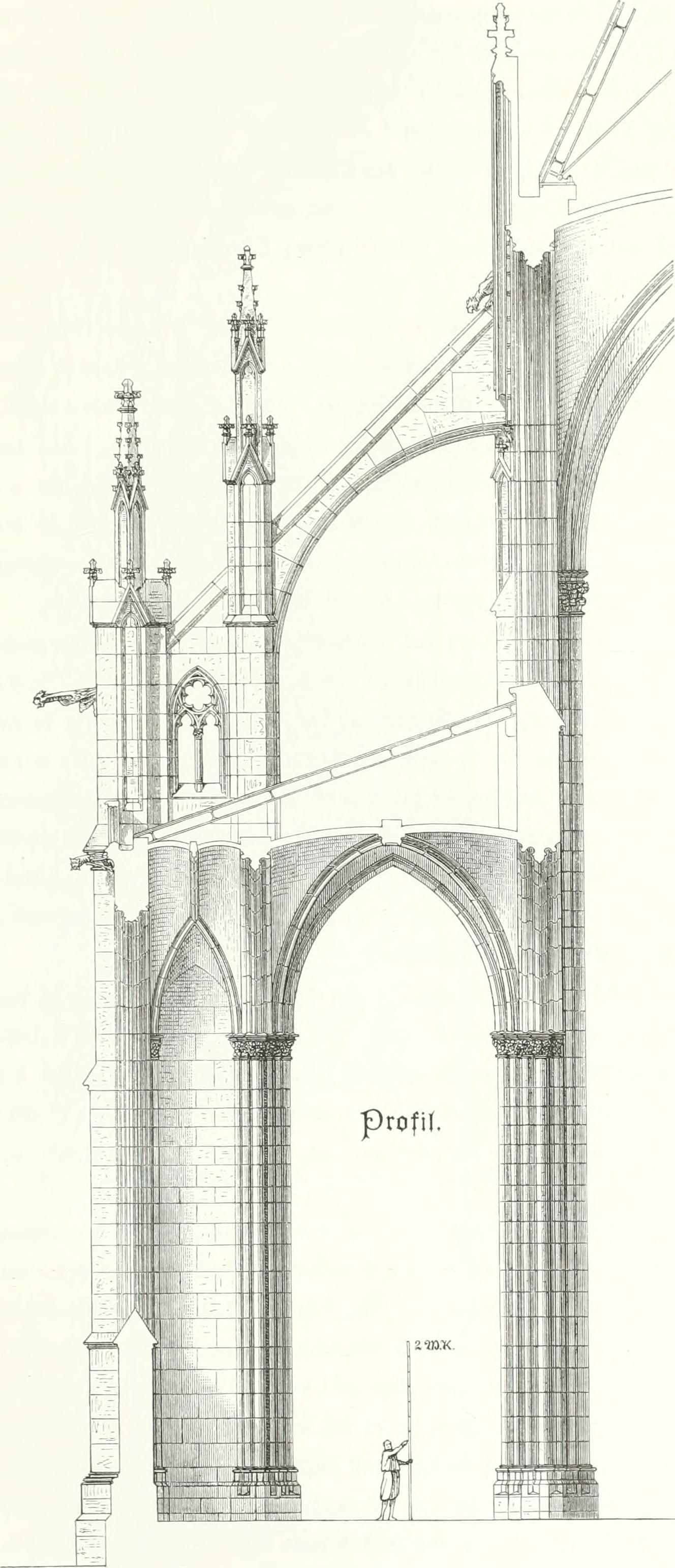
Architectural drawing of a Neo-Gothic flying buttress with pinnacles for the late 19th-century Votive Church in Vienna.

== History ==
The accounts of Jesus' temptations in Matthew's and Luke's gospels both suggest that the Second Temple in Jerusalem had one or more pinnacles (Greek: το πτερυγιον του ιερου):

Then he (Satan) brought Him to Jerusalem, set Him on the pinnacle of the temple, and said to Him, "If You are the Son of God, throw Yourself down from here.

Some have stated that there were no pinnacles in the Romanesque style, but conical caps to circular buttresses, with finial terminations, are not uncommon in France at very early periods. Eugène Viollet-le-Duc gives examples from Saint-Germer-de-Fly Abbey and the Basilica of Saint-Remi, and there is one of similar form at the west front of Rochester Cathedral.

Pinnacles on the top of walls and the corner of flying buttresses

The early-Gothic Notre-Dame de Paris. Arrows show forces (black: forces of cathedral on the ground, green: forces of ground on cathedral). The weight of pinnacles helps keep the line of thrust inside the buttress.

In the 12th-century Romanesque, two examples have been cited, one from Bredon in Worcestershire, and the other from Cleeve in Gloucestershire. In these the buttresses run up, forming a sort of square turret, and crowned with a pyramidal cap, very much like those of the next period, the Early English.

In this and the following styles, mainly in Gothic architecture, the pinnacle seems generally to have had its appropriate uses. It was a weight to counteract the thrust of the vaults, particularly where there were flying buttresses; it stopped the tendency of the stone copings slipping on the gables, and counterpoised the thrust of spires; it formed a pier to steady the elegant perforated parapets of later periods; and in France especially served to counterbalance the weight of overhanging corbel tables, huge gargoyles, etc.

In the Early English period the small buttresses frequently finished with gablets, and the more important with pinnacles supported with clustered shafts. At this period the pinnacles were often supported on these shafts alone, and were open below; and in larger work in this and subsequent periods they frequently form niches and contain statues. About the Transition and during the Decorated Gothic period, the different faces above the angle shafts often finish with gablets. Those of the last-named period are much richer, and are generally decorated with crockets and finials, and sometimes with ball flowers. Very fine groups are found at Beverley Minster and at the rise of the spire of St Mary's, Oxford. Perpendicular pinnacles differ little from Decorated, except that the crockets and finials are of later character. They are also often set angle-ways, particularly on parapets, and the shafts are panelled.

In France pinnacles, like spires, seem to have been in use earlier than in England. There are small pinnacles at the angles of the tower in the Saintes Cathedral. At Roullet-Saint-Estèphe there are pinnacles in a similar position, each composed of four small shafts, with caps and bases surmounted with small pyramidal spires. In all these examples the towers have semicircular-headed windows.

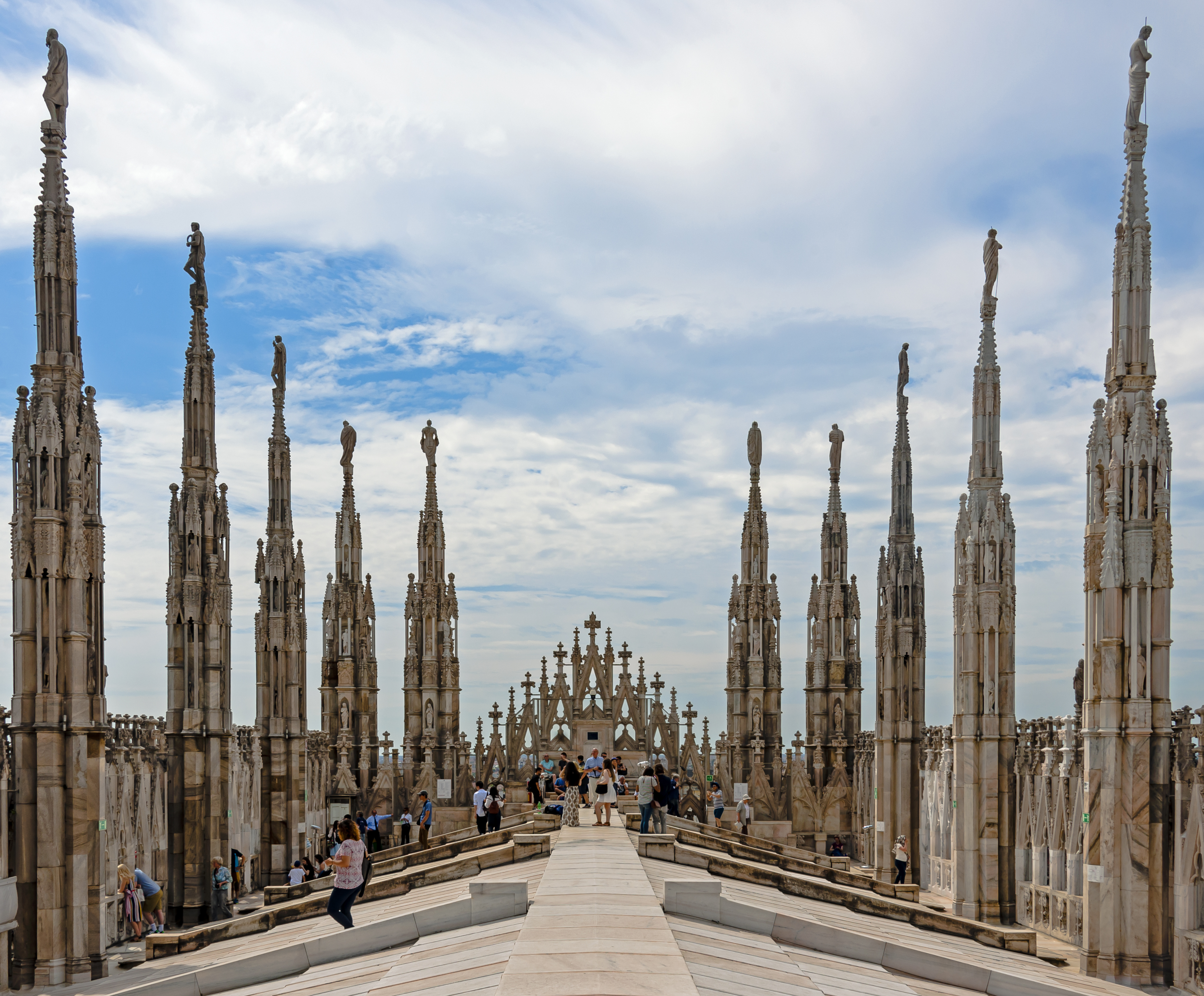
Pinnacles with statues on the roof of Milan Cathedral

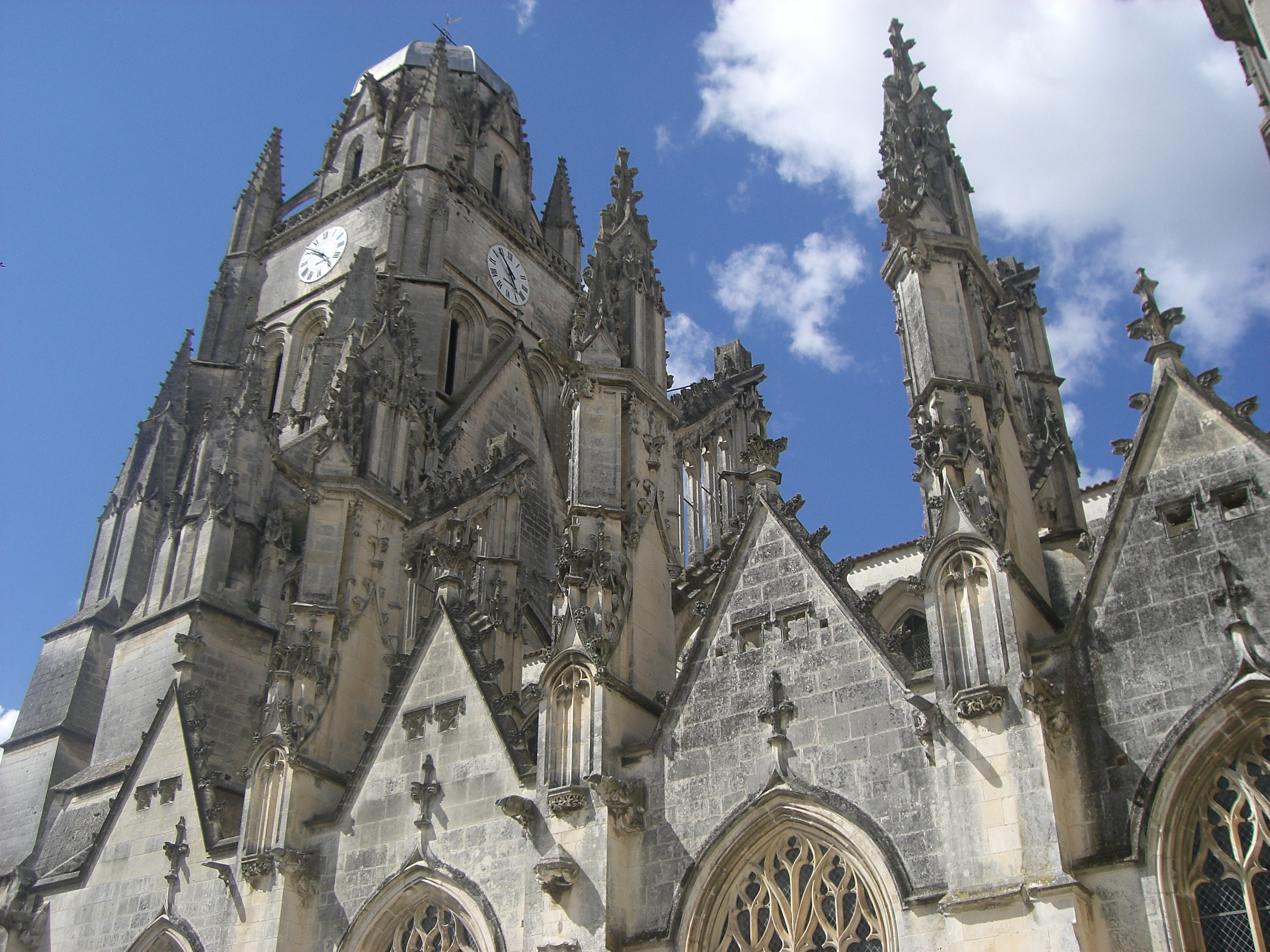
Pinnacles at Saintes Cathedral

== See also ==
- Gothic cathedrals and churches
- Gothic architecture
- High Gothic
- Rayonnant
- Cathedral architecture
- Pinnacle (geology)
