= Canton of Saintes =

Coordinates: 45.75°N 0.63°W

The canton of Saintes is an administrative division of the Charente-Maritime department, western France. It was created at the French canton reorganisation which came into effect in March 2015. Its seat is in Saintes.

It consists of the following communes:

1. Saintes
