= Saintes, Charente-Maritime =

Subprefecture and commune in Nouvelle-Aquitaine, France

Saintes Sénte (Poitevin–Saintongeais)
- Subprefecture and commune
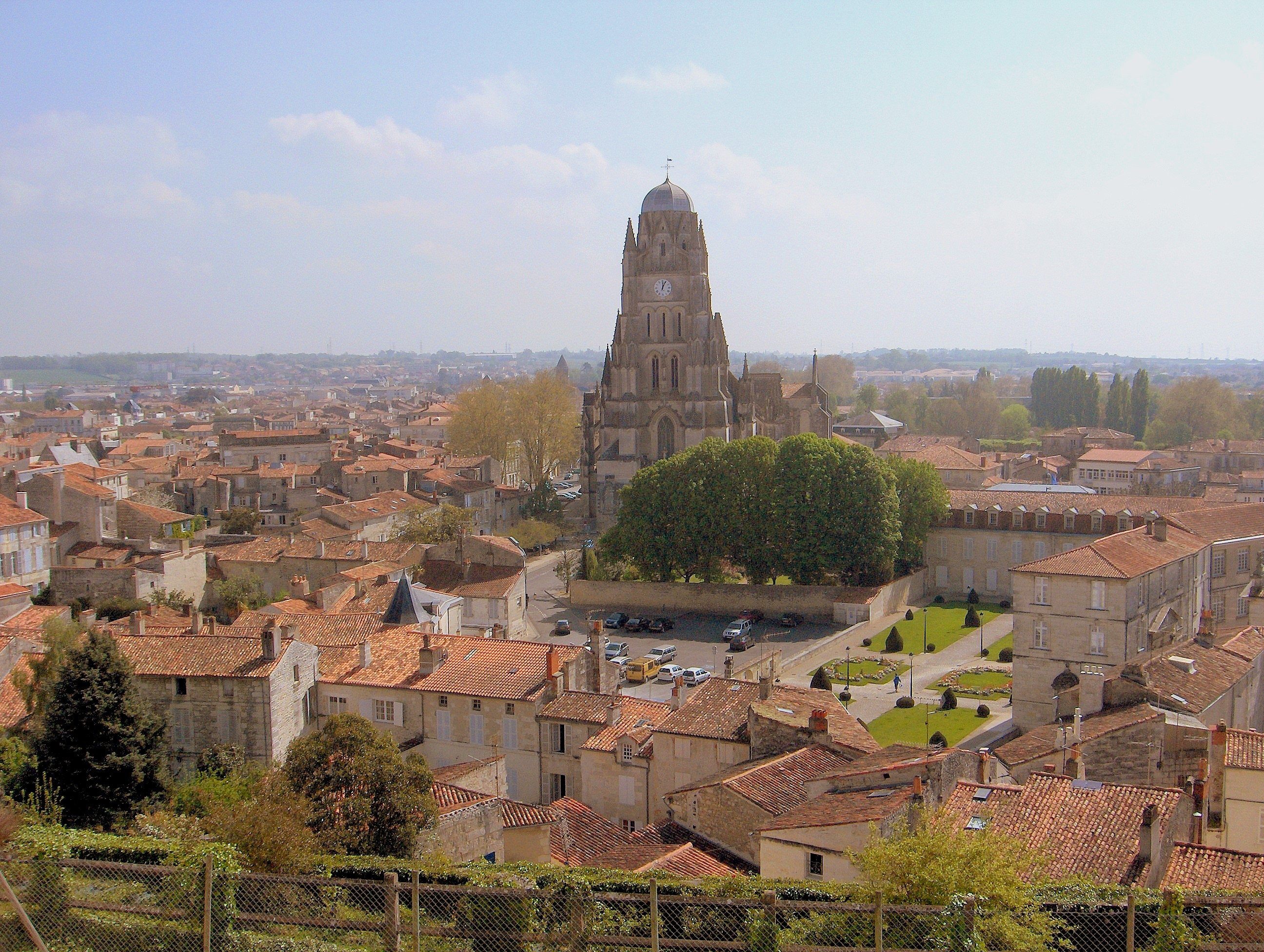
- Panorama of Saintes with Saint-Pierre Cathedral in the center

- Coat of arms
- Location of Saintes
- Location within France Location within Nouvelle-Aquitaine
- Coordinates: 45°44′47″N 0°38′00″W
- Country: France
- Region: Nouvelle-Aquitaine
- Department: Charente-Maritime
- Arrondissement: Saintes
- Canton: Saintes
- Intercommunality: CA Saintes

Government
  - Mayor (2020–2026): Bruno Drapron
- Area^{1}: 45.55 km^{2} (17.59 sq mi)
- Elevation: 47 m (154 ft)
- Highest elevation: 81 m (266 ft)
- Lowest elevation: 2 m (6.6 ft)
- Population (2023): 25,363
  - Density: 556.8/km^{2} (1,442/sq mi)
- Time zone: UTC+01:00 (CET)
  - Summer (DST): UTC+02:00 (CEST)
- INSEE/Postal code: 17415 /17100
- ^{1} French Land Register data, which excludes lakes, ponds, glaciers > 1 km^{2} (0.386 sq mi or 247 acres) and river estuaries.

Saintes (French: [sɛ̃t]; Poitevin-Saintongeais: Sénte) is a commune and historic town in western France, in the Charente-Maritime department of which it is a sub-prefecture in Nouvelle-Aquitaine. Saintes is the second-largest city in Charente-Maritime, with 25,518 inhabitants in 2021. The city's immediate surroundings form the second-most populous metropolitan area in the department, with 56,598 inhabitants. While a majority of the surrounding landscape consists of fertile, productive fields, a significant minority of the region remains forested, its natural state.

In Roman times, Saintes was known as Mediolanum Santonum. During much of its history, the name of the city was spelled Xaintes or Xainctes.

Primarily built on the left bank of the Charente, Saintes became the first Roman capital of Aquitaine. Later it was designated as the capital of the province of Saintonge under the Ancien Régime. Following the French Revolution, it briefly became the prefecture of the department (then called Charente-Inférieure) during the territorial reorganization of 1790, until La Rochelle was designated and superseded it in 1810. Although it had the status only of a subprefecture, (Note: The prefecture of Charente-Maritime is La Rochelle and the subprefectures are alphabetically: Jonzac, Rochefort, Saint-Jean-d'Angély and Saintes.) Saintes was allowed to remain the judicial centre of the department. In the late 19th century, Saintes was chosen as the seat of the VIIIth arrondissement of the Chemins de Fer de l'État, railways, which enabled an era of economic and demographic growth.

Today, Saintes remains the economic heart of the centre of the department, and it is an important transport hub. A few major industrial businesses operate (in electronics, rail repair, construction of hoists). The city's commerce and service sector is large, featuring the headquarters of Co-op Atlantique, and administrative functions of state, courts, and legal services; banks, schools, and a hospital. Beyond this, property maintenance, retail, and tourism sectors provide large numbers of jobs.

Because of its noteworthy Gallo-Roman, medieval and classical heritage, Saintes is a tourist destination. It has been a member of the French Towns and Lands of Art and History since 1990. It has several museums, a theater, cinemas, and organizes numerous festivals. A European centre of musical research and practice is based in its Abbaye aux Dames.

== Geography ==
=== Location ===
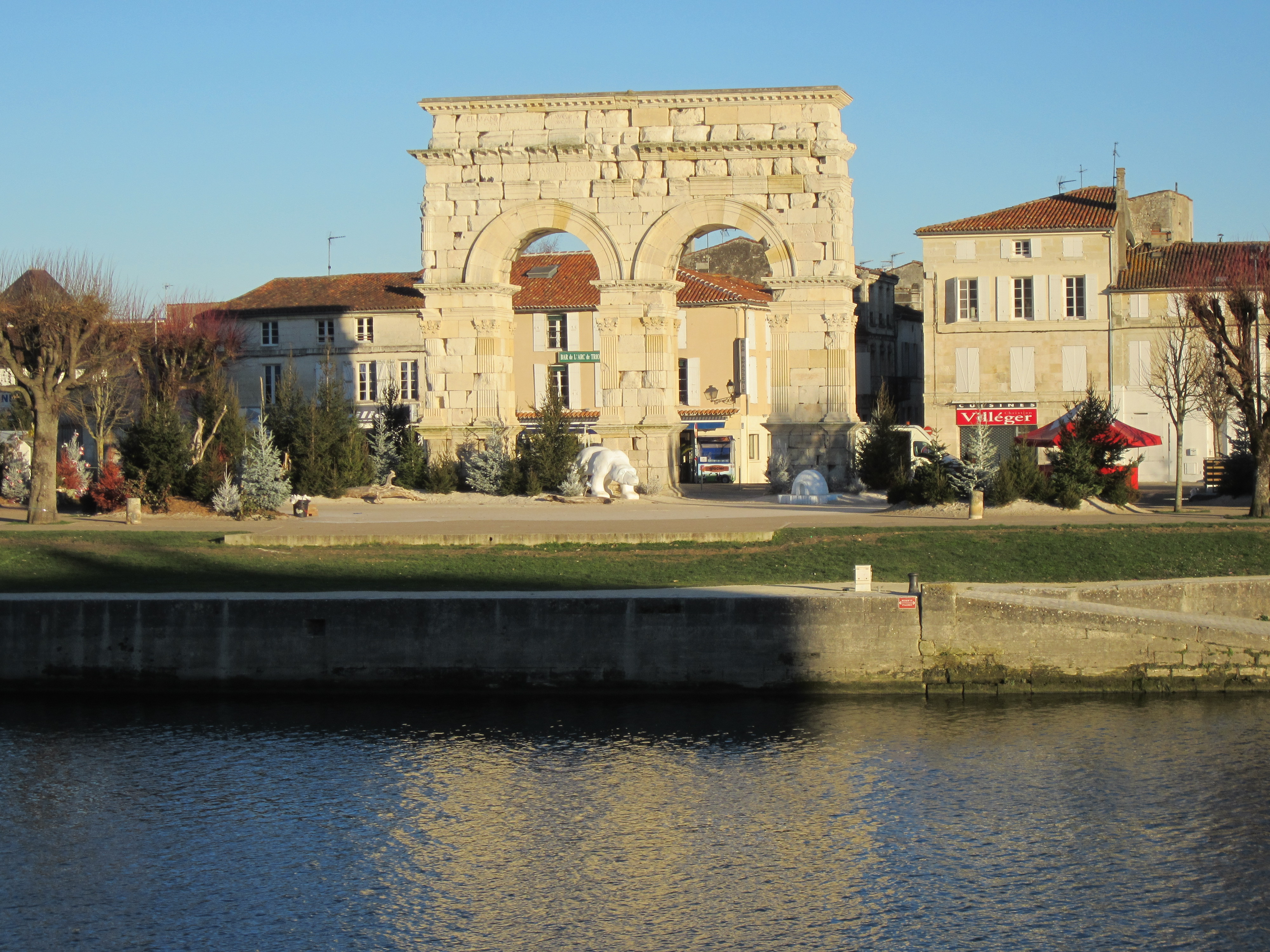
Arch of Germanicus and the Charente

Saintes is on the banks of the river Charente, in the center-eastern part of the department. The city is 60 km southeast of La Rochelle, 33 kilometers northeast of Royan, and about 100 km north of Bordeaux (to which it is linked by the A10 autoroute).

=== Geology ===
A chronostratigraphic stage of sedimentary rock (in stratigraphy) has been named after the former name for inhabitants, the Santones, the Santonian (approximately 84 Ma ago, after the Coniacian Age and before the Campanian Age in the Cretaceous Period). Saintes is built on its eponymous subset of mainly limestone that consists of particular flint nodules of quartz geodes and nodules of iron. Ancient stone quarries in its 'Colline de la Capitole' (Capitol Hill) and Bellevue, partially filled or converted to permit fungiculture, are evidence for Santonian stone's use in the construction of various buildings, where unimproved quite vulnerable to frost.

Nearer to the river, the Cretaceous plateau gives way to more or less recent alluvial grasslands composed of bri, a type of clay.

The uplifting of the Alps and Pyrenees began during the Maastrichtian, 65 Ma ago, and continued for a part of the Paleogene.

=== Districts ===
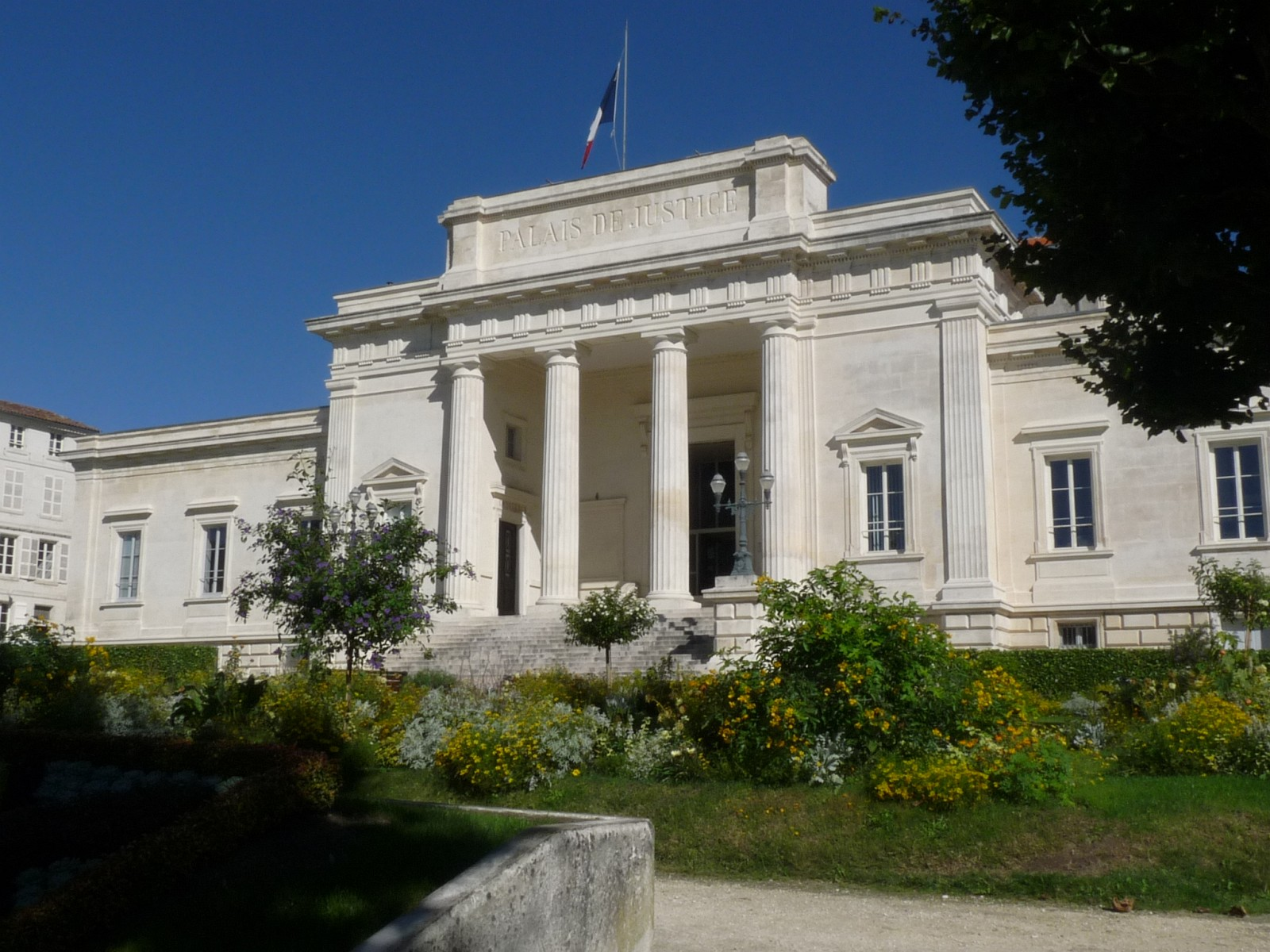
Courthouse, district Saint-Vivien

The town is divided into 14 administrative areas: Les Boiffiers, Les Tourneurs, L'Ormeau de Pied, Recouvrance, La Fenêtre, Saint-Rémy, Saint-Vivien, Saint-Eutrope, Saint-Pierre, Saint-Pallais, Saint-Sébastien de Bouard, La Récluse, Le Maine-Saint-Sorlin and Bellevue.

==== Left bank (Rive gauche) ====
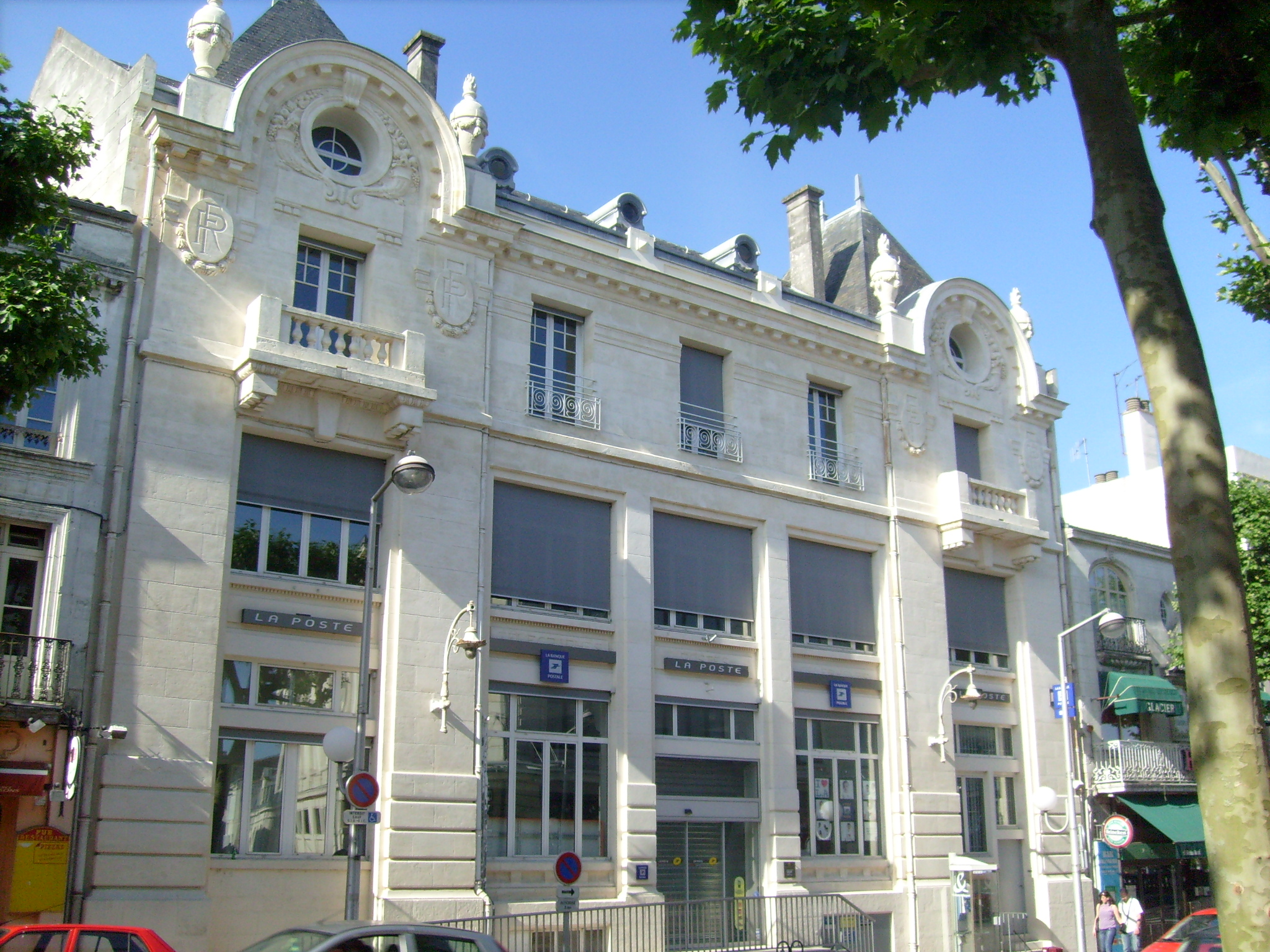
The Post Office on the left bank

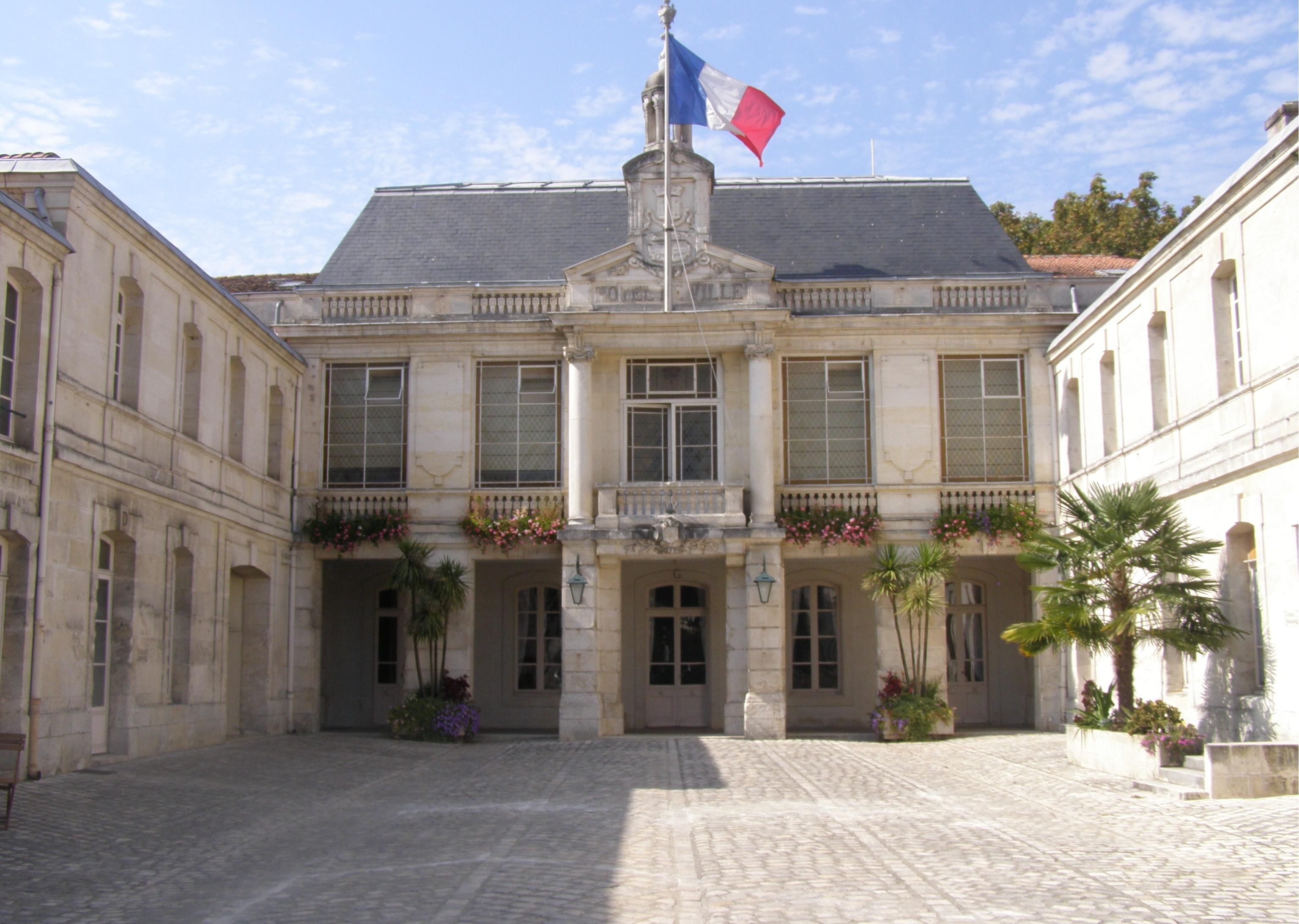
The Hôtel de Ville on the left bank, district Saint-Pierre

The neighbourhood of Saint-Pierre lies between the hill of the Capitole and the river Charente. It possesses a significant number of historic monuments forming the core of a conservation area that spans over 65 hectares (0.25 mi^{2}). Built around the cathedral Saint-Pierre, the place du marché and the place du Synode, it is crossed by pedestrian alleys around which can be found numerous medieval, renaissance and classic buildings.

Almost immediately west lies the neighbourhood of Saint-Eutrope, developed over the centuries around a rocky elevation bounded by two small valleys at right angles to the river. Dominated by the Saint-Eutrope basilica, it also contains the remains of a Clunian priory and several hillside houses. Little valleys lead to the vallon des Arènes (meaning arenas vale) below, where a Roman amphitheatre survives, in a park named "Parc des Arènes".

The cours Reverseaux and cours des Apôtres de la liberté separate Saint-Eutrope (and its hill) in the west from the faubourg Berthonnière. These partly separate the hill of the Capitole to the north. Once outside the walls, the faubourg included some hostelries and inns for pilgrims. The streets of the faubourg converge toward the place Saint-Louis, the place de l'Aubarrée and the place Blair, dominated by a column of Liberty (in France popularised as fictional Marianne at the time) erected during the Revolution. The square Goulebenéze stands between the place Blair and the river.

The neighbourhoods of les Boiffiers and Bellevue are separated from the rest of the city by the avenue de Saintonge; they consist mainly of low-rent housing (HLM) and suburban housing, standing on a plateau bounded by the Charente. Bellevue has 1,560 inhabitants and spans 17 hectares (42 acres); it is listed as a zone urbaine sensible (ZUS).

La Recouvrance, in a triangle formed by the cours du maréchal Leclerc, the cours Genet and the rocade ouest (bypass), contains a lycée, the former seminary, the Yvon Chevalier stadium and a shopping mall. The water tower of Recouvrance is decorated with frescoes by contemporary artist Michel Genty.

In the north of the urban area, the Saint-Vivien neighbourhood has an old faubourg (exurb) which has been inhabited since antiquity. Here, the thermes de Saint-Saloine, ancient Roman baths, are found.

==== Right bank (Rive droite) ====
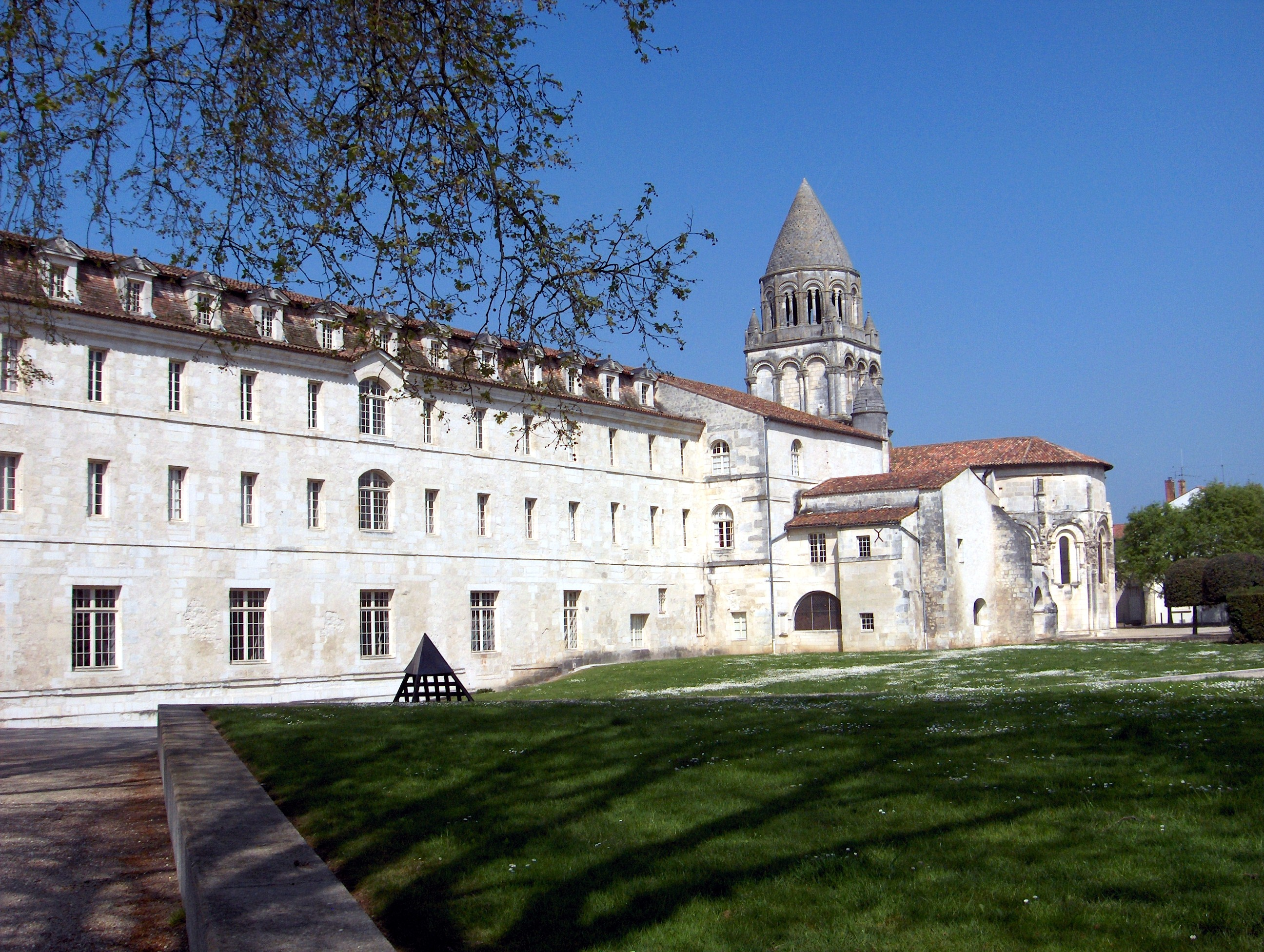
Abbaye aux Dames on the right bank

The neighbourhood of Saint-Pallais was probably urbanised in antiquity. Structured around the main access way of the Roman city, it was then linked to the town centre by a bridge with a monumental entrance, the Arch of Germanicus. During the Middle Ages, a funeral basilica, dedicated to the bishop Palladius, was established (and later replaced by the église Saint-Pallais, which gives its name to the neighbourhood), a Benedictine abbey of women, amongst the largest in the region, the Abbaye aux Dames de Saintes. The presence of this monumental heritage led to the integration of part of the neighbourhood into a conservation area. It was during the 19th century that the neighbourhood began to develop. The old bridge was replaced in 1879 by the pont Bernard-Palissy, a few metres upstream; the avenue Gambetta and the place Bassompierre were created; the railway station, the Gare de Saintes, the prison, the Haras national de Saintes, the parc Pierre-Mendès France, the Jardin public Fernand Chapsal and the protected area of the prairie de la Palu were subsequently created.

=== Adjacent communes ===
Saintes and its neighboring communes (in orange : Communauté de communes du Pays santon).

=== Roads ===
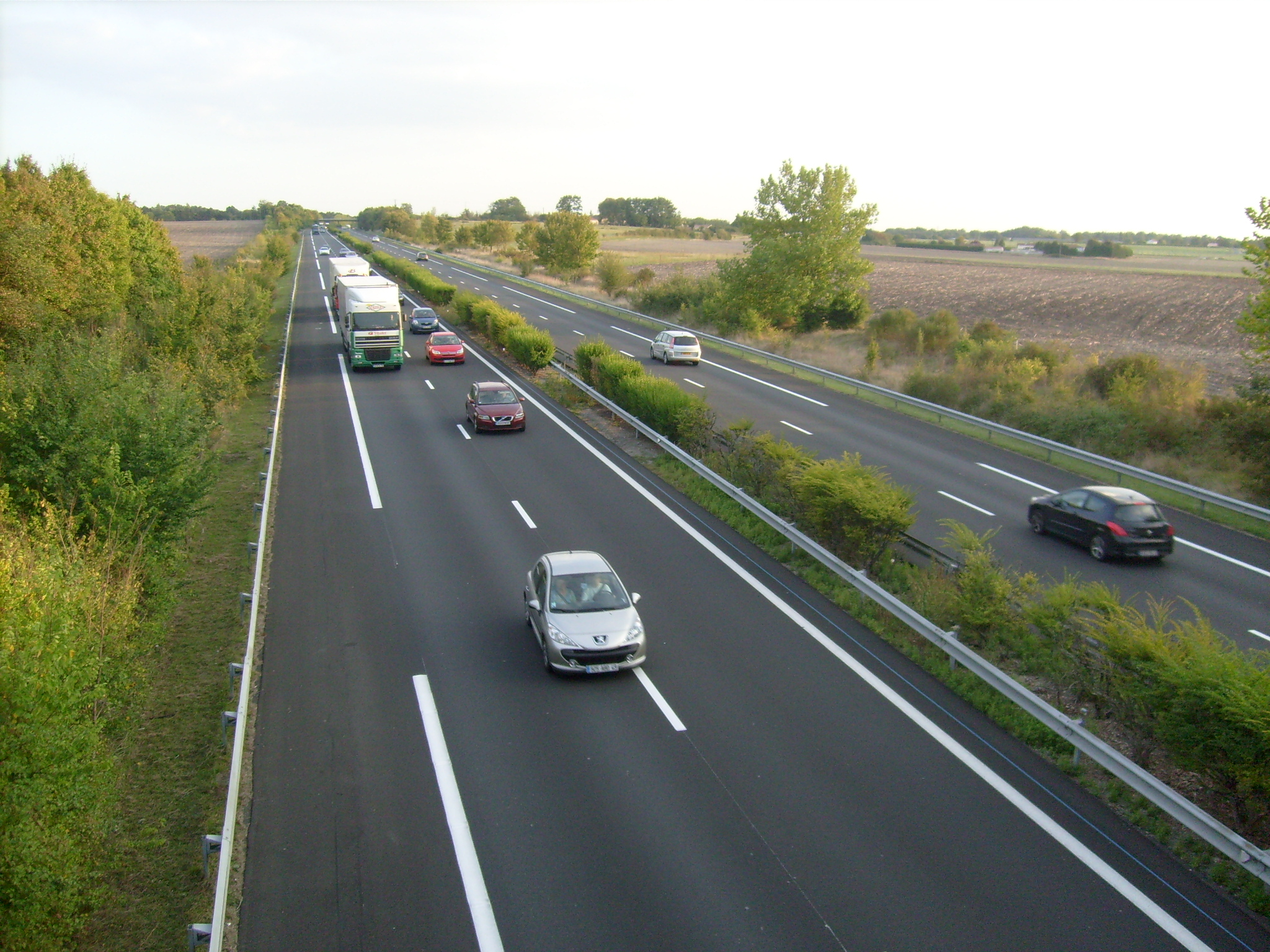
The autoroute A10 leaving Saintes towards Bordeaux

Saintes is a transportation hub of some importance, connected by two motorways and several secondary roads, national and departmental, that converge towards the rocade (partly a 2x2) that bypasses the city on its western and southern sides.

The A10 autoroute (France), operated locally by Autoroutes du Sud de la France, passes through the commune in its western part, in a north–south axis. It can be accessed by the interchange 35. By the A10, Saintes is 125 km (78 mi) from Bordeaux, 140 km (87 mi) from Poitiers, 470 km (290 mi) from Paris.

The A837 autoroute is a spur road of the A10 linking the area to Rochefort, the third city in the department.

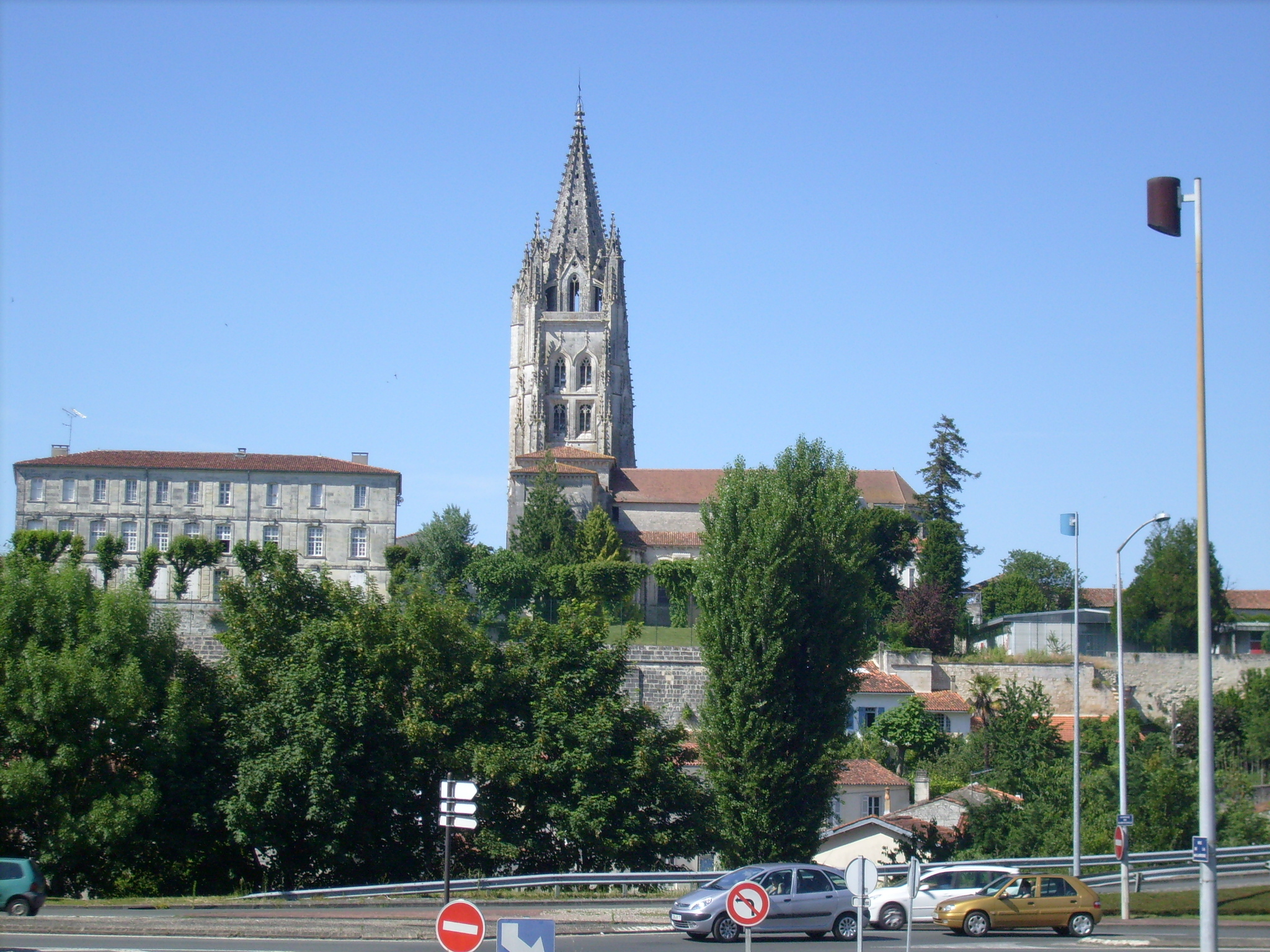
The Saint-Eutrope basilica from the Avenue de Saintonge

Saintes is on the Route Centre-Europe Atlantique, an expressway that links it to Limoges and Lyon in the east – its dualled western section Saintes-Saujon opened to traffic in 2008 making the two 25 minutes apart by car. An extension towards Royan on the coast completed in the following decade.

The rocade is formed in its western part by the national road 137, that meets two key roads, the departmental road 728 (that links Saintes to the Island of Oleron by Marennes) and the departmental road 150 that intersects near the locality of Diconche. In its southern part, the rocade integrates the national road 141, that runs east towards Cognac, Angoulême and Limoges. The departmental road 150, at the end of the east part, runs towards Niort by Saint-Hilaire-de-Villefranche et Saint-Jean-d'Angély. The town centre of Saintes is bypassed by the avenue de Saintonge or departmental road 24, that crosses the Charente using the bridge de Saintonge, opened in 1969.

=== Train ===
The Gare de Saintes (railway station) is at the focal point of five railways that link the agglomeration to Nantes (by La Rochelle), Bordeaux, Angoulême, Niort and Royan; the trains are mainly part of the regional rail network TER Nouvelle-Aquitaine and the network Intercités.

In 1894, the station was the starting point of a 3 km (1.9 mi) long network of tramways that was stopped in 1934. A secondary railway was built, also in 1894, 42 km (26 mi) long linking Saintes to Mortagne-sur-Gironde, by Gémozac, then a somewhat important economic centre; however, this railway was dismantled in 1947.

The importance of this railway network is explained by the designation of Saintes as the seat of the Compagnie des chemins de fer des Charentes in 1867, then as the regional seat of the VIIIth arrondissement of the Chemins de fer de l'État from 1911 to 1971. The SNCF is still a major employer in the city, and new depots and workshops were opened in 2009 and 2010.

== Population ==
Its inhabitants are called Saintaises and Saintais in French.

Historical population

Year	Pop.	±% p.a.
1793	8,388	—
1800	10,050	+2.62%
1806	10,300	+0.41%
1821	10,274	−0.02%
1831	10,437	+0.16%
1836	9,559	−1.74%
1841	9,994	+0.89%
1846	11,363	+2.60%
1851	11,569	+0.36%
1856	11,927	+0.61%
1861	10,962	−1.67%
1866	11,570	+1.09%
1872	12,437	+1.21%
1876	13,725	+2.49%
1881	15,763	+2.81%
1886	17,327	+1.91%
1891	18,461	+1.28%
1896	20,285	+1.90%
1901	18,219	−2.13%

Year	Pop.	±% p.a.
1906	19,025	+0.87%
1911	20,802	+1.80%
1921	19,152	−0.82%
1926	20,469	+1.34%
1931	20,592	+0.12%
1936	21,160	+0.55%
1945	23,441	+1.14%
1954	23,768	+0.15%
1962	25,717	+0.99%
1968	26,507	+0.51%
1975	26,891	+0.21%
1982	25,471	−0.77%
1990	25,874	+0.20%
1999	25,595	−0.12%
2007	26,401	+0.39%
2012	25,645	−0.58%
2017	25,470	−0.14%
2023	25,363	−0.07%

Source: EHESS and INSEE

== Landmarks ==
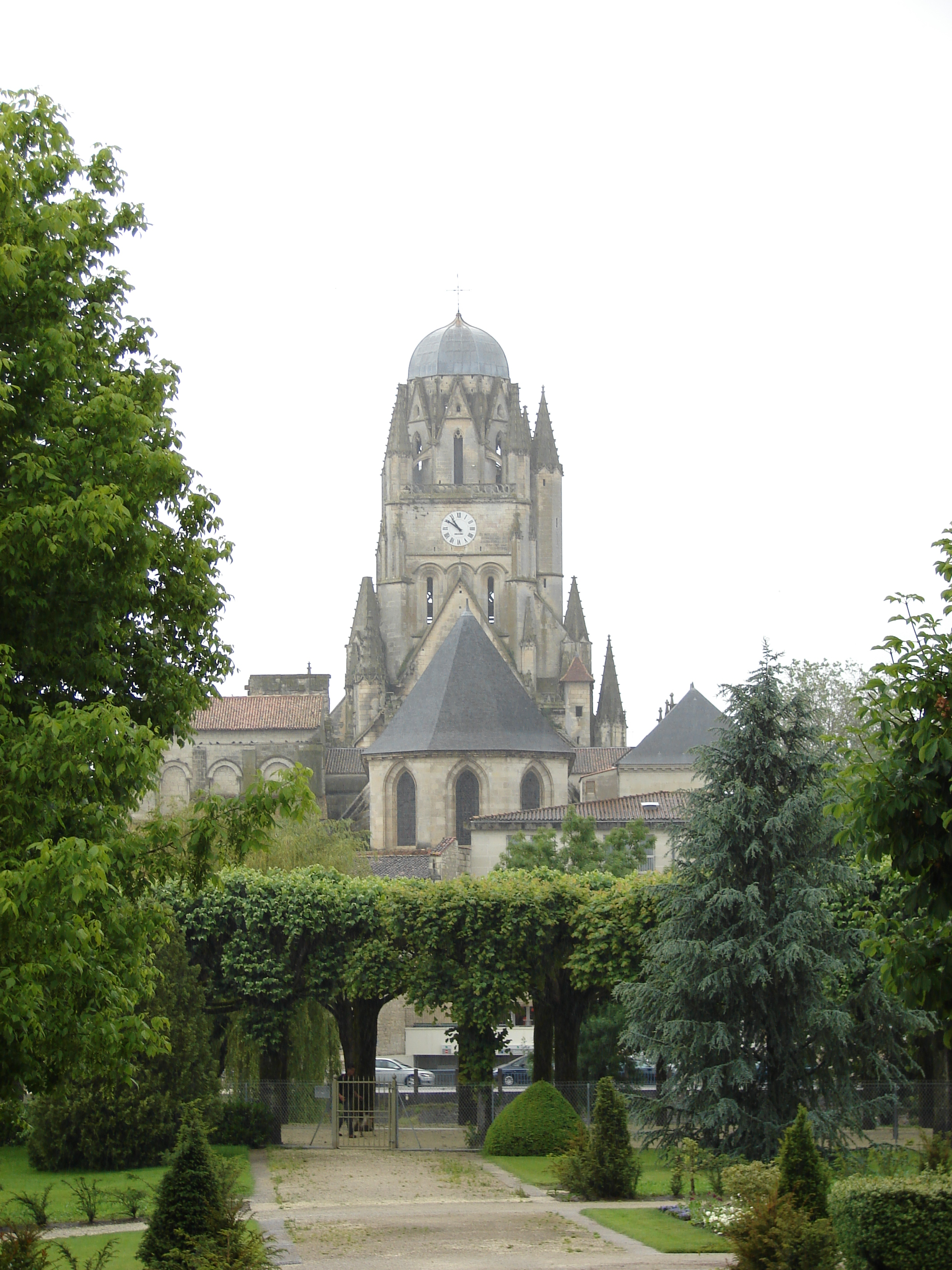
Cathédrale Saint Pierre

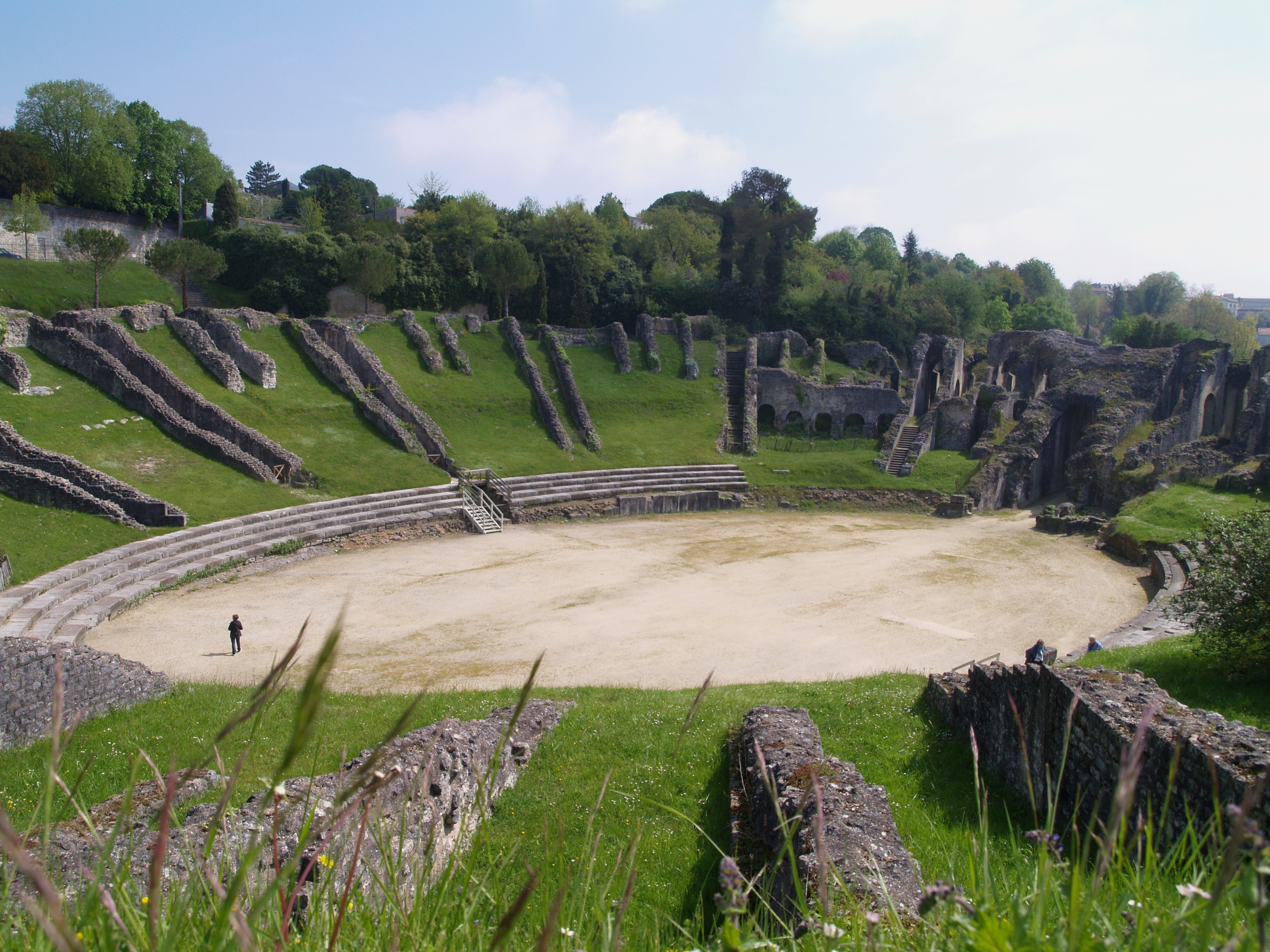
The Roman amphitheater

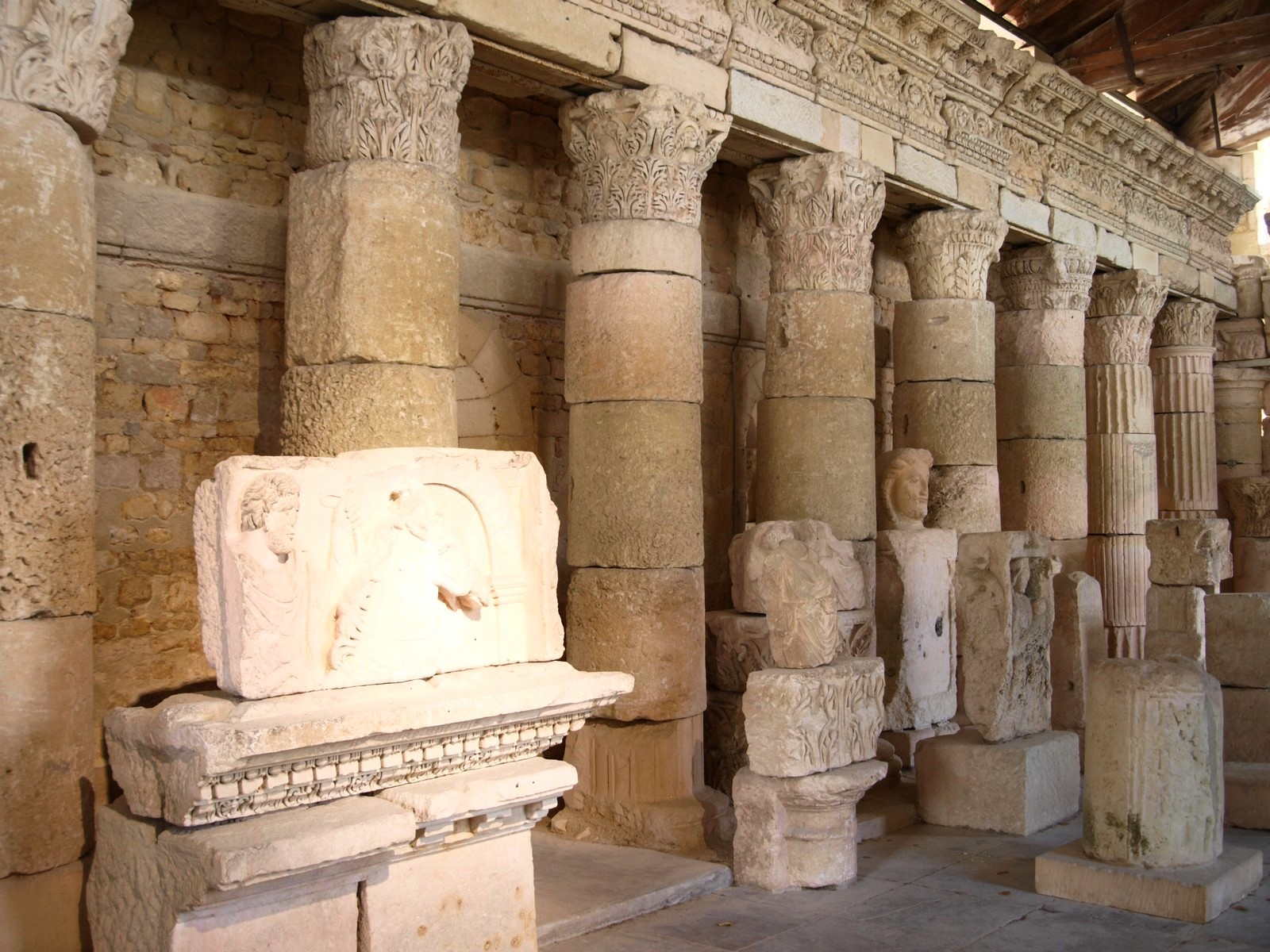
Museum

- The Arch of Germanicus, a triumphal arch, was built at the entrance to a bridge, where the main Roman road crossed the Charente. The bridge was demolished in 1843 but the Arch was saved by Prosper Mérimée and rebuilt at its present location on the bank of the river.
- Ruins of the Roman amphitheatre on the main, left bank of the Charente, near the summit of the hill upon which the town was built. Its notable tiers (cavea) are built against the hill and an embankment.
- Some remnants of the thermae of Saint-Saloine (1st century) are also visible, in particular an aqueduct.
- Fragments of the third century rampart (to the city walls) can be seen in the Place des Récollets. It was built with stones taken from the Roman buildings.
- Ecclesiastical
  - The Abbaye-aux-Dames. Madame de Montespan was educated here.
  - Other churches: the Basilique Saint-Eutrope (Basilica of Saint Eutropius) and the Cathédrale Saint-Pierre, Saintes Cathedral: Basilique Saint-Eutrope: ,
- Museums
  - the Musée archéologique, which has a restored Roman cart/wagon of the first century amongst a collection of sculptures and inscriptions.
  - the Musée du Présidial, which has a mannerist architecture and a collection of regional ceramics and paintings of the 15th to 18th century.
- the Musée de l'Échevinage, which exhibits porcelain of Sèvres and paintings of the 19th and 20th century
- the Hôtel de Ville, which is the meeting place of the town council and dates from around 1874.

== Hospital ==
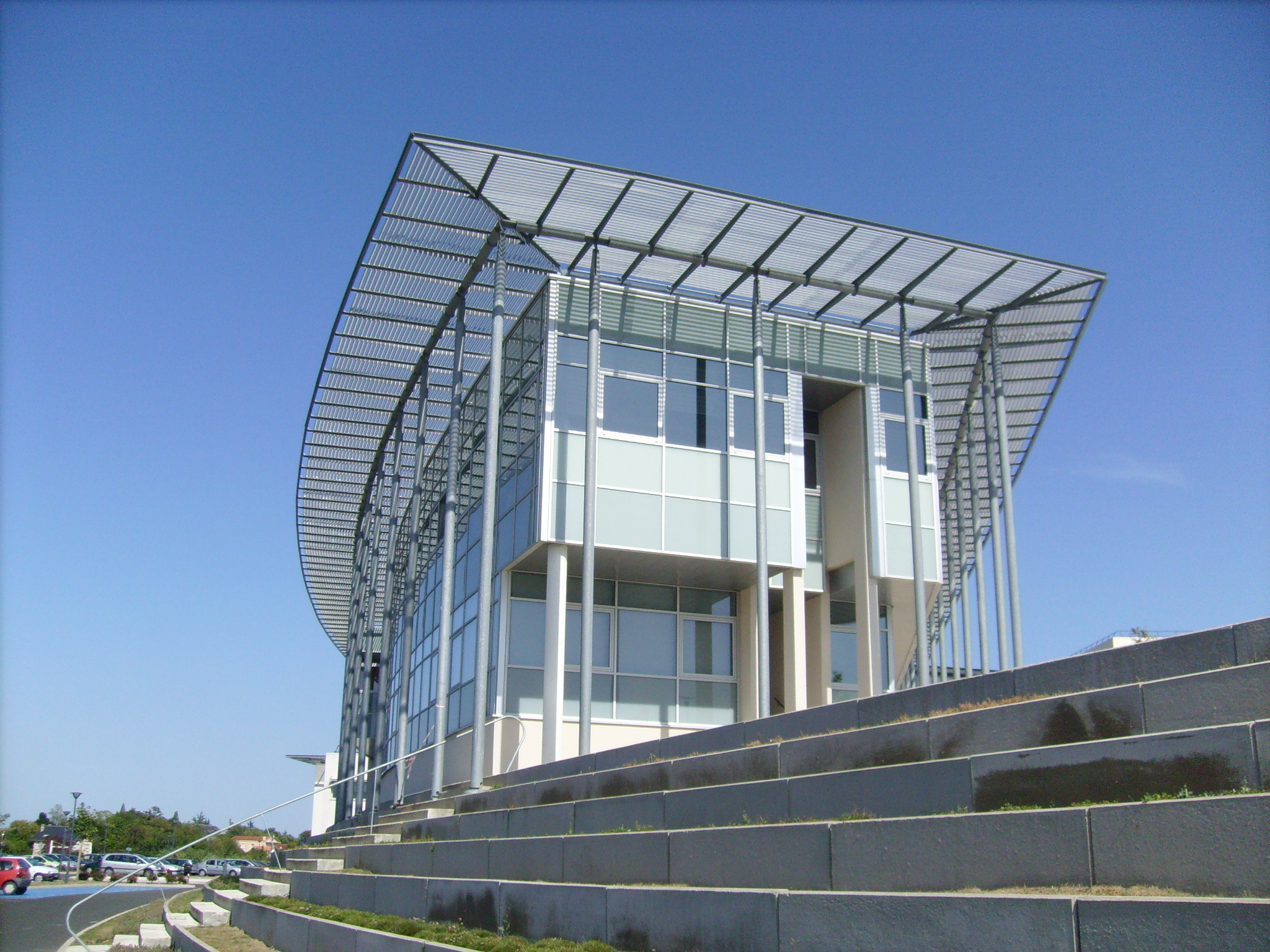
Hospital of Saintes

The hospital of Saintes is the most important hospital centre of the department of Charente-Maritime.

== Education ==
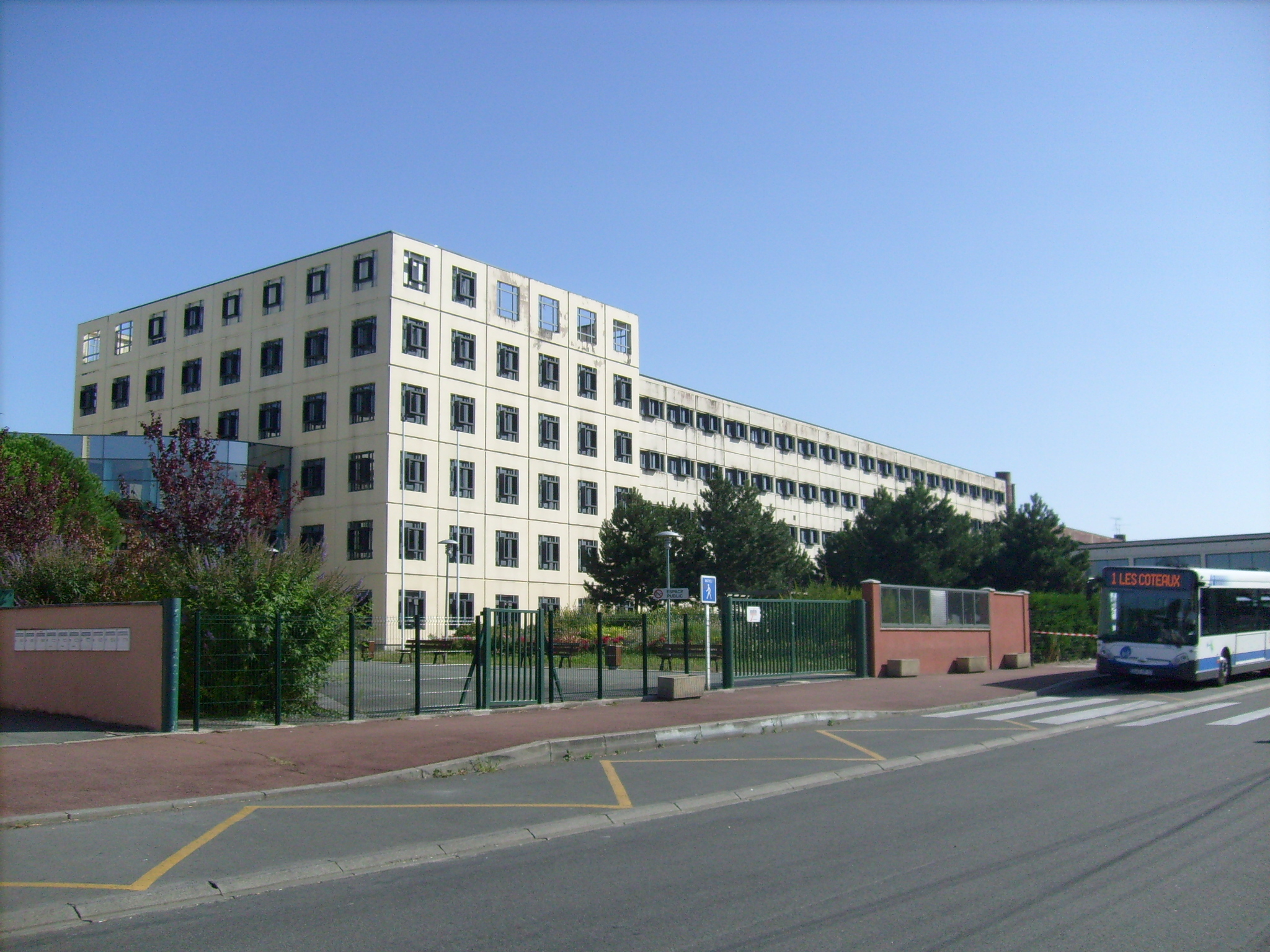
High School Bernard Palissy

Saintes is in the catchment of and under the auspices of the académie de Poitiers.

List of schools :
Public kindergartens and elementary schools: École Le Cormier; École Roger Pérat; École Saint-Pallais; École Saint-Eutrope; École Les Jacobins; École Saint-Exupéry; École Émile Combes; École Jean Jaurès; École Jules Ferry; École Louis Pasteur; École Eugène Pelletan; École Paul Bert; École Nicolas Lemercier; École Léo Lagrange; Private elementary schools: École Marie-Eustelle; École Jeanne d'Arc-Notre-Dame	Public collèges: Collège Edgar Quinet; Collège Agrippa d'Aubigné; Collège René Caillé; Collège privé: Collège Jeanne d'Arc-Notre-Dame; Public lycées of general education: Lycée Bernard Palissy; Lycée polyvalent régional Bellevue; Private lycée of general education: Lycée Notre-Dame-de-Recouvrance	Public professional lycées: Établissement régional d'enseignement adapté; Lycée agricole Georges Desclaude; Lycée professionnel horticole Chadignac; Private professional lycée: Lycée technique Claire Champagne; Military school: École d'enseignement technique de l'armée de l'air (EETAA); Business School: Centre de Formation d'Apprentis en commerce (CFA Chamber of Commerce); Higher education: Institut de formation en soins infirmiers (IFSI); Institut de formation des aides-soignants (IFAS); Centre d'étude d'architecture et d'urbanisme (CEAU)

- Two U.S. universities conduct year round study abroad programs at the C.E.A.U., the University of Houston's Gerald D. Hines College of Architecture, and the University of Southern California.

== Local TV channels ==
France 3 Nouvelle-Aquitaine

Saintes is served by France 3 Nouvelle-Aquitaine.

== Twin towns – sister cities ==
Saintes is twinned with:

- Nivelles, Belgium
- Xanten, Germany
- Timbuktu, Mali
- Vladimir, Russia
- Salisbury, England
- Cuevas del Almanzora, Spain

== See also ==
- Saintongeais language
- Communes of the Charente-Maritime department
- Roman Road from Saintes to Périgueux

== Bibliography ==
- (in French) André Baudrit, Saintes au XVIth siècle, (Thèse de Doctorat, Bordeaux 1957), 745 pages.
- (in French) Jean Combes, Gilles Bernard, Histoire du Poitou et des Pays Charentais, Éditions de Borée, 2001 ISBN 978-2-84494-084-1
- (in French) Robert Favreau, Régis Rech et Yves-Jean Riou (directeurs) Bonnes villes du Poitou et des Pays Charentais (XIIth–XVIIIth siècles), Actes du colloque tenu à Saint-Jean-d’Angély les 24-25 septembre 1999, Société des antiquaires de l'Ouest in Mémoires de la Société des antiquaires de l'Ouest et des Musées de Poitiers, fifth série, tome VIII (2002), à Poitiers. ISBN 2-9519441-0-1
- (in French) Michel Garnier, Christian Gensbeit, À la découverte de Saintes, Patrimoines Médias, 2000, ISBN 2-910137-50-3
- (in French) Daniel Massiou, Histoire politique, civile et religieuse de la Saintonge et de l'Aunis, A.Charrier, libraire-éditeur, Saintes, 1846.
- (in French) Alain Michaud (sous la direction de), Histoire de Saintes, Privat, 1989, ISBN 2-7089-8252-4
- (in French) Pierre Rayssiguier (ouvrage collectif sous la direction de), Saintes, plus de 2,000 ans d'histoire illustrée, Société d'archéologie et d'histoire de la Charente-Maritime, Saintes, 2001
- (in French) Henri Texier, Petite histoire de Saintes, Geste édition, 2003 ISBN 2-84561-092-0
- (in French) Le patrimoine des communes de la Charente-Maritime, éditions Flohic, collection Le patrimoine des communes de France, 2002.
