= Abbaye aux Dames, Saintes =

Abbey in Charente-Maritime, France

Coordinates: 45°44′41″N 0°37′27″W

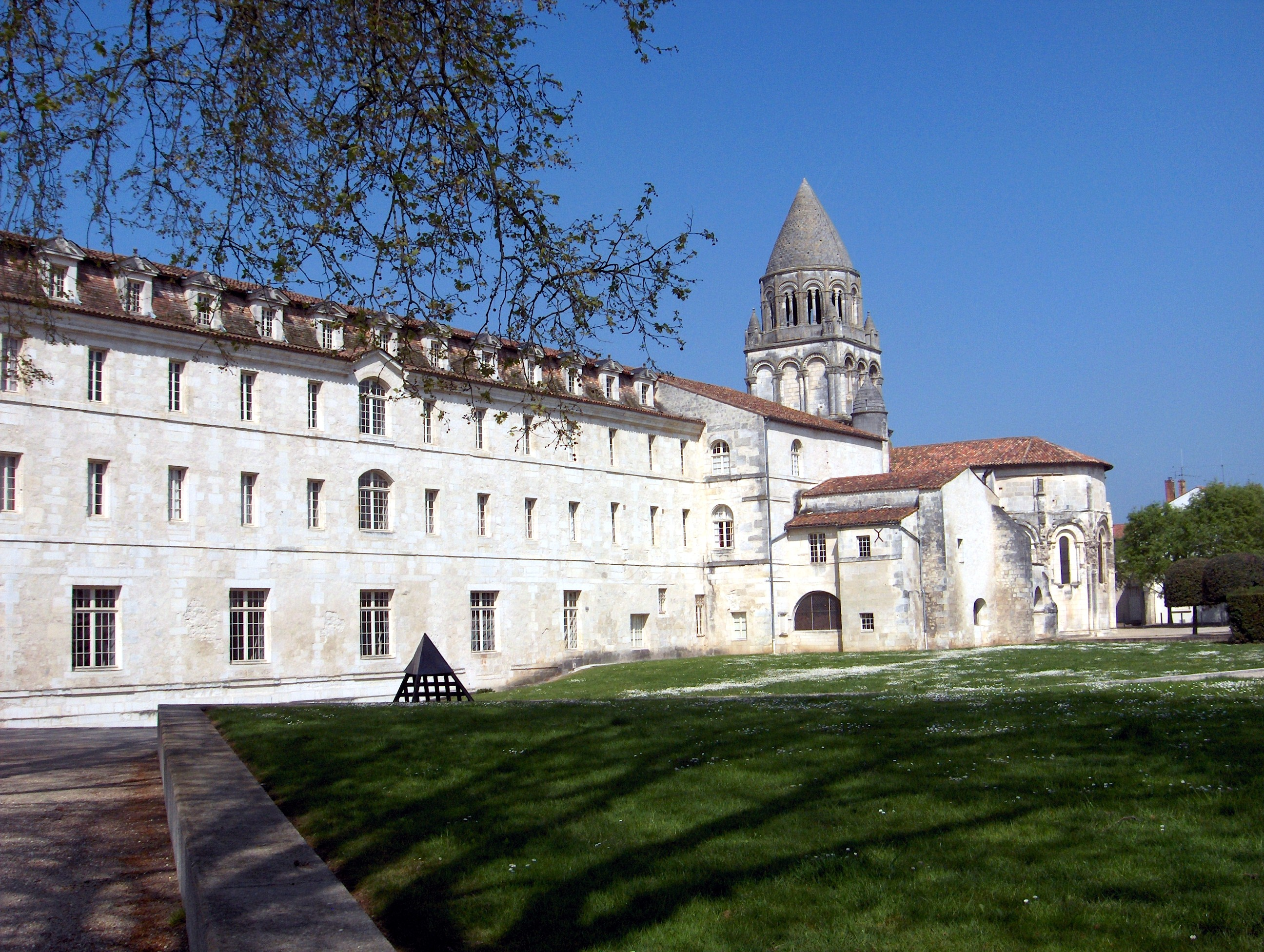
Abbaye aux Dames

The Abbaye aux Dames ("Ladies' Abbey") was the first Benedictine nunnery in Saintes in Charente-Maritime in France.

== History ==
The abbey was founded in 1047 by Geoffrey II, Count of Anjou, and his wife Agnes. Agnes later retired to the nunnery and died there.

One of its abbesses was Agnès of Barbezieux (1134–1174), whose relative, Eleanor of Aquitaine, was a generous donor to the abbey.

Madame de Montespan was educated here in the mid-17th century.

It is located next to the town's Arch of Germanicus and was classified a monument historique in 1948.

== Pictures ==
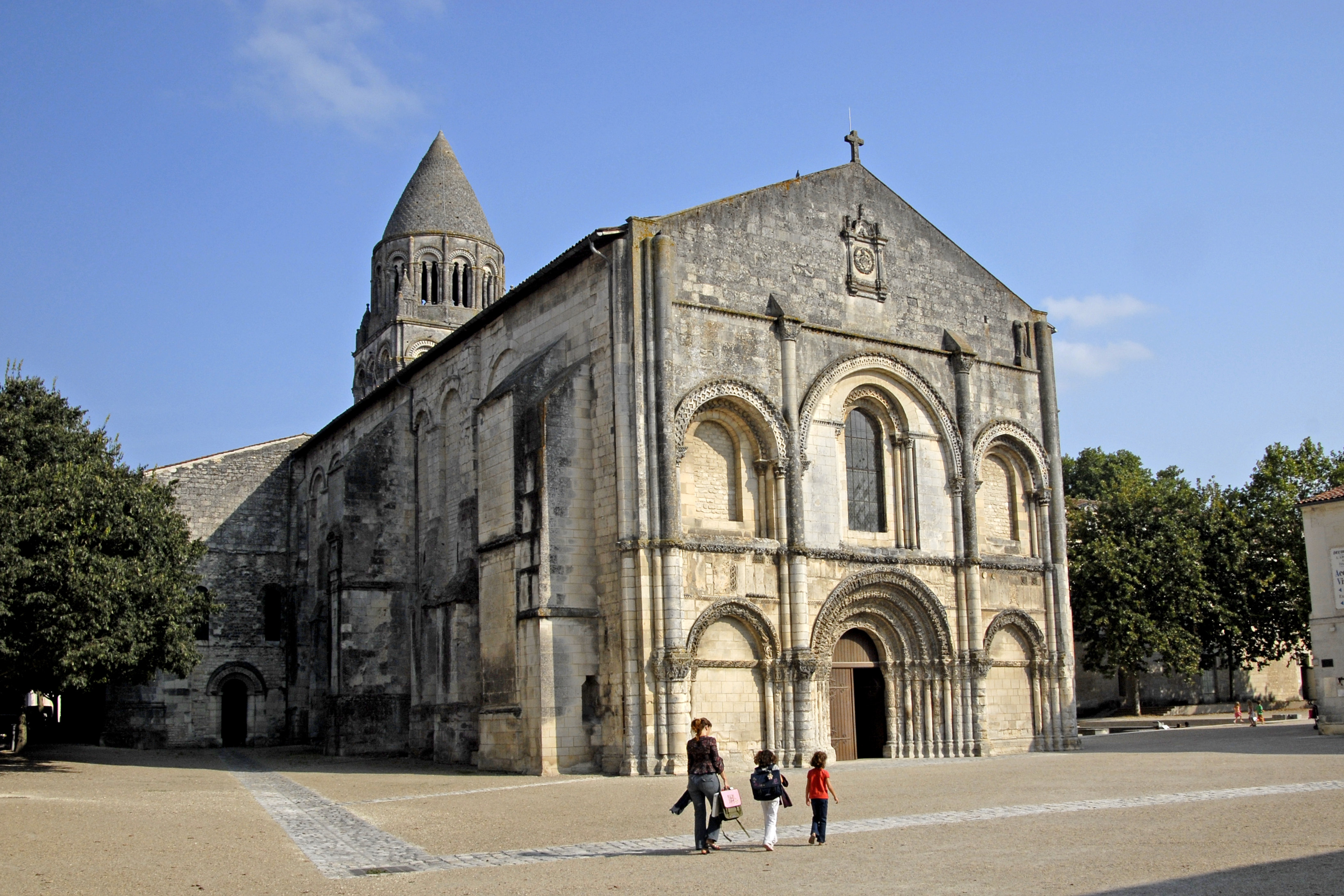
Church

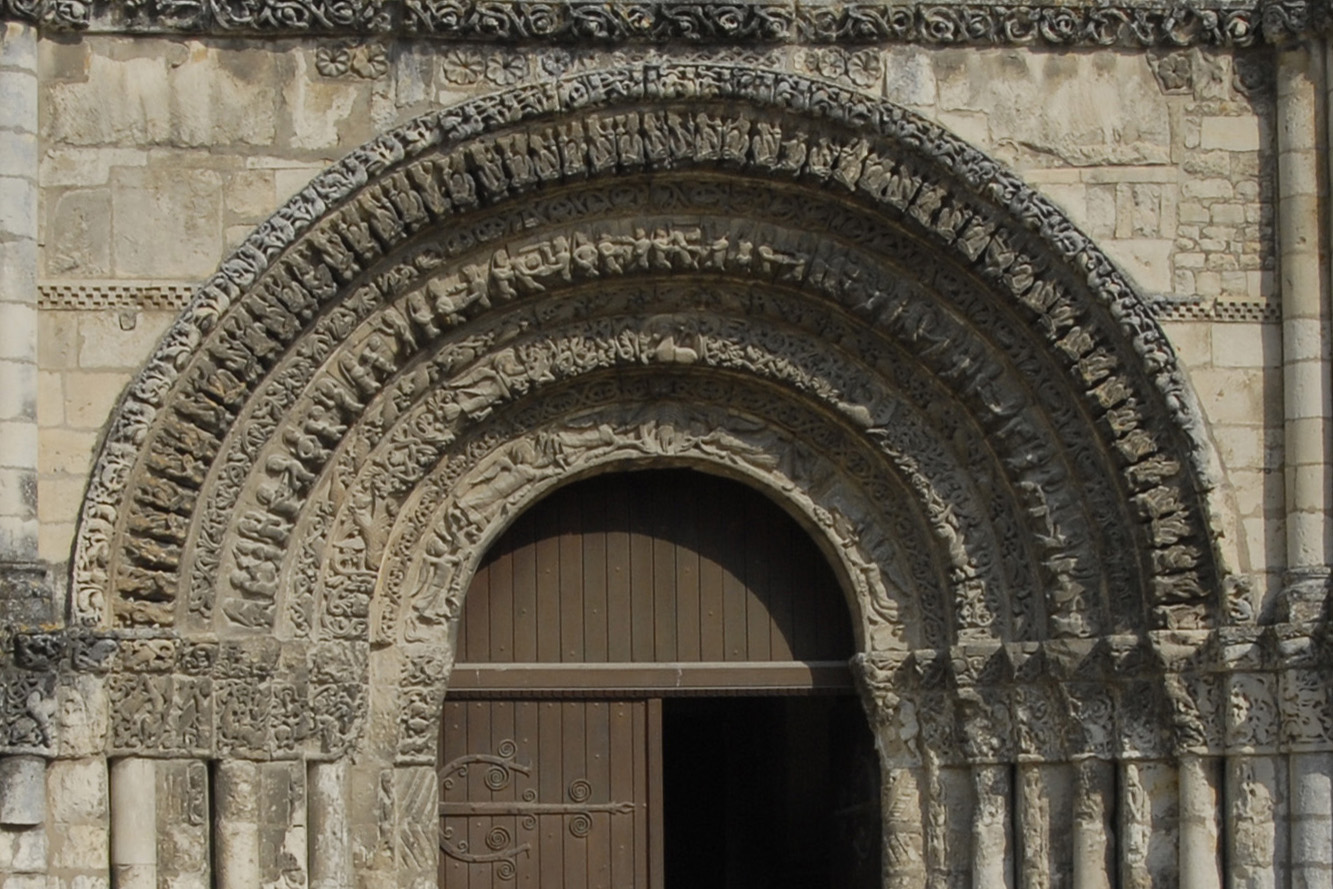
Roman porch

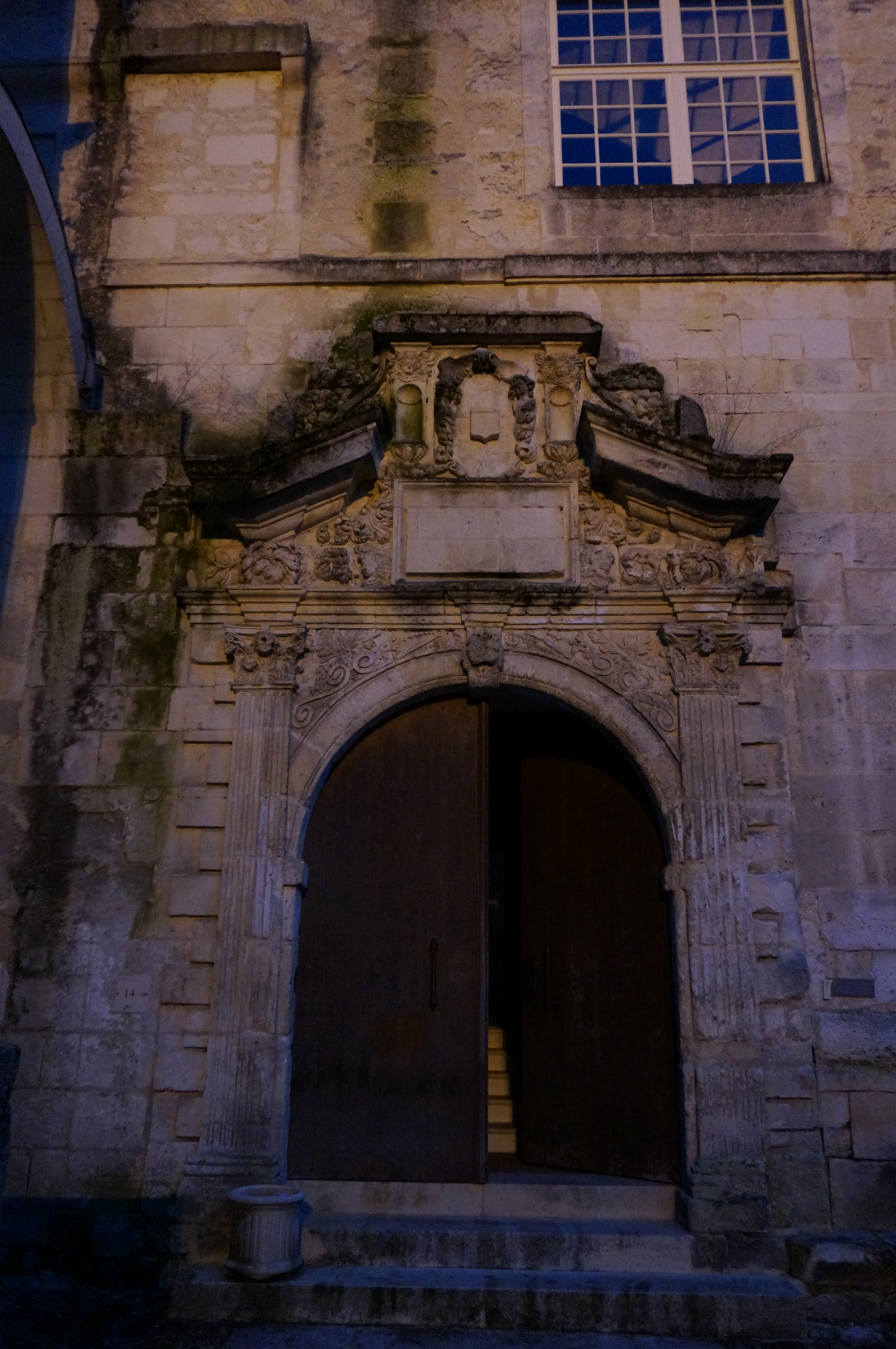
Door

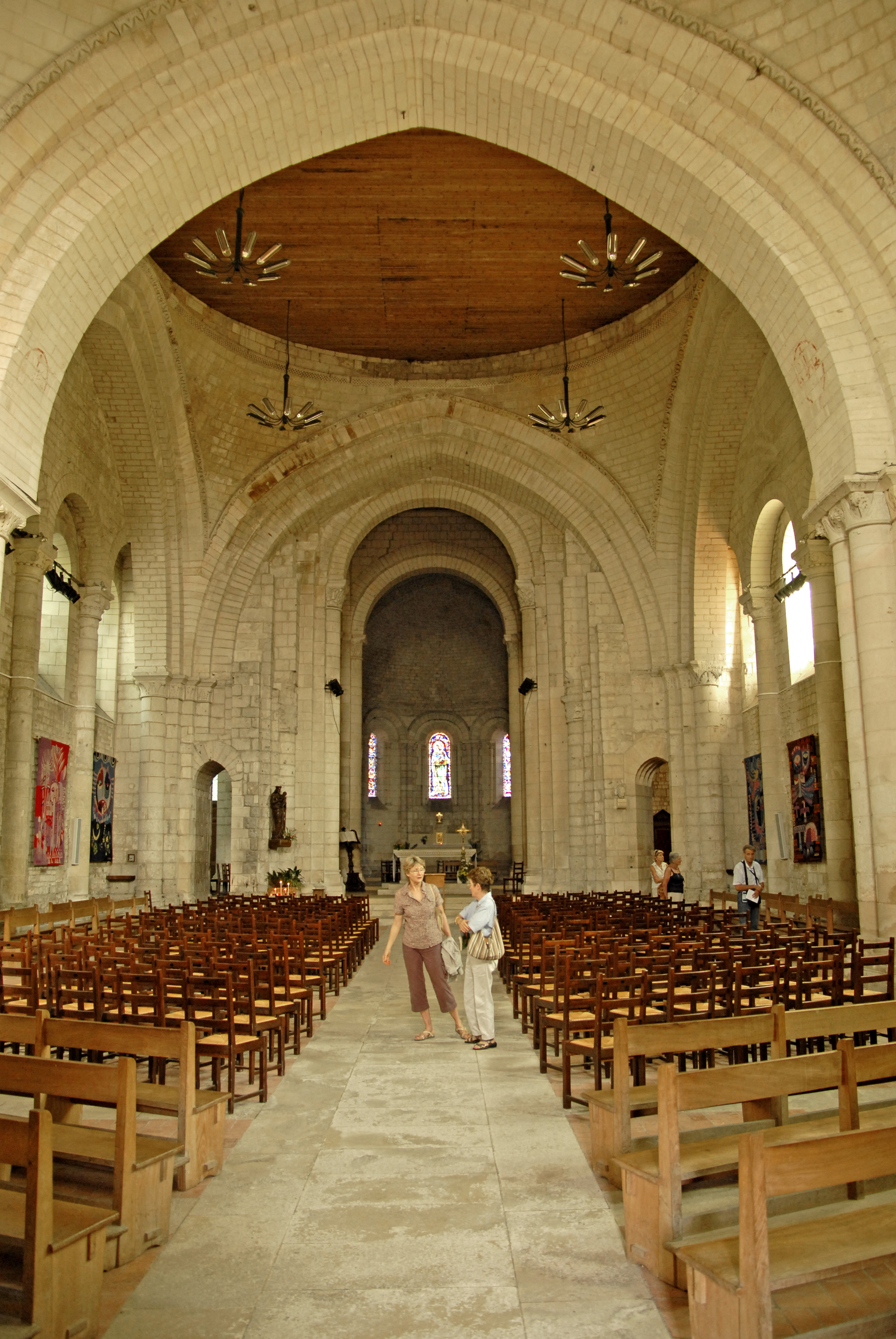
Nave

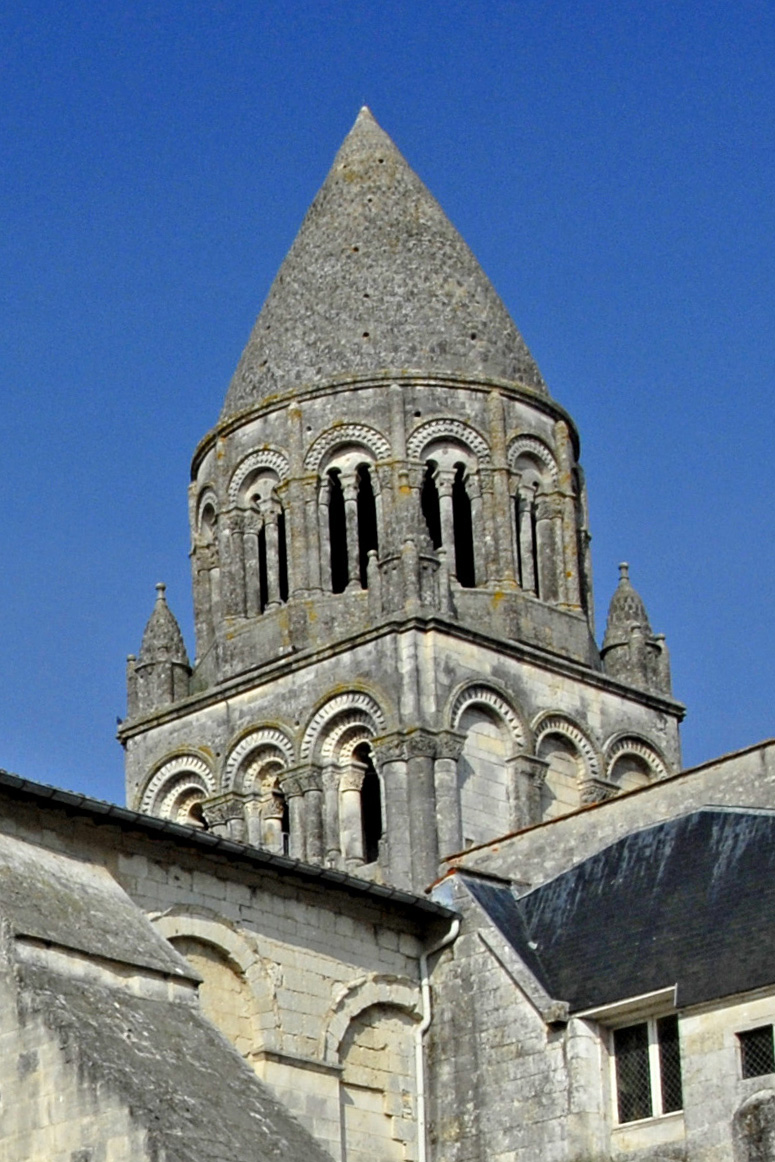

== See also ==
- High medieval domes
