= A837 autoroute =

Road in France

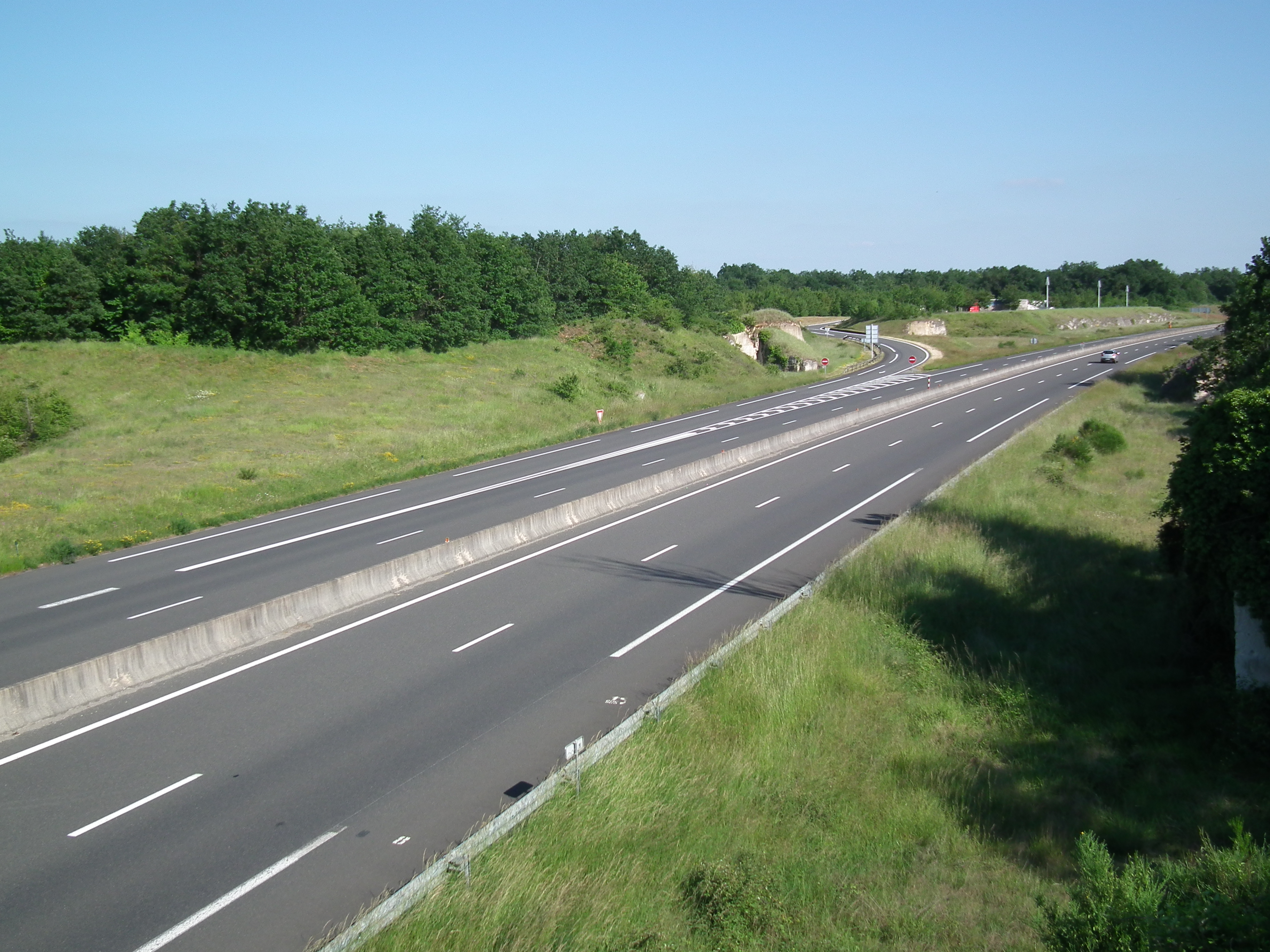
Aerial view of the highway

The A837 autoroute is a motorway in western France it is also known as the Autoroute des Oiseaux.

Approximately 35.7 km (22.2 mi) long, it connects Saintes to Rochefort.

== Junctions ==
- Exchange A10-A837 Junction with A10 to Bordeaux to Paris.
  - Rest Area: La Pierre de Crazannes
  - Rest Area: Les Oiseaux
  - Péage de Cabariot
- 33 (Tonnay-Charente) Towns served: Tonnay
- 32 (Rochefort-nord) Towns served: Rochefort
- 31 (Rochefort centre) Towns served: Rochefort
- Exchange A837-RD137 Autoroute becomes the RD137 to La Rochelle and Nantes.

== European Routes ==
All of the A837 is part of the E602 connecting La Rochelle to Saintes.
