= Saintes Cathedral =

Roman Catholic church and former cathedral in Saintes, France

Coordinates: 45°44′40″N 0°37′55″W

Saintes Cathedral Cathédrale Saint-Pierre de Saintes
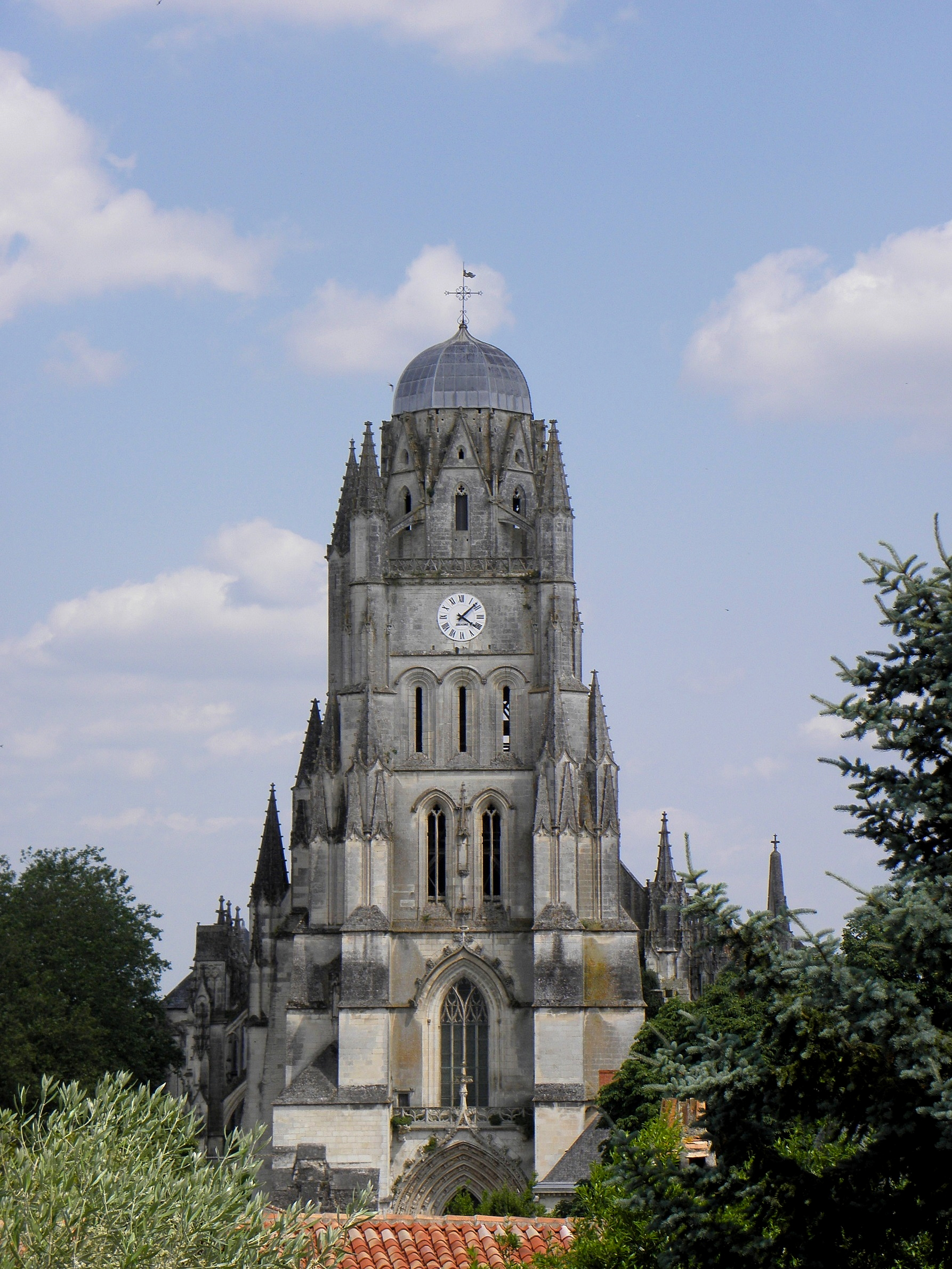

Religion
- Affiliation: Roman Catholic
- Province: Bishop of Saintes
- Region: Charente-Maritime
- Ecclesiastical or organisational status: Cathedral
- Status: Active

Location
- Location: Saintes, France
- Interactive map of Saintes Cathedral; Cathédrale Saint-Pierre de Saintes

Architecture
- Type: church
- Groundbreaking: 12th century
- Completed: 20th century
- Height (max): 81m

Saintes Cathedral (Cathédrale Saint-Pierre de Saintes) is a Roman Catholic church and former cathedral located in Saintes, France. The cathedral is a national monument.

It was formerly the seat of the Bishop of Saintes, a diocese abolished under the Concordat of 1801, when its territory was reallocated, mostly to the Diocese of La Rochelle.

The previous cathedral was built here in the 12th century. Little remains of this building apart from a Romanesque arm and the crossing of the transept. The cloisters date from the 13th century. Otherwise the church was entirely rebuilt starting from 1450, in the Flamboyant style, and work was still not completed in 1568, when during the French Wars of Religion, from which this region suffered particularly severely, the building was sacked by Protestants, causing such serious damage that the nave had afterwards to be entirely rebuilt.

Lack of resources meant that a complete rebuilding has never been possible. The heavy appearance of the tower, for example, results from the lack of the spire intended to finish it, the present dome constituting a more economical substitute.

The interior is made striking by its lack of decoration and by the wooden ceiling, completed in 1927.

== Pictures ==
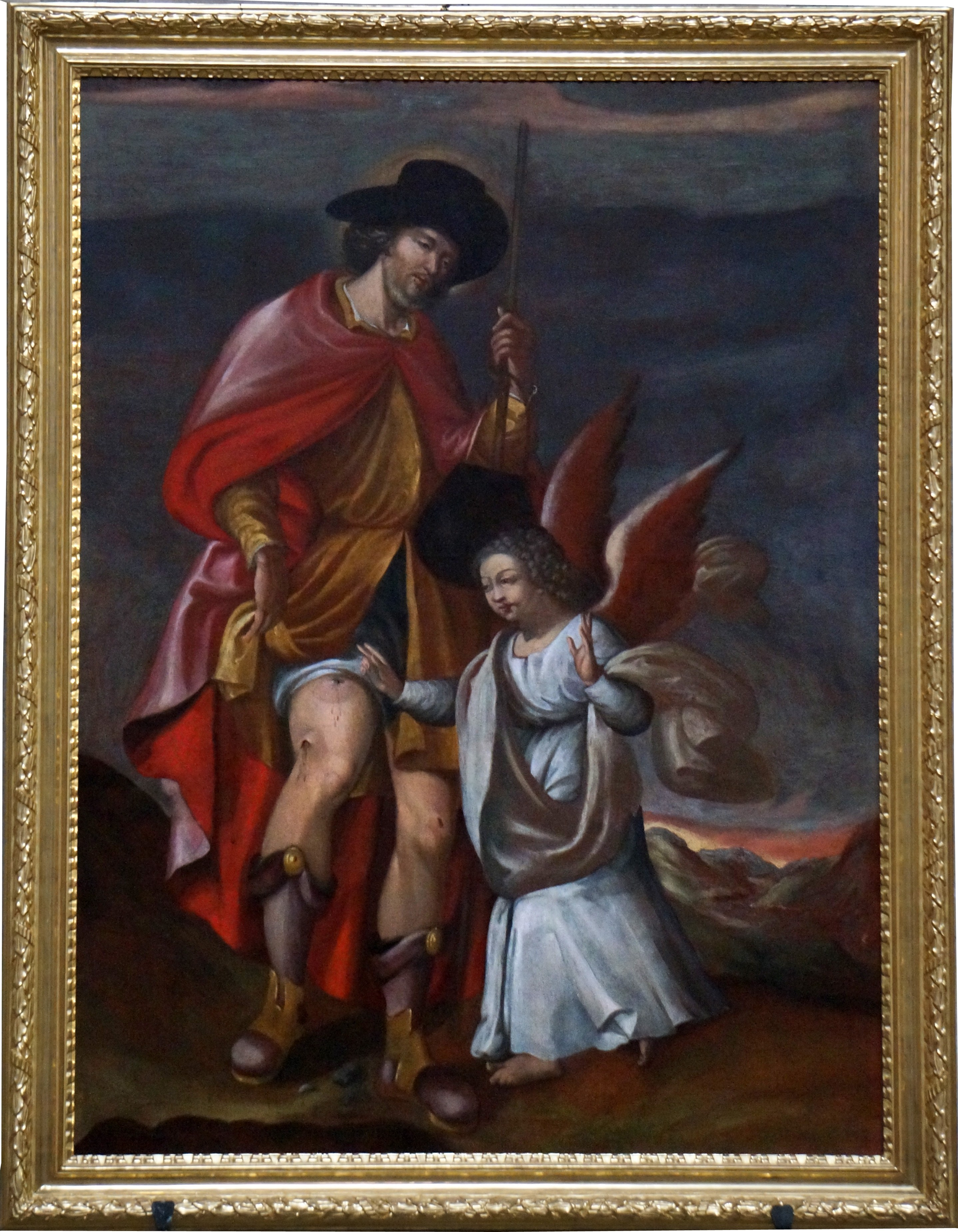
st-Roch, 18th.

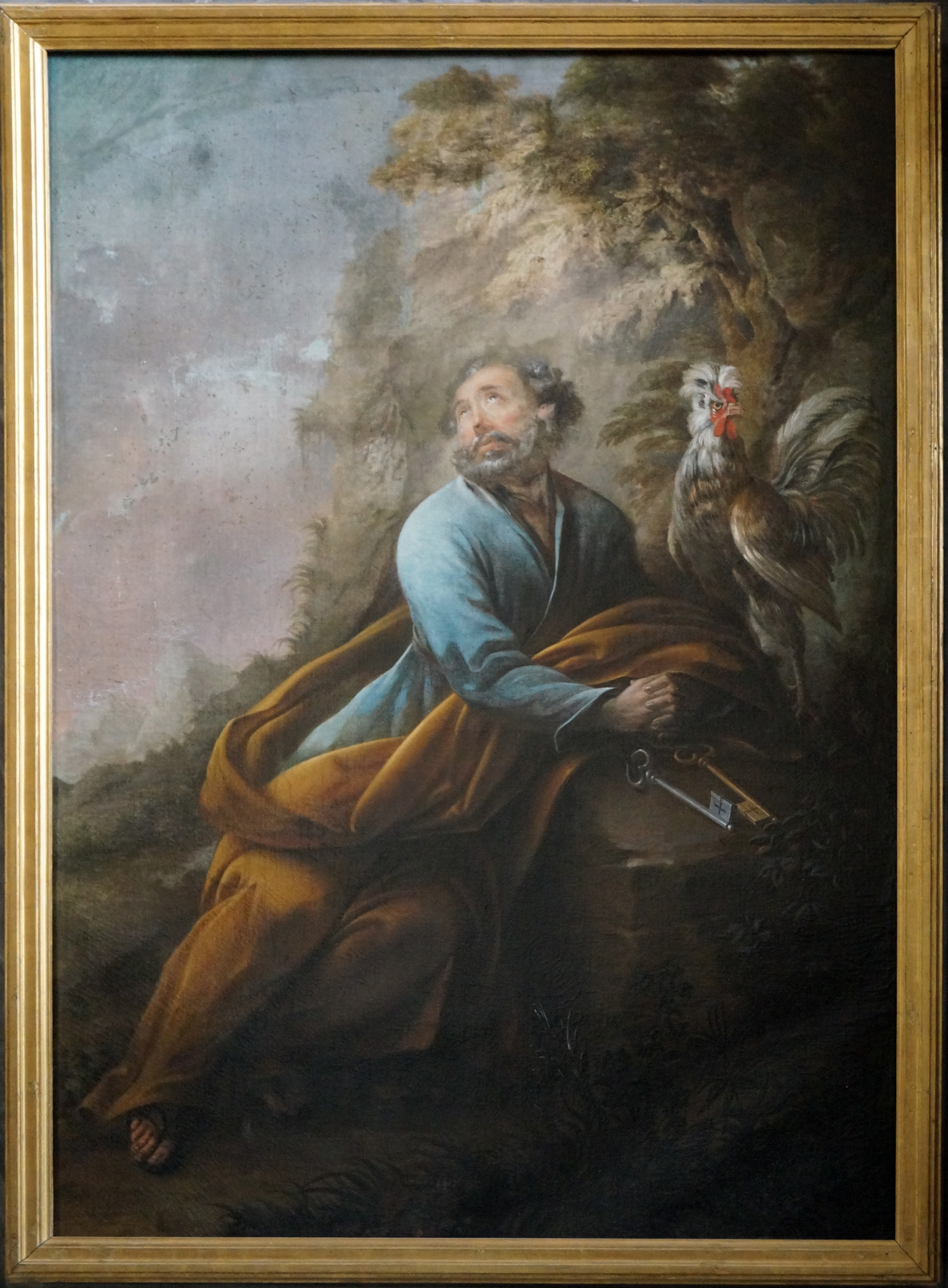
st-Peter, 19th.

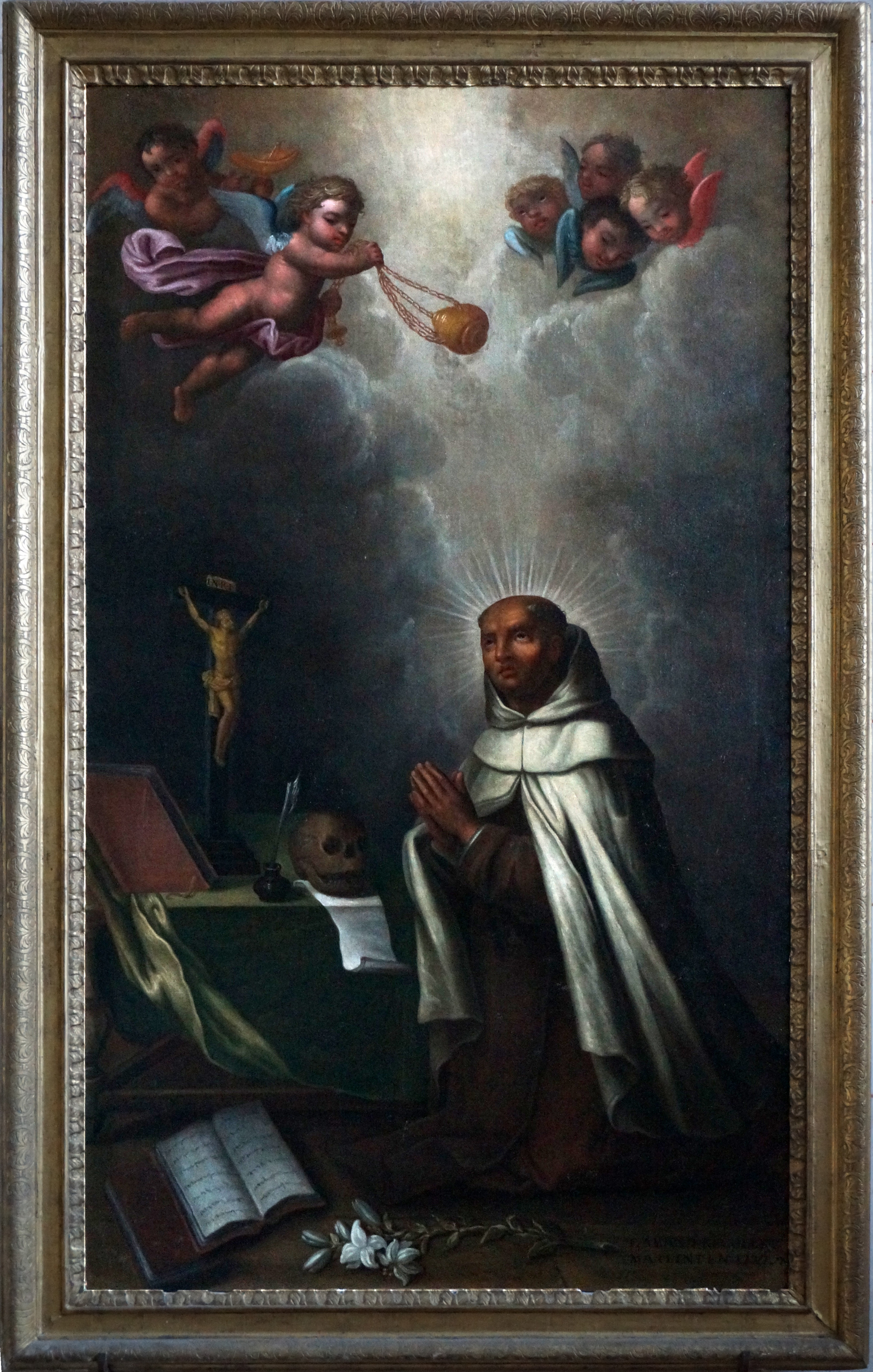
Monk, 18th.

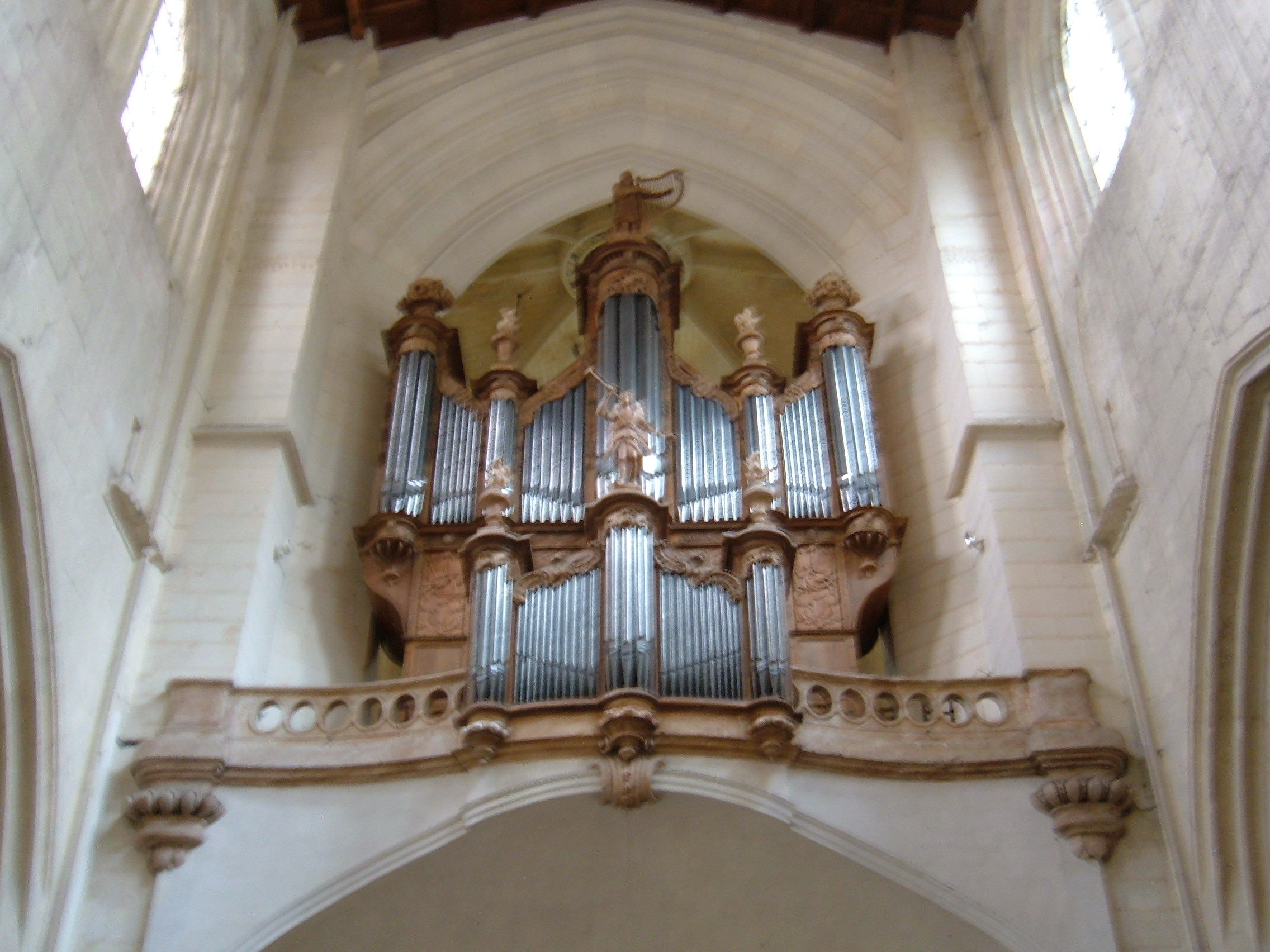
Pipe organs.

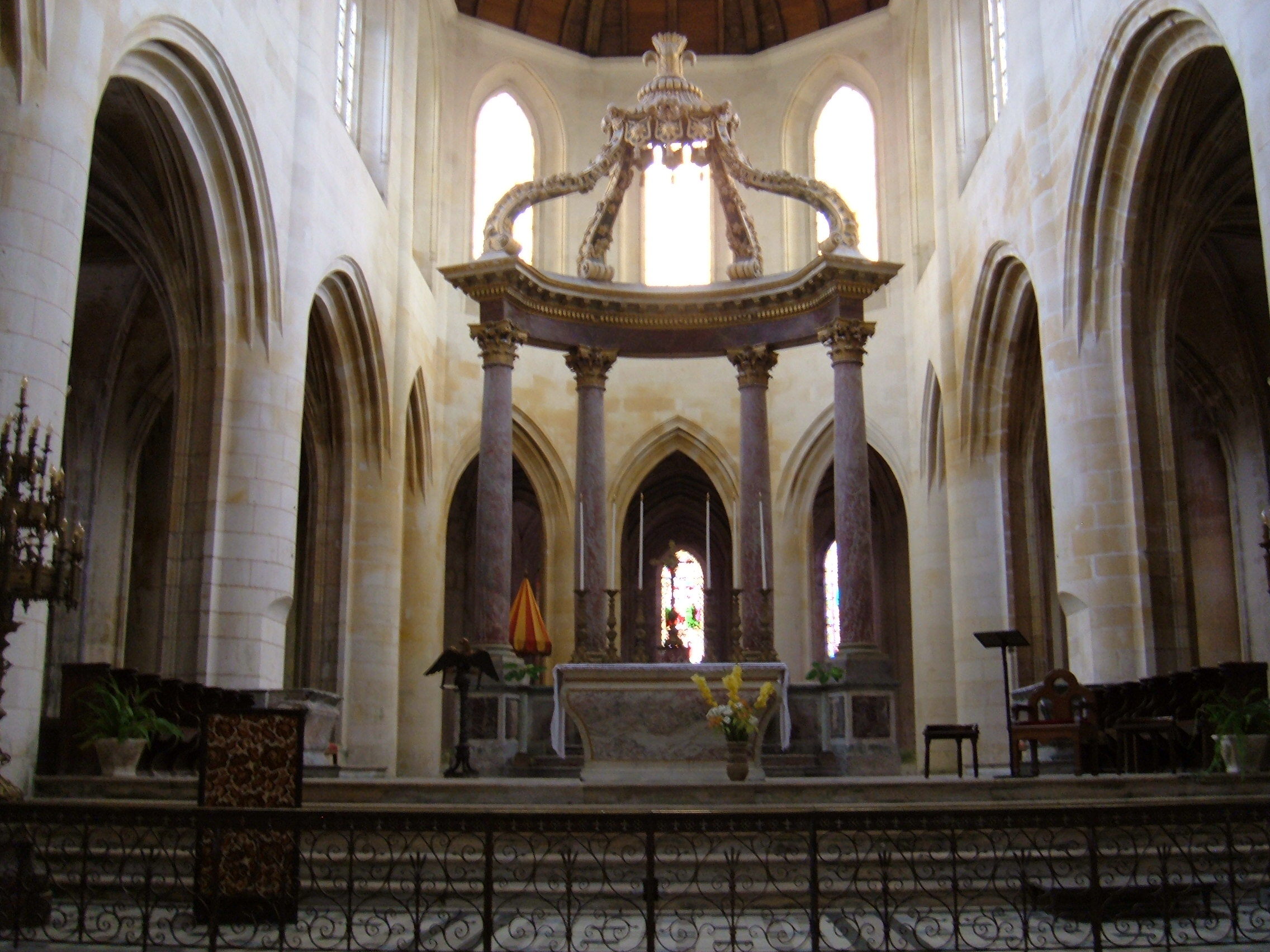
Main altar and ciborium.

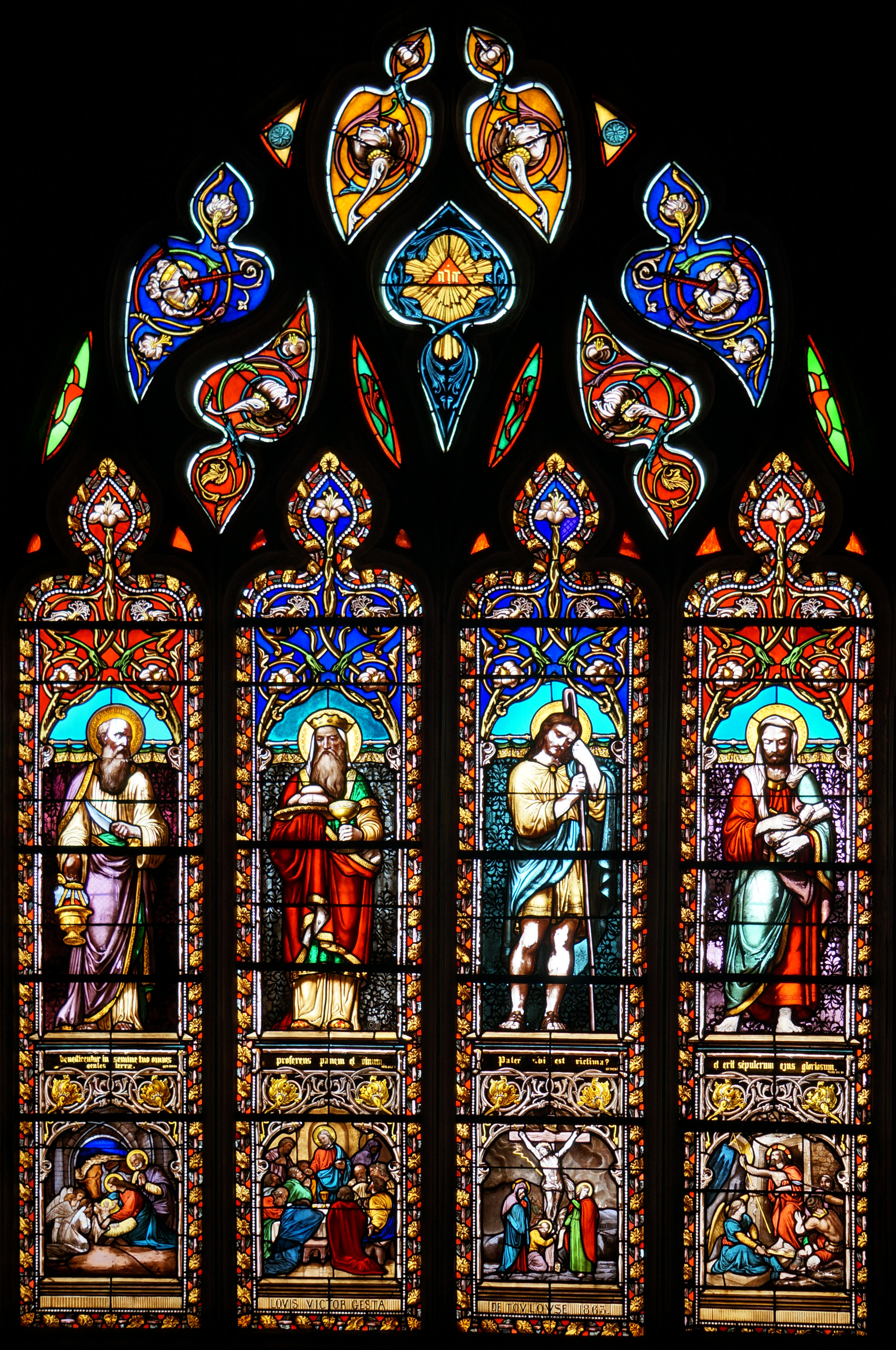
Stained glass window .

== See also ==
- High medieval domes

== Sources ==
- Saint-Pierre Church at Structurae
- (in French) Architecture religieuse en Occident: Saint Pierre de Saintes
- (in French)Ministry of Culture: Archive images of Saintes Cathedral
- (in French)Bernezac.com: Cathédrale Saint-Pierre de Saintes
