= Jordan of Laron =

Jordan of Laron (or Jordain, from either the Latin form Jordanus or Jordanes) was the bishop of Limoges from 1023 until his death in 1051. He came from a family of well-connected lower nobility, the Laron clan of Noblac. His relative and namesake Jordan was the first Bishop of Poland.

Adhemar of Chabannes composed a fictional account of the debates that took place at the council of the Peace movement in 1031, and published them as the conciliar minutes under Jordan's name, a forgery which has duped more than one modern scholar. They are assigned to the bishop's authorship in the Patrologia Latina.

== Disputed election and consecration ==
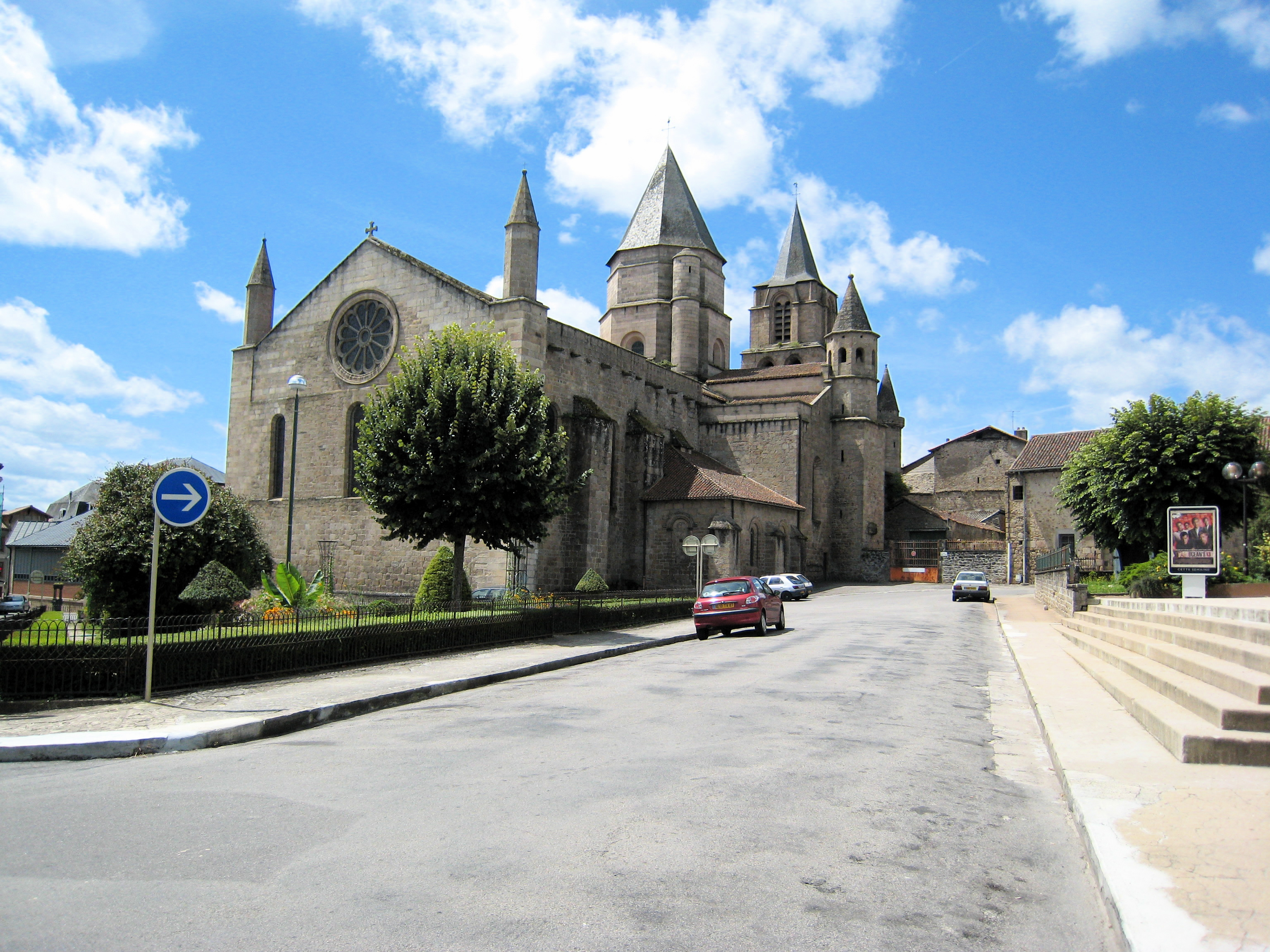
Jordan was elected at the church in Saint-Junien

When Bishop Gerald I died at Charroux in November 1023, tense negotiations ensued to determine his successor. Late in January 1024, at Saint-Junien, Jordan, the lay provost (prepositus) of Saint-Leonard of Noblat and from the ranks of the castellans, was chosen, in opposition to the preference of the family of the Viscounts of Limoges for one of their own. He was quickly shaved and hastily promoted through the various ecclesiastical ranks until he could be consecrated by the Archbishop of Bordeaux, who was an ally of Duke William V of Aquitaine and whose diocese lay within the duke's domains, rather than by the legitimate metropolitan of Limoges, the Archbishop of Bourges, who was close to the French kings. The election of Jordan therefore represented a coup for the duke against the viscounts of Limoges and his nominal suzerain, the king, but it also marked a break with reforms associated with the Peace and Truce of God movement. He was consecrated on 14/21 March in Saint-Jean-d'Angély, which William heavily favoured. The duke and the bishop elect were received with a liturgical celebration at Saint-Martial-de-Limoges, where they spent the night before going to the Cathedral of Limoges for Jordan's investiture the next day.

As a defensive preparation for this election and consecration, Roho and William II, respectively Bishop and Count of the Angoumois region, who were both destined to play roles in the Lenten procession accompanying the consecration, commissioned Adhemar of Chabannes, a monk of the abbey of Saint-Cybard outside the walls of Angoulême, to compile some relevant texts of canon law dealing with episcopal ordination. Adhemar first went to the Cathedral of Angoulême and later to the city of Limoges, leaving marginalia in the manuscripts of the libraries as evidence of his presence, to copy texts and make notes. The final work defended the ordination of bishops per saltum ("by a leap", i.e. raised from non-clerical rank), such as the cases of Jordan and his predecessor, as a guard against highly politicised ecclesiastical procedures.

== Excommunication and submission to Bourges ==
On 24 May (Pentecost) 1024, Gauzlin, Archbishop of Bourges, excommunicated the entire Limousin and appealed for support to his half-brother the king of France, Robert II. At a royal council held in Paris during Pentecost, Gauzlin excommunicated the whole of Aquitaine save the abbey and lands of Saint-Martial. With ducal support, Jordan refused to budge. On 6 March 1025 he was present in a council (placitum) held in the city of Poitiers under Duke William V. One of the purposes of the council was to determine how to pursue the candidacy of William's son by Adalmode, William the Fat, for the vacant Kingdom of Italy. By late in 1025 William's policy had so changed—he needed royal support for his son's Italian ambitions—that the bishop was forced to concede. Jordan, accompanied by one hundred Limousin monks and clerics, journeyed barefoot to Bourges for his consecration by Gauzlin. According to Adhemar, this represented true piety and not defeat, since the penitents could have (successfully, in the monk's mind) appealed Gauzlin's excommunication to Rome on account of his simony.

== Cults of Leonard and Martial ==
During his episcopate Jordan did much to spread the cult of Saint Leonard of Noblac, which up to then was relatively unknown. He asked Fulbert of Chartres and Hildegar of Poitiers in a letter to supply the appropriate hagiography, and the earliest versions of the Vita Leonardi (Life of Saint Leonard) date from this period, sometimes even being ascribed to Jordan's pen. Leonard's vita is therefore a "purely literary creation" originating with Jordan.

From 29 July to 2 August 1029 a local synod was held under Jordan's presidency in Limoges in order to approve a new liturgy and the apostolicity of Saint Martial. The last day of the synod the relics of the saint were moved from his monastery to the cathedral, which was dedicated to Saint Stephen, whose feast day was 3 August, which also happened to be the day Martial had been consecrated as a bishop and was to be the date of the first celebration of his new liturgy. Jordan threatened anyone who denied the apostolicity of Martial with excommunication. The visiting Italian monk Benedict of Chiusa defied this order, reprimanded the monks of Saint-Martial for trying to bypass the ecclesiastical hierarchy and for not holding a general council of the realm (Aquitaine). He reported that everybody in Limoges feared the bishop's decree, and that the canons of the cathedral were thankful for his presence. Adhemar records that new missals were distributed among the ecclesiastical communities of the diocese, perhaps gifts from Jordan.

== Regulating the diocese ==
In September 1027, Jordan and his mother made a donation to the almonry of the abbey of Saint-Martial. On 15 July 1028, according to Geoffrey of Vigeois, Jordan consecrated the monastery of Saint-Pardulf d'Arnac. On 3 September he may have consecrated the cathedral to Saint Stephen.

Around 1035 Jordan granted a castle to a certain Bernard, who swore fidelitas (fealty) to him and promised not to aid the bishop's enemies, nor to deliver the castle over to them, and to surrender the castle upon demand. This transaction contains an early recorded instance of specified exceptions to the above clauses, which were typical of such arrangements at the time.

In 1045 Jordan issued a charter to Duke William VII of Aquitaine regulating the election of future bishops of Limoges. The charter was given "in the presence of noblemen, clergy and laymen". Jordan was present in 1048 when Duke William gave some land for the foundation of a monastery.

== Notes ==
Preceded by Gerald I	Bishop of Limoges; 1024–1051	Succeeded by Iterius
