= Hildegar =

Hildegar (also Hildiger or Hildeger, French Hildegare or Hildegaire) is a masculine given name of Germanic origin. It may refer to:

- Hildegar (bishop of Cologne), ruled 750–53
- Hildegar (bishop of Meaux), ruled 856–76
- Hildegar (bishop of Beauvais), ruled 933–72
- Hildegar (bishop of Limoges), ruled 977–90
- Hildegar of Chartres, floruit 1022–26, scholar
