= Charroux =

Charroux may refer to:

== Places ==
- Charroux, Allier, commune in the department of Allier, France
- Charroux, Vienne, commune in the department of Vienne, France
- Charroux Abbey, in Charroux, Vienne, France

== People with the surname ==
- Gaby Charroux (born 1942), French politician
- Robert Charroux, French writer
