= Turpio =

Count of Angoulême

Turpio (or Turpion; died 4 October 863) was a Count of Angoulême in the Frankish empire. The sources are contradictory concerning the date of his appointment as count and his allegiance, but they agree that he died trying to fend off a raid by the Vikings.

In 838, when the Emperor Louis the Pious led an army into Aquitaine to put down the rebellion of his grandson Pepin, he replaced the counts who had rallied to Pepin—such as Turpio's brother Emeno, Count of Poitou—with appointees of his own. According to Adhemar of Chabannes, writing in the early 11th century, Turpio was appointed Count of Angoulême. However, Lupus of Ferrières, in a letter dated 840, addressed to either Abbot Marcward of Prüm or perhaps Bishop Jonas of Orléans, makes a certain Rainald (Reinoldus), not Turpio, the new Count of Angoulême, and implies that Turpio was on the side of Pepin.

Whenever Turpio's tenure began, its main feature was a series of Viking raids, culminating in the great raid of 862–63, in which they allied with Pepin, besieged Toulouse and raided the Angoumois, killing Turpio in battle. The Chronicon Aquitanicum records, under the year 863, that "Turpio, count of Angoulême, fought with the Northmen, killing their king, named Maurum, and himself being killed." The Annales Engolismenses provide a date for the battle, and Turpio's death: the fourth day of the nones of October 863. Their account is more detailed:

Count Turpio—a most strong knight and the best defender, a magnificent man, a lover of the clergy, a builder of churches and one who restored the poor—joined the Northmen in battle, and killed Mauro, only then to be killed; and the whole region was captured and burned.

Turpio was succeeded by his brother Emeno, who is recorded as Count of Angoulême at the time of his death in 866.
