= 1051 =

Calendar year

1051 in various calendars
- Gregorian calendar: 1051; MLI
- Ab urbe condita: 1804
- Armenian calendar: 500; ԹՎ Շ
- Assyrian calendar: 5801
- Balinese saka calendar: 972–973
- Bengali calendar: 457–458
- Berber calendar: 2001
- English Regnal year: N/A
- Buddhist calendar: 1595
- Burmese calendar: 413
- Byzantine calendar: 6559–6560
- Chinese calendar: 庚寅年 (Metal Tiger); 3748 or 3541 — to — 辛卯年 (Metal Rabbit); 3749 or 3542
- Coptic calendar: 767–768
- Discordian calendar: 2217
- Ethiopian calendar: 1043–1044
- Hebrew calendar: 4811–4812
- Hindu calendars
- Vikram Samvat: 1107–1108
- Shaka Samvat: 972–973
- Kali Yuga: 4151–4152
- Holocene calendar: 11051
- Igbo calendar: 51–52
- Iranian calendar: 429–430
- Islamic calendar: 442–443
- Japanese calendar: Eishō 6 (永承６年)
- Javanese calendar: 954–955
- Julian calendar: 1051; MLI
- Korean calendar: 3384
- Minguo calendar: 861 before ROC 民前861年
- Nanakshahi calendar: −417
- Seleucid era: 1362/1363 AG
- Thai solar calendar: 1593–1594
- Tibetan calendar: ལྕགས་ཕོ་སྟག་ལོ་ (male Iron-Tiger); 1177 or 796 or 24 — to — ལྕགས་མོ་ཡོས་ལོ་ (female Iron-Hare); 1178 or 797 or 25

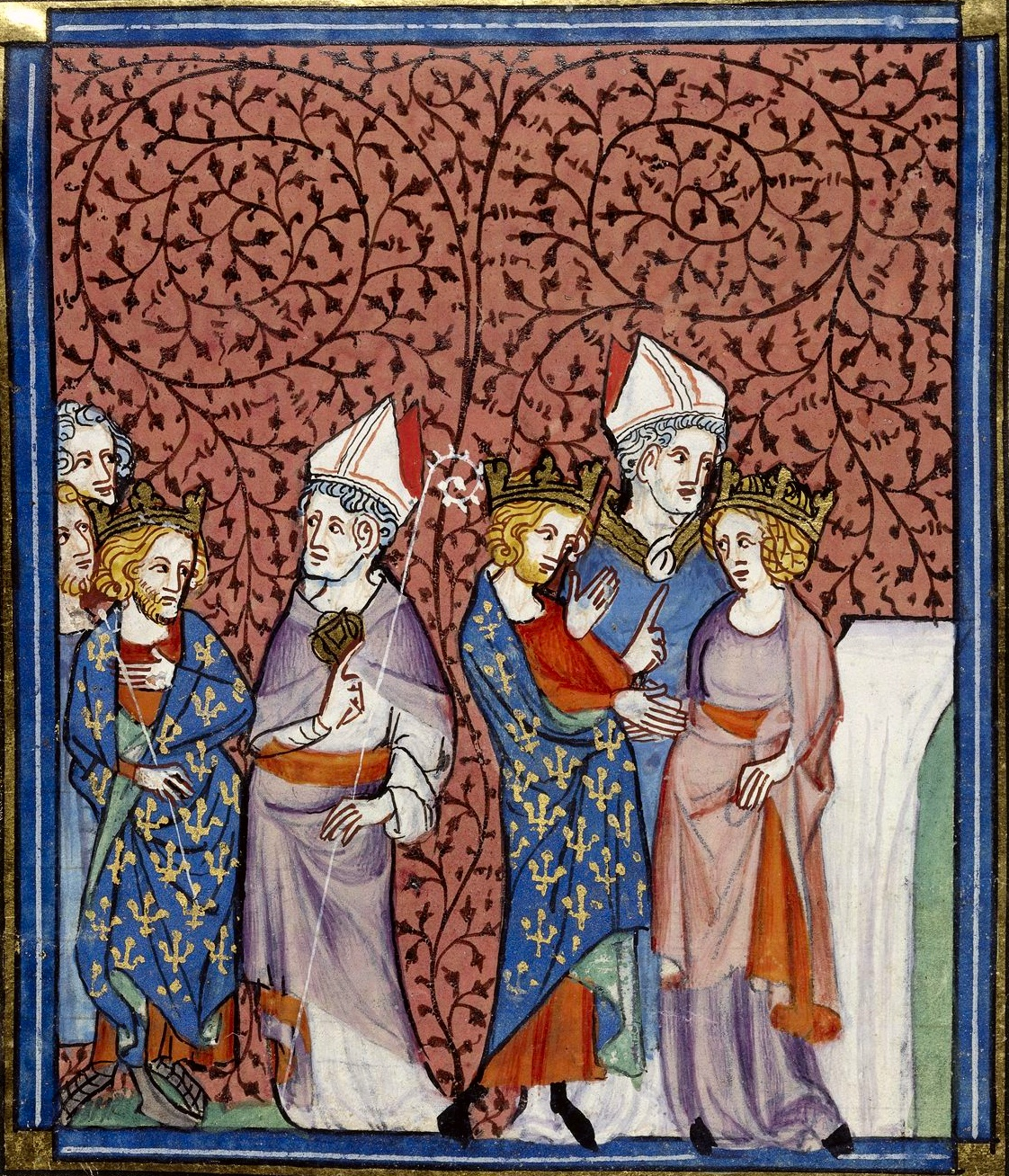
Henry I of France marries Anna of Kiev.

Year 1051 (MLI) was a common year starting on Tuesday of the Julian calendar.

== Events ==
=== By place ===
==== Continental Europe ====
- Spring – William of Normandy consolidates his power in Normandy. He fights over the control of Maine (after the death of Count Hugh IV), and lays siege to the fortresses of Alençon and Domfront (Western France).
- May 19 – King Henry I of France marries Anne of Kiev at the cathedral of Reims. William of Normandy marries Matilda of Flanders, daughter of Count Baldwin V, which Henry sees as a threat to his throne.
- Summer – Drogo of Hauteville, count of Apulia and Calabria, meets Pope Leo IX in southern Italy – who has been sent by Emperor Henry III (the Black) to re-establish the "freedom of the Catholic Church". Drogo is forced to promise Pope Leo to stop the Normans from pillaging the Lombard countryside. On his way back (August 10), Drogo is assassinated near Bovino by a Byzantine conspiracy.
- Autumn – Battle of Vértes: Henry III, Holy Roman Emperor invades the Kingdom of Hungary, and is utterly defeated by Andrew I of Hungary.

==== England ====
- Eustace II, count of Boulogne, visits England and is received with honour at the court by King Edward the Confessor. In Dover a fight breaks out between the Norman visitors and the locals, resulting in the deaths of several people. Edward blames the people of Dover and orders Godwin, earl of Wessex, to deal with them. Godwin refuses to obey Edward's order, and in response Edward raises an army and forces the Godwin family into exile.
- Edward the Confessor invites William of Normandy to England. It is at this point that it is thought that Edward promises the English throne to William in the event of his death.
- Heregeld, commonly known as Danegeld, is abolished by Edward the Confessor. It has been collected for many years to provide funds for defending the country from Viking raiders.

=== By topic ===
==== Religion ====
- Hilarion of Kiev (or Ilarion) becomes the first non-Greek metropolitan bishop of the Eastern Orthodox Church, in Kiev.

== Births ==
- September 21 – Bertha of Savoy, Holy Roman Empress consort (d. 1087)
- Cadwgan ap Bleddyn, Welsh prince of Powys (d. 1111)
- Mi Fu, Chinese painter, poet and calligrapher (d. 1107)
- Approximate date – Robert Curthose, duke of Normandy (d. 1134)

== Deaths ==
- January 22 – Ælfric Puttoc, archbishop of York
- February 28 – Humfrid, archbishop of Magdeburg
- March 14 – Gerard I, bishop of Cambrai
- March 25 – Hugh IV, count of Maine
- April 27 – Fulk Bertrand I, count of Provence
- June 10/11 – Bardo, German abbot and archbishop
- August 10 – Drogo of Hauteville, Norman nobleman, assassinated
- November 7 – Rotho, bishop of Paderborn
- Bernard, margrave of the Nordmark
- Bi Sheng, Chinese artisan and inventor (b. 990)
- Jordan of Laron, bishop of Limoges
- Kálfr Árnason, Norwegian chieftain
- Ralph de Gacé, Norman nobleman
