= Reordination =

Reordination is the second ordination of a cleric whose original ordination is questionable. This may occur when transitioning between different Christian denominations, or if questions arise about the validity of the initial ordination.

== History ==
The Oratorian Jean Morin, in the seventeenth century, and Cardinal Hergenröther, in the nineteenth, designated as "reordinations" the history of all ordinations which were considered null for any other reason than defect of the prescribed form or intention and which were repeated. If there were in fact reordinations corresponding to this definition they were unjustifiable, given the theological view that the sole causes of nullity of the Sacrament of Holy orders are defects of the prescribed form or intention.

Other causes of nullity have been admitted in certain circumstances. It has been admitted that all or any sacraments administered or received extra ecclesiam (outside the Church) were null and had to be repeated. By the words extra ecclesiam is understood the situation of the minister or the Christian separated from the Church by heresy, schism or excommunication. At certain periods these separatists were considered so dangerous and were kept at such a distance that there was a tendency to deny them wholly or in part the power of conferring the sacraments. The maxim, "Out of the Church, no sacraments", was applied with more or less severity.

The Council of Trent declared the validity of baptism administered outside the Church according to the prescribed form and intention; but the validity of confirmation and Holy orders conferred under the same conditions was not defined as a matter of faith, owing to disagreements on these points of tradition. Father Perrone has written:

Ordinationes ab illegitimo ministro peractas illicitus esse, nemo umquam theologorum dubitavit: utrum vero præterea irritæ, inanes ac nullæ habendæ sint, implicatissima olim questio fuit, adeo ut Magister Sententiarum scribat: "Hanc quæstionem perplexam ac pæne insolubilem faciunt doctorum verba, quæ plurimum dissentire videntur" (I, iv, dist. 25); deinde profert quatuor sententias, qui nulli adhæreat. Monumenta ecclesiastica prope innumera pro utraque sententia, sive affirmante irritas esse eiusmodi ordinationes sive negante, stare videntur, cum res nondum eliquata esset. Nunc iam a pluribus sæculis sola viget S. Thomæ doctrina, cui suffragium accessit universæ ecclesiæ, ordinationes ab hæreticis, schismaticis ac simoniacis factas validas omnino esse habendas

That ordinations performed by an unlawful minister are illicit, no theologian ever doubted; but whether they are, moreover, to be regarded as null and void was of old a most intricate question–so much so that the Master of the Sentences writes: "This problem is rendered complex and almost insoluble by the statements of the doctors which show considerable discrepancy" (I, iv, dist. 25). He then presents four opinions, none of which he adopts. For each view –that which affirms and that which denies the nullity of such ordinations– there seemed to be innumerable evidences from church history, as long as the question was not cleared up. But for several centuries past, the teaching of St. Thomas alone has prevailed and is accepted by the whole Church, to the effect that ordinations performed by heretical, schismatical or simoniacal ministers are to be considered as valid ["Tractatus de ordine", cap. iv, n. 136, in Migne, "Theologiæ cursus completus", XXV (Paris, 1841), 55].

In the second half of the fifth century, the Church of Constantinople repeated the confirmation and ordination conferred by the Arians, Ancient Macedonians, Novatians, Quartodecimans, and Apollinarists (Beveridge, "Synodicon", II, Oxford, 1672, Annotationes, 100).

The Roman Synod of 769 permitted and even prescribed the repetition of orders conferred by the antipope Constantine (Liber Pontificalis, ed. Duchesne, I, 408 sqq.). In the ninth century, during the struggle with the chorepiscopi, the ordinations conferred by those prelates were often declared null. In 881-82 Pope John VIII prescribed the reordination of Bishop Joseph of Vercelli, who had been ordained by the Archbishop of Milan, then under the ban of excommunication. On several occasions the ordinations conferred by Pope Formosus were declared null and were repeated.

After the eleventh century the discussions concerning simony gave new sharpness to the controversy about reordinations. Cardinal Humbert affirmed the nullity of simoniacal ordinations, as did also the Synod of Girona (Spain) in 1078. In the strife between the emperors of Germany and the popes of the eleventh and twelfth centuries the power of ordination of schismatic bishops was discussed and denied in various ways (cf. Louis Saltet, "Les réordinations", 205-412). In the thirteenth century the conditions for the validity of holy orders were determined in such a way that since then all uncertainty has been excluded.

== Roman Catholic interpretation ==
Decisions of the popes on these points did not possess the character required by the First Council of the Vatican for definitions involving the sovereign authority of the pope in doctrinal matters. In the history of reordinations the authority of the popes is much less concerned than in the doctrine regarding the relations of the civil and ecclesiastical powers, in which, nevertheless, as theologians maintain, papal infallibility is not involved (cf. J. Fessler, "La vraie et la fausse infallibilité des papes", Paris, 1873).

The early Church sought the solution of these difficulties. Old Catholics and Anglicans often bring charges against the Roman See, which, if they had the value they claim, would tell not only against the popes but also against the early Church and the Fathers. Vincent of Lérins wrote, in his Commonitorium, that "in the Catholic Church itself, all possible care must be taken, that we hold that faith which has been believed everywhere, always, by all."
