= Saint Cybard =

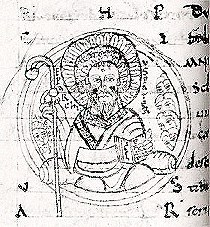
11th-century drawing of Cybard by Adémar de Chabannes.

Saint Cybard (or Eparchius, Eparque, Ybar, Ybard, Separchius, Cybar; 504 – 1 July 581) was a monk and a hermit who inhabited a cave beneath the walls of Angoulême for forty-four years. The Latin form of his name is Eparchius, and it also appears in French as Éparche and Ybars, as in the commune of Saint-Ybars.

== Life ==
Cybard was probably born at Trémolat in the Périgord. He was ordained a priest by Aptonius III, the Bishop of Angoulême, in 542. His story is told in Gregory of Tours Historia Francorum (VI, 8). An anonymous hagiography entitled Vita et virtutes Eparchii reclusi Ecolismensis ("The life and virtues of Eparchius the recluse of Angoulême") tells how "alone he ... walked by night to the spot where he should be a recluse. Having finished his journey and his prayers, he lay down his head on a rock." That spot was, according to the same source, at "a remote location, far from the city, and from above on the side of the mountain trickled a stream of flowing water, and the river Charente started out from there."

The Abbey of Saint-Cybard was built over Cybard's cave after his death, a church in La Rochefoucauld is dedicated to him, and a quarter of Angoulême bears his name. He is the patron saint of the diocese and his feast day is 1 July.

== Butler's account ==
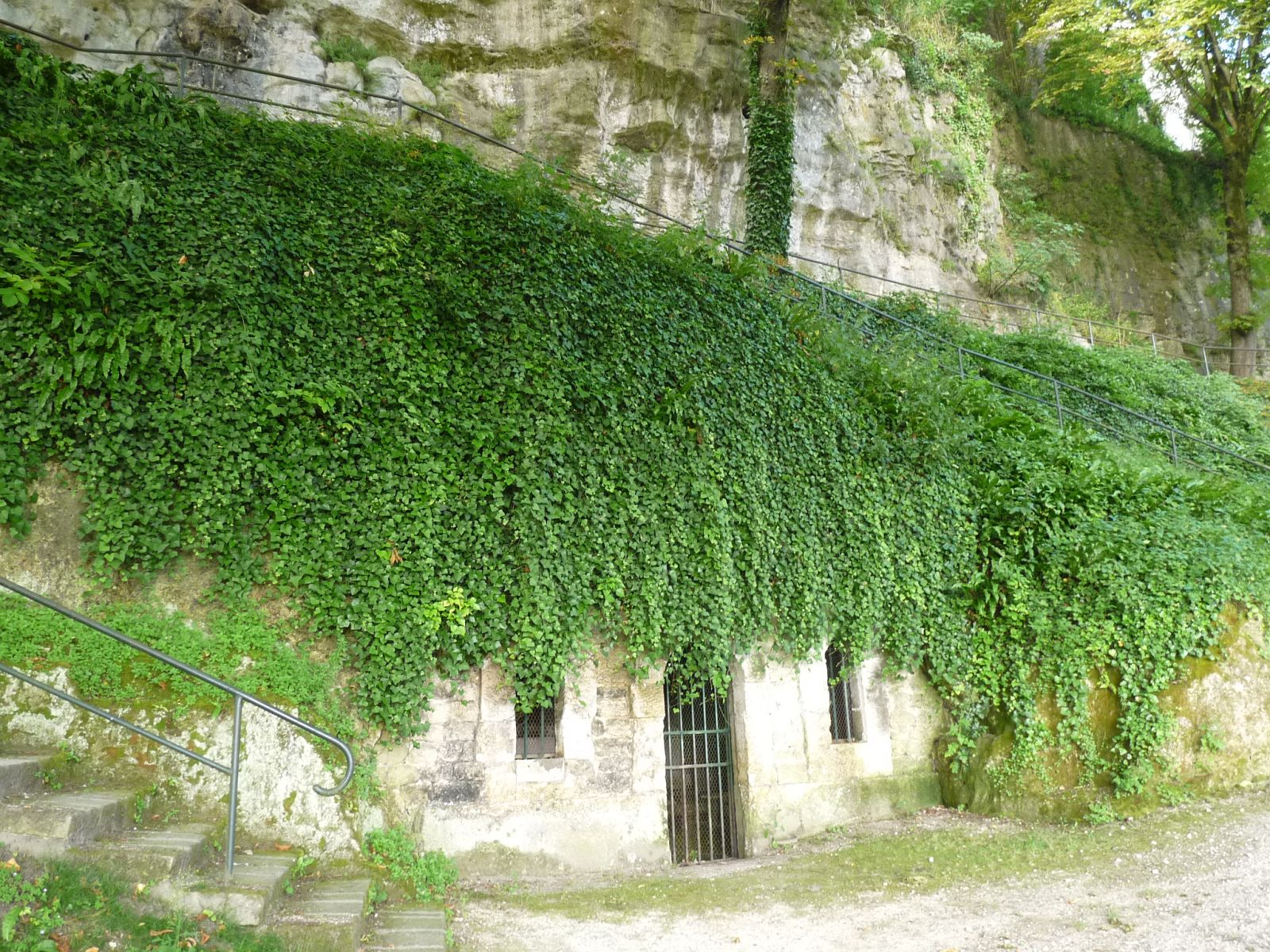
Cave of Saint Cybard at Angoulême

The hagiographer Alban Butler wrote in his Lives of the Primitive Fathers, Martyrs, and Other Principal Saints, under July 1:

St. Cybar, a Recluse at Angouleme

EPARCUS, commonly called Cybar, quitted the world in spite of his parents, who would hinder him to follow his vocation; and retiring to the monastery of Sedaciac, in Perigord, he there served God some time under Abbot Martin, and soon became known and admired for his extraordinary virtues and miracles. Wherefore, in dread of the seduction of vain-glory, he left his monastery to hide himself in absolute solitude. It was near Angouleme, with the bishop of Perigeux’s and his abbot’s leave, he shut himself up in a cell. But his virtues were too striking for concealment, and the bishop of Angouleme obliged him to accept the priesthood. Cybar was extremely austere in his food and apparel, especially during Lent. Although a recluse, he did not refuse to admit disciples; but he would not allow them manual labour, as, after his own example, he willed they should be constantly occupied in prayer. When any of them would complain for want of necessaries, he would tell them, with St. Jerom, that “Faith never feared hunger.” Nor was he deceived in his trust on Providence, as he always found abundance for himself and his disciples in the beneficence of the faithful; insomuch that he was even enabled to redeem a great number of captives. He died on the 1st of July, 581, having lived about forty years in his cell. His relics were kept in the abbey church of his name until 1568, when they were burnt by the Huguenots. See Mabillon, Act. t. 1. p. 267; Bulteau, Histoire de l’Ordre de St. Benoît, t. 1. p. 235; Gallia Chr. Nov. t. 2. p. 978, 979, &c.

== Sources ==
*Butler, Alban (1833), The Lives of the Fathers, Martyrs, and Other Principal Saints: Compiled from Original Monuments and Other Authentic Records, Illustrated with the Remarks of Judicious Modern Critics and Historians, R. Coyne This article incorporates text from this source, which is in the public domain.
