= Hildegar (bishop of Limoges) =

Hildegar (French Hildegare, Hildegaire; died 990) was the bishop of Limoges from 977. He was the son of Gerald, the viscount of Limoges, and Rotild. His elder brother, Guy, was the heir to the viscountcy by marriage to Emma, daughter of Gerald's predecessor, Ademar. Another brother was Geoffrey I, abbot of Saint-Martial de Limoges from 991 to 998. Hildegar was the "product of a family-run church".

Hildegar may have been chosen as bishop by Duke William IV of Aquitaine, but details of his election are not preserved. In the late spring of 977, Hildegar exempted the monastery of Uzerche from lay oversight. In 989, Hildegar attended the epochal Council of Charroux, where the "pax Dei" was first proclaimed. In 990, Hildegar brought some of the treasures of Saint-Martial to Paris. He fell ill and died on the journey, leaving the treasure to the abbey of Saint-Denis. He was succeeded by his younger brother, Hilduin.

== See also ==
- Catholic Church in France

== Sources ==
- Jones, A. T. (2009). Noble Lord, Good Shepherd: Episcopal Power and Piety in Aquitaine, 877–1050. Leiden: Brill.
- Lewis, A. R. (1965). The Development of Southern French and Catalan Society, 718–1050. Austin: University of Texas Press.
