= Council of Charroux =

The Council of Charroux was held on June 1, 989 at Charroux Abbey in Charroux, Vienne, southeast of Poitiers, where relics of the True Cross were preserved. Meeting under the patronage of William IV, Duke of Aquitaine and Count of Poitiers, under the authority of Gombald, Archbishop of Bordeaux and in the presence of the bishops Gislebert of Poitiers, Frotaire (Frotier) of Périgueux, Abbon of Saintes, Hugues I of Jarnac d'Angoulême and Hildegaire of Limoges, it established for the first time the peace of God: its canons anathematized (excommunicated) "the violators of churches", "thieves of the goods of the poor" and "those who brutalize the clergy".

== Context and course ==
The aim was to put an end to private wars between lords, clashes that the weakened Duke William IV (despite his nickname "Fier-à-Bras", translated "brave/formidable arm") was unable to prevent alone, or at least to moderate their extent and effects. It has been said that the bishops and archbishops present at the council held their seat from the duke and that they feared too brutal a destabilization of their position and of the social order after the death of the chorbishop of Limoges.

The council evidently did not institute peace, but it signified to the feudal lords that they no longer had the exclusive right to initiate and act to wage war, and offered a framework establishing for the first time the rules and limits of war. It showed that the authority of the Church could supplement royal or princely authority when the latter proved lacking.

At the Council of Charroux, the protection of churches, their immunity, was reaffirmed: "anathema to him who violates churches: if someone violates a holy church or wants to take something from it by force, let him be anathema - unless he makes reparation". Two of the anathemas of Charroux are devoted to the protection of the poor.

- "Anathema to him who strikes clerics: if someone attacks, captures or strikes a priest, a deacon or another member of the clergy who does not bear arms, then it is sacrilegious - unless the cleric has been judged by his own bishop after being guilty of an offense".

What was new was that this immunity was extended to civilians and their property which must be kept out of the war:

- "Anathema to anyone who takes the property of the poor: if anyone seizes the sheep, oxen, donkeys, cows, goats, billy-goats or pigs of farmers and other poor people, let him be anathema - unless it is because of a fault of the poor person himself, and only if he has done nothing to amend himself".

== Second Council of Charroux ==
A second council was convened at Charroux in 1028 at the initiative of William VI, Duke of Aquitaine to study the means of combating Manichaeism; however, the acts of this council are not preserved.

== Bibliography ==
- Thomas Gergen, Le concile de Charroux et la paix de Dieu: un pas vers l'unification du droit pénal au Moyen Age?, (tr. "The Council of Charroux and the Peace of God: a step towards the unification of criminal law in the Middle Ages?") Société des antiquaires de l'ouest et des musées de Poitiers, 1998, 56 p. (OCLC 912275972).
- Robert Favreau, Le concile de Charroux de 989, 1989, 219 p. (OCLC 495207098)

== See also ==
- Cáin Adomnáin
- Peace and Truce of God / Paix de Dieu /Pax dei
