= Peace and Truce of God =

Massive medieval Catholic-led peace movement

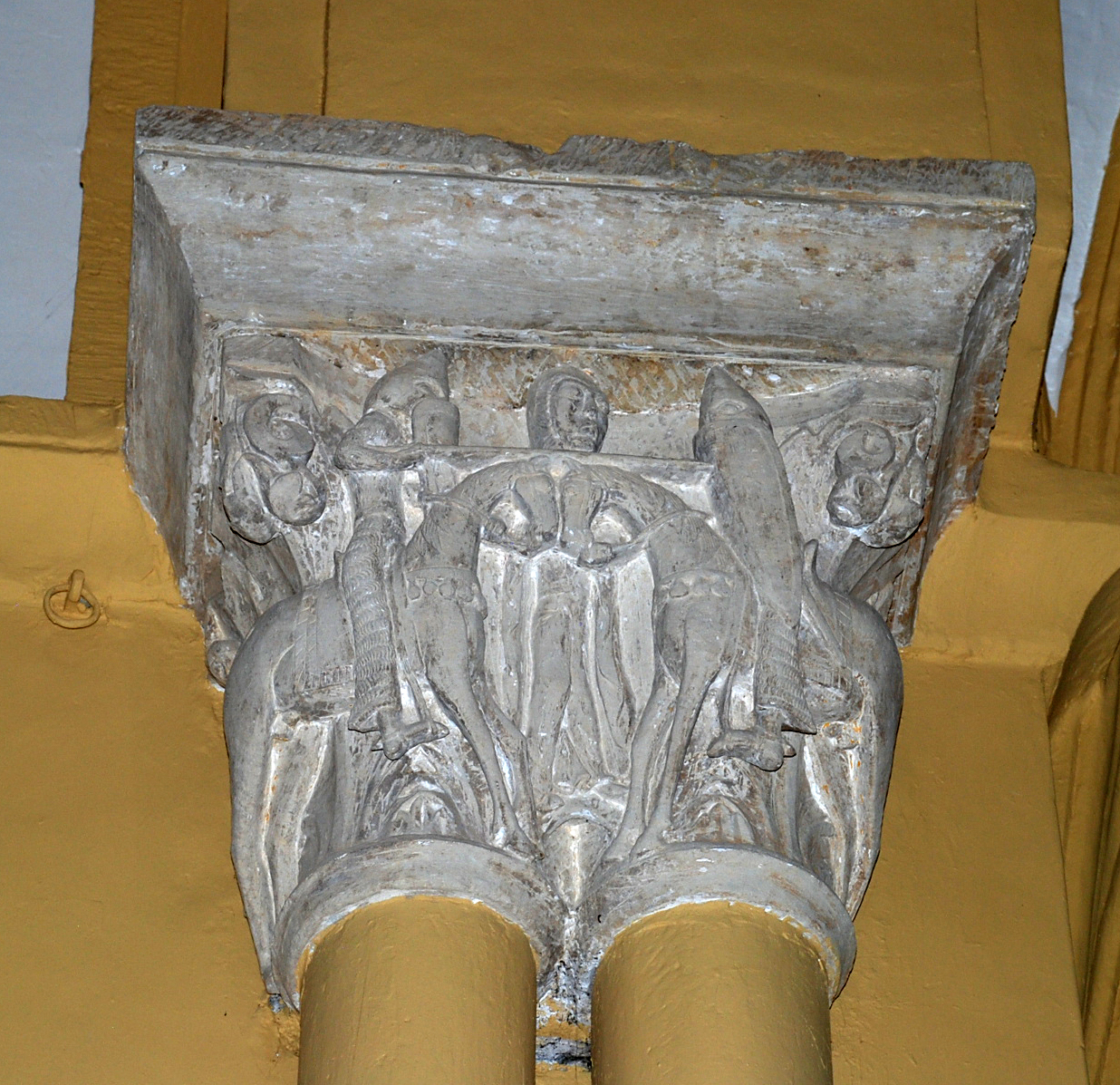
Capital in the church of Revilla de Collazos depicting the Peace and Truce of God: two mounted knights aim to duel, but a woman holds them back by the reins.

The Peace and Truce of God (Latin: Pax et treuga Dei) was a movement in the Middle Ages led by the Catholic Church and was one of the most influential mass peace movements in history. The goal of both the Pax Dei and the Treuga Dei was to limit the violence of feuding in the western half of the former Carolingian Empire – following its collapse in the middle of the 9th century – using the threat of spiritual sanctions. The eastern half of the former Carolingian Empire did not experience the same collapse of central authority, and neither did England. This movement was also marked by popular participation, with many commoners supporting the movement as a solution to the famines, violence, and collapse of the social order around them.

The Peace of God was first proclaimed in 989, at the Council of Charroux. It sought to protect ecclesiastical property, agricultural resources and unarmed clerics. The Truce of God, first proclaimed in 1027 at the Council of Toulouges, attempted to limit the days of the week and times of year that the nobility engaged in violence. The movement persisted in some form until the thirteenth century.

Other strategies to deal with the problem of violence in the western half of the former Carolingian Empire included the code of chivalry.

== Background ==
Christian laws regarding violence had evolved from the earlier concept of Pax Romana.

There was an ecclesiastical discussion of peace for secular authorities as early as 494, in a letter from Pope Gelasius I to Emperor Anastasius, in which he suggested that kings listen to religious authorities before making their judgments. As early as 697, Adomnán of Iona promulgated the Cáin Adomnáin, which provided sanctions against the killing of children, clerics, clerical students and peasants on clerical lands.

Other ecclesiastical measures to protect church property were also observed from the tenth to the eleventh centuries, as evidenced by the Council of Trosly, which explicitly designated the destruction of church property as sacrilege. The controversy flourished in the eleventh century, when secular violence from private wars and personal feuds began to threaten both church buildings and monastic communities throughout Europe.

== History ==
The Peace of God was first proclaimed in 989 at the Council of Charroux. It sought to protect ecclesiastical property, agricultural resources, and unarmed clerics. After the collapse of the Carolingian Empire in the ninth century, the areas formerly under its control degenerated into many small counties and lordships, in which local lords and knights frequently fought each other for control. The West Frankish nobility benefited from the Carolingian accession and introduced the Capetian, further transforming medieval European society. One of the critical points of this dynastic change is what Guy Bois calls "the mutation of the year 1000," the period being known for its relentless combination of chaos and creativity. Frederick S. Paxton argues that the political and cultural landscape of this period highlights some of the prevailing cultural anxieties and problems around the turn of the millennium, particularly the "unprecedented disorder in governmental, legal, and social institutions." Carolingian society faced a "king incapable of action and a nobility unwilling to act, which led the French people, imbued with a 'national spirit' that was particularly creative in combating political and social ills, to turn to spiritual sanctions as the only available means of limiting violence."

While some historians postulate that the Peace of God and Truce of God movements stem from the inability or unwillingness of the highest echelons of Carolingian society to contain the violence and feuds among the Capetian nobles, other scholars argue that a castellan revolution in the Frankish kingdoms contributed to the problem. According to André Debord, the Peace and Truce movement arose in response to the social and political upheavals resulting from the rapid growth of castle building in the early eleventh century, particularly in Aquitaine. The chaos of the era is attributed to the problem of violent feuds, with castellans and their militias working toward consolidated power and freedom from the overarching political structure of the Carolingian Empire.

By 1030, at the same time that William V, Duke of Aquitaine, William IV of Provence, and Ademar of Chabannes died, county power was overwhelming in Charente. During this period, the county power of dukes and counts was changing, for the building of castles was an inherent consolidation of power. At the same time, "those who possessed county castles had a marked tendency to disobey as soon as the count or duke turned his back on them," so that figures who possessed little traditional power, such as Hugh the Chiliarc, "could cause the most serious trouble to the distinguished duke of Aquitaine."

There were often attacks from the Vikings in this period, who settled in northern areas (the Normans) but continued to raid territory further inland.

The two movements began at different times and places, but by the eleventh century they became synonymous as "Peace and Truce of God". The Germans looked on French 'anarchy' with a mixture of horror and contempt. To preserve the king's peace was the first duty of a German sovereign." The movement, though seemingly redundant to the duties of the crown, had a religious momentum that would not be denied. Holy Roman Emperor Henry III issued the earliest form of this in his empire while at Constance in 1043. Some scholars connect it to the subsequent concept of Landfriede in the Holy Roman Empire, although others suggest Landfriede existed alongside or prior to these movements.

== Peace of God ==
The Peace of God or Pax Dei was a proclamation of the local clergy that granted immunity from violence to noncombatants who could not defend themselves, starting with the peasants (agricolae) and the clergy. The Synod of Charroux decreed a limited Pax Dei in 989, and the practice spread to most of Western Europe over the next century, surviving in some form until at least the thirteenth century.

Under the Peace of God are included:

- consecrated persons — clerics, monks, virgins, and cloistered widows;
- consecrated places — churches, monasteries, and cemeteries, with their dependencies;
- consecrated times — Sundays, and ferial days, all under the special protection of the Church, which punishes transgressors with excommunication.

At an early date the councils extended the Peace of God to the Church's protégés, the poor, pilgrims, crusaders, and even merchants on a journey. The peace of the sanctuary gave rise to the right of asylum.

=== Popular Participation ===
At the Benedictine abbey of Charroux in La Marche on the borders of the Aquitaine "a great crowd of many people (populus) gathered there from the Poitou, the Limousin, and neighbouring regions. Many bodies of saints were also brought there "bringing miracles in their wake". Three canons promulgated at Charroux, under the leadership of Gombald Archbishop of Bordeaux and Gascony, were signed by the bishops of Poitiers, Limoges, Périgueux, Saintes and Angoulême, all in the west of France beyond the limited jurisdiction of King Hugh Capet. Excommunication would be the punishment for attacking or robbing a church, for robbing peasants or the poor of farm animals – among which the donkey is mentioned, but not the horse (an item beyond the reach of a peasant) – and for robbing, striking or seizing a priest or any man of the clergy "who is not bearing arms". Making compensation or reparations could circumvent the anathema of the Church.

Children and women (virgins and widows) were added to the early protections. The Pax Dei prohibited nobles from invading churches, from beating the defenceless, from burning houses, and so on. A synod of 1033 added merchants and their goods to the protected list. Significantly, the Peace of God movement began in Aquitaine, Burgundy and Languedoc, areas where central authority had most completely fragmented.

The participation of large, enthusiastic crowds marked the phenomenon of Pax Dei as one of the first popular religious movements of the Middle Ages. In the initial phase, the mixture of relics, crowds and enthusiasm characterized the movement with an exceptionally popular character.

After a lull in the first two decades of the eleventh century, the movement spread to the north of France with the support of king Robert II of France (reigned 996–1031). There, the high nobility sponsored Peace assemblies throughout Flanders, Burgundy, Champagne, the Amiénois, and Berry. The oaths to keep the peace sworn by nobles spread in time to the villagers themselves; heads of households meeting communally would ritually swear to uphold the common peace.

The tenth-century foundation of the Cluny Abbey in Burgundy aided the development of the Peace of God. Cluny was independent of any secular authority, subject to the Papacy alone, and while all church territory was inviolate, Cluny's territory extended far beyond its own boundaries. A piece of land 30 km in diameter was considered to be part of Cluny itself, and any smaller monastery that allied itself with Cluny was granted the same protection from violence. A Peace of God council gave this grant in Anse in 994. The monastery was also immune from excommunications, interdicts, and anathemas, which would normally affect an entire region. Fleury Abbey was granted similar protection. Many Cluniac monks came from the same knightly class whose violence they were trying to stop.

The movement was not very effective. However it set a precedent that would be followed by other successful popular movements to control nobles' violence such as medieval communes.

The phrase "Peace of God" also occurs as a general term meaning "under the protection of the Church" and was used in various contexts in medieval society. Pilgrims traveling on crusades, for example, did so under the "peace of God," that is, under the protection of the Church. This general use of the term does not always refer to the "Peace and Truce of God" movement.

Georges Duby summarised the widening social repercussions of Pax Dei:

The Peace and Truce of God, by attaching sacred significance to privacy, helped create a space in which communal gatherings could take place and thus encouraged the reconstitution of public space at the village level ... In the eleventh and twelfth centuries many a village grew up in the shadow of the church, in the zone of immunity where violence was prohibited under peace regulations.

==== The Limousin Peace of God ====
A subset of the movement is known as the Limousin Peace of God (994–1032/3). The most important source documenting the Limousin movement is the contemporary writer Ademar of Chabannes (989–1034). Ademar is a monk of Saint-Eparchius of Angoulême, who spent time at Saint-Martial in Limoges and was a historian, liturgist, grammarian, and artist. The Limousin Peace of God movement is generally regarded as largely fictitious, for Ademar seems to have created a fiction about the actual development of the Peace of God in Aquitaine. One of the points that Richard Landes and other historians have established is that there was a Peace of God movement in Aquitaine, as Rodulphus Glaber, writing about the peace councils in Francia in 1033, stated that the movement began in Aquitaine.

One of the most important points in Landes' historiographical study of the early councils of Limoges is the fact that ecclesiastical authorities encouraged cultural and religious enthusiasm within council activities in the late tenth and early eleventh centuries. Landes, known for his work on apocalyptic currents of thought around the year 1000, argues that conciliar activities in Limoges and other areas of Aquitaine are crucial to understanding the role of the God's Peace movement as a whole because of the combination of apocalyptic attitudes toward the end of the tenth century and the popularity of penitential practices for natural and man-made disasters. In the case of Limoges, there was a major outbreak of a "'plague of plagues,' probably ergotism" and "the abbot and the bishop (brothers of the viscount), in consultation with the duke of Aquitaine, called for a three-day fast, during which relics from all over the world would come to Limoges."

==== The Cult of Saints and the Importance of Relics ====
In general, one of the reasons for the large popular participation in the Peace of God movement throughout Europe was the popularity of relics and the penitential practices associated with the cult of saints. In the case of Limoges, the cult of Saint Martial is prominent, as miracles were attested to his shrine during the Peace Council of 994. The narrative from the Vita prolixior s. Martialis is directly related to the ideals of peace:

Mass conversions to a gospel of peace ensue, including the ruler and his soldiers, who accept an ethic of restraint and express their collective penitence with great emotion. This process of projection radically transforms Valeria's pagan fiancé Stephen from a local nobleman's son into the powerful duke of the Gauls, a mirror image of William V (993–1030), with his pilgrimage to Rome, his devotion to Martial, his love of the church and of peace. Elsewhere Martial exorcises Exodus, the demon leader of a diabolic band, so named because he loved strife and dissension – the very personification of that bellicose temperament so rampant among the warrior class, the great enemy of the Peace of God.

Relics and the cults of saints were also important in the Peace of God movement in Hainaut. During the rebellion of Godfrey III against Holy Roman Emperor Henry III (1047–56), Lobbes Abbey was ravaged and had to be rebuilt, so the abbot decided to take the relics of the abbey's founder, Saint Ursmar, on a tour (delatio) through Flanders, starting in 1060, in order to convince Count Baldwin V to restore the abbey's Flemish estates (and possibly to collect gifts from the faithful along the way). Performing many supposed miracles along the way, and ending feuds between many different types of people, this tour helped Pope Urban II's declaration of the Truce of God in 1095 become implemented in Flanders and its surrounding area more quickly.

==== Normandy ====
In the Duchy of Normandy it was initially decided that the peace was unnecessary due to the good order guaranteed by the Duke.

After the Battle of Val-ès-Dunes in 1047, there was still strong opposition to William among the Norman nobles, but they were forced to declare a Truce of God at a church council. in Caen in October. This truce, backed by the full endorsement of the Church, stated that private wars or vendettas were prohibited from Wednesday evening to Monday morning. The truce exempted the Duke of Normandy and the King of France. This attempt was unsuccessful.

== Truce of God ==
The Truce of God or Tregua Dei had its origin in the eleventh century. Proclaimed in 1027 at the Council of Toulouges, the bishops attempted to limit the days of the week and times of year that the nobility engaged in violence.

While the Truce of God is a temporary suspension of hostilities, as opposed to the Peace of God, the scope of the truce of God is broader. The Truce of God prohibited fighting on Sundays and Feria (feast days when people did not have to work). It was the sanctification of Sunday that led to the Truce of God, because it had always been agreed not to fight on that day and to suspend disputes in the courts.

It confirmed permanent peace for all churches and their grounds, the monks, clerks and chattels; all women, pilgrims, merchants and their servants, cattle and horses; and men at work in the fields. For all others peace was required throughout Advent, the season of Lent, and from the beginning of the Rogation days until eight days after Pentecost. This prohibition was later extended to certain days of the week, namely Thursday, commemorating the Ascension, Friday, the day of the Passion, and Saturday, the day of the Resurrection (Council 1041). In the middle of the twelfth century, the number of days prescribed was extended until there were about eighty days left for fighting.

The Truce soon spread from France to Italy and Germany; the 1179 Third Council of the Lateran extended the institution to the whole Church by Canon xxi, "De treugis servandis", which was inserted in the collection of canon law, Decretal of Gregory IX, I, tit., "De treuga et pace". Aquinas challenged the Truce, holding that it was lawful to wage war to safeguard the commonwealth on holy days and feast days.

== Peace of God and Truce of God and chivalry and crusades ==
One of the interesting developments that began at the end of the tenth century and continued well into the eleventh century is the rhetoric of God's Peace and God's Peace movements within chivalric vows and as a way to divert chivalric violence from one's country. While the God's Peace and God's Peace movements must be considered as developing separately in Europe, in terms of the role of these movements in war and in civil society, there are instances where the rhetoric of the movements is combined in oaths and speeches by both secular and ecclesiastical leaders, such as the secular leader Robert the Pious (Robert II, King of the Franks 996-1031).

The oath is important because it shows that the secular powers are now willing to obey the ecclesiastical powers and rein in problematic knights and armies. Furthermore, chivalric and warlike violence is often undermined by the ecclesiastical powers through the use of crusades. For Pope Urban II at the Council of Clermont in 1095, subverting martial violence is an effective means against secular violence:

Oh race of the Franks, we learn that in some of your provinces no one can venture on the road by day or by night without injury or attack by highwaymen, and no one is secure even at home. Let us then re-enact the law of our ancestors known as the Truce of God. And now that you have promised to maintain the peace among yourselves you are obligated to succour your brethren in the East, menaced by an accursed race, utterly alienated from God. The Holy Sepulchre of our Lord is polluted by the filthiness of an unclean nation. Recall the greatness of Charlemagne. O most valiant soldiers, descendants of invincible ancestors, be not degenerate. Let all hatred depart from among you, all quarrels end, all wars cease. Start upon the road to the Holy Sepulchre to wrest that land from the wicked race and subject it to yourselves.

The Peace of God and the Truce of God thus moved in the rhetorical landscape of subverting violence by redirecting it to more appropriate areas, such as a crusade in the Middle East against Islam to recapture Jerusalem.

== Other developments ==
From the 11th century on, knighthood developed a religious character. Aspiring knights underwent strict religious rituals to be initiated. An initiate had to fast, confess his sins, take a symbolic bath, have his hair cut to represent humility, and spend a night in prayer while his weapons lay on an altar symbolizing the dedication of his arms to the Church and God. Advances in metallurgy made it possible to engrave inscriptions and images of sacred symbols on helmets, swords, shields, the saddle and bridle of a horse. Relics and items with religious symbols, often of saints, were routinely carried into battle by knights in the Middle Ages. The symbols reminded the knights and soldiers that God supported their efforts and offered the soldiers protection and the assurance of victory over their enemies.

In addition to the Peace and Truce of God movement, the clergy used other nonviolent, though less direct, methods of controlling violence. By adding the religious oath of fealty to the feudal act of homage and by organizing rights and duties within the system, churchmen did their utmost to civilize feudal society in general and to set limits on feudal violence in particular.

Louis IX of France was famous for his attention to settling disputes and keeping the peace, at least within the Kingdom of France. He issued the first surviving decree prohibiting warfare in France indefinitely. This text, dated January 1258, forbade guerre omnes as well as arson and disturbance of wagons and agricolae working with wagons or plows. Those who violated this prohibition were to be punished as peacebreakers (fractores pacis) by the king's officer and the elected bishop of le Puy-en-Velay. Louis IX promulgated this text as a simple royal act based on his authority as king.

The Bianchi were a religious movement that swept through Italy for several months in 1399. Tens of thousands of men, women, and children crisscrossed the country praying and advocating for peace. It was a shock to many observers, and the authorities were unprepared. It also brought peace, at least for a few months, to much of Italy.

== See also ==
- Catholic peace traditions
- Cluniac Reforms
- Landfrieden
- Religion and peacebuilding
- Cáin Adomnáin
- Peace Testimony
- "I am a Catalan", a 1971 speech by Pau Casals praising the Peace and Truce of God.
- Olympic Truce, truce promoted during the Olympic Games
- Peace (law)

== Bibliography ==
- Bainton, Roland H. (1960). Christian attitudes towards war and peace : a historical survey and critical re-evaluation. New York: Abingdon Press. OCLC 963644630.
- Daileader, Philip (2001). "3. Those who fought". The High Middle Ages. Chantilly, VA: Teaching Co.
- Debord, André (1992). "The Castellan Revolution and the Peace of God.". The Peace of God: Social Violence and Religious Response in France around the Year 1000. Ithaca: Cornell University Press. pp. 135–164.
- Duby, Georges (1988). Mâle Moyen Âge: de l'amour et autres essais [Masculine Middle Ages: On Love and Other Essays] (in French). Paris: Flammarion. ISBN 9782082111799.
- Duby, Georges; Ariès, Phillippe (1993). A History of Private Life: Revelations of the Medieval World. Belknap Press of Harvard University Press. ISBN 978-0674400016.
- Gress, David (1985). Peace and Survival: West Germany, The Peace Movement & European Security. Hoover Press. ISBN 978-0-8179-8093-1.
- Head, Thomas (1999). "The Development of the Peace of God in Aquitaine (970-1005)". Speculum. 74 (3): 656–686. doi:10.2307/2886764. ISSN 0038-7134. JSTOR 2886764.
- Head, Thomas F.; Landes, Richard Allen (1992). The Peace of God: Social Violence and Religious Response in France Around the Year 1000. Cornell University Press. ISBN 0-8014-8021-3.
- Landes, Richard (1992). "Between Aristocracy and Heresy: Popular Participation in the Limousin Peace of God". The Peace of God: Social Violence and Religious Response in France around the Year 1000. Ithaca: Cornell University Press. pp. 184–218.
- Morris, Marc (2012). The Norman Conquest: The Battle of Hastings and the Fall of Anglo-Saxon England'. ISBN 978-1-4481-3602-5.
- Paxton, Frederick S. (1992). "History, Historians, and the Peace of God". The Peace of God: Social Violence and Religious Response in France around the Year 1000. Ithaca: Cornell University Press. pp. 21–40.
