= Benedict of Chiusa =

11th-century Italian scholar and monk

Benedict of Chiusa was a travelling Lombard scholar-monk of the 11th century. He is known chiefly from his memorable appearance in the Historia Francorum of Adémar de Chabannes.

Adémar describes a speech made by Benedict at a council of the bishops of Aquitaine in 1028. In it, Benedict describes himself as the nephew and designated successor of the abbot of San Michele della Chiusa.

In subsequent debate, Benedict challenged Adémar's promotion of Saint Martial and the willingness of the saint's adherents in Aquitaine to believe that he had been one of the original apostles. Adémar's reputation was temporarily damaged as a result.
