= Abbey of Saint-Cybard =

Benedictine abbey in France

Coordinates: 45.653°N 0.150°E

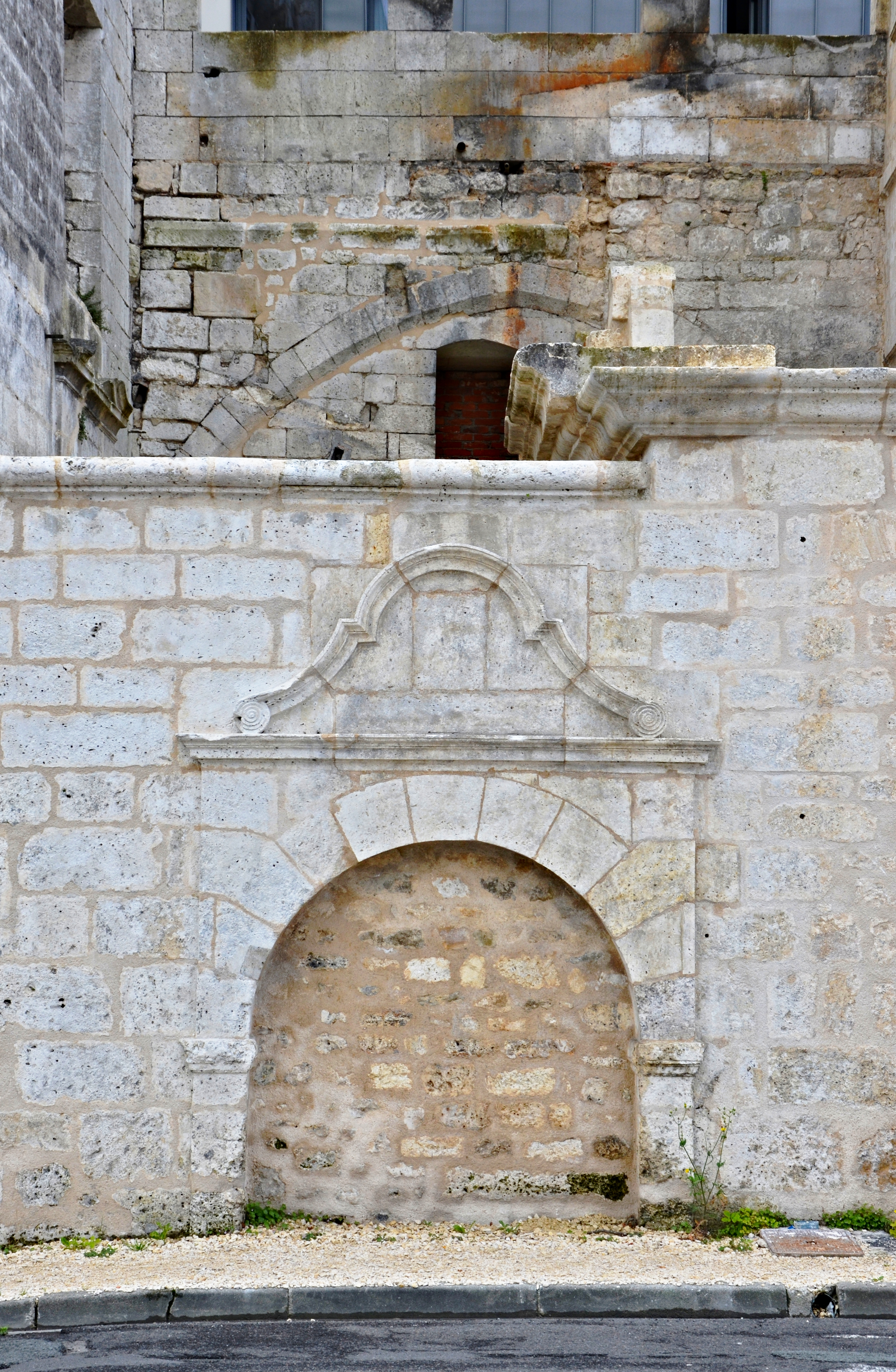
Former entrance of the abbot's lodgings

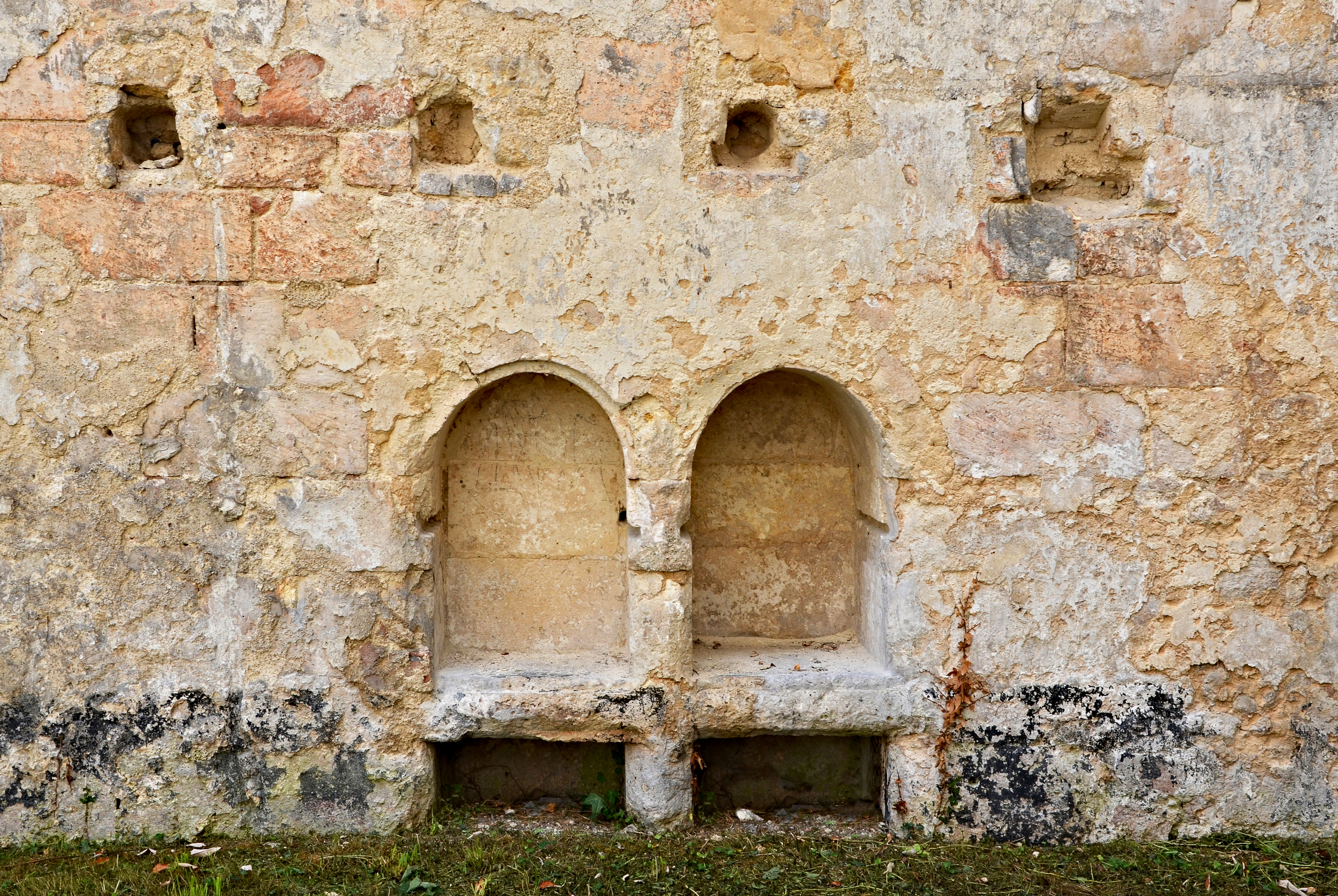
Recesses and holes for timber in the remains of the refectory walls

The Abbey of Saint-Cybard was a Benedictine monastery located just outside the northern city walls of Angoulême.

According to Gregory of Tours in the Historia Francorum (VI, 8), the monastery was founded by Saint Eparchius in the sixth century. Little is known about the institution after its founding until 852, when King Charles the Bald confirmed a series of gifts to the abbey made by Abbot Launus, who was also the bishop of Angoulême.

The Abbey suffered along with other monasteries and cities of the region during the Viking raids of the ninth century, being sacked in 875. It adopted the Benedictine rule in 938. Between 1075 and 1087 Count Fulk of Angoulême handed Saint-Cybard over to the Cluniac abbey of Saint-Jean-d'Angély. While Saint-Jean's abbot was to appoint the abbot of Saint-Cybard, it was not until 1098 or 1099 when the monks of Saint-Cybard were forced to accept the arrangement. This relationship ended in 1161.

In 1568, during the Wars of Religion, Protestants seized Angoulême and destroyed the monastery. There now remains only the north side of the abbey church along with sections of the chapels located in the northwest corner of what was once the cloister.

== Sources ==
- Adémar de Chabannes. Ademari Cabannensis Chronicon. Corpus Christianorum Continuatio Mediaevalis CXXIX. Edited by Pascale Bourgain, Richard Landes and Georges Pon. Turnhout: Brepols, 1999.
- Giry, Arthur, Maurice Prou, Ferdinand Lot, and Georges Tessier. Recueil des actes de Charles II le Chauve, roi de France. Paris: Imprimerie nationale, 1943–1955.
- Gregorii episcopi Turonensis. "Libri Historiarum X." Monumenta Germaniae Historica SRM 1:1. Edited by Bruno Krusch and Wilhelm Levison. Hannover: Impensis Bibliopolii Hahniani, 1951.
- Lefrancq, Paul, ed. Cartulaire de l’abbaye de Saint-Cybard. Angoulême: Imprimerie Ouvrière, 1930.
- Lewis, Archibald R. (1965). The Development of Southern French and Catalan Society, 718–1050. University of Texas Press.
- Musset, Georges, ed. "Cartulaire de Saint-Jean-d’Angély." Archives historiques de la Saintonge et de l’Aunis 30 and 33 (1901 and 1903).
- Nanglard, Jean, ed. Cartulaire de l’église d’Angoulême. Angoulême, 1900.
