= Chronicon Aquitanicum =

The Chronicon Aquitanicum is a set of annals covering the years 830 to 930 with several gaps and an added notice on the year 1025. It is found in the "great encyclopedia codex", BN lat. 5239, of the Abbey of Saint Martial at Limoges. Its entries are annotations on an Easter cycle.

The Chronicon was first published by Philippe Labbe in 1653. It was next published in 1717 by Edmond Martène and Ursin Durand under the title Breve chronicon Normannicum sive Britannicum ("Short Chronicle of the Northmen, or Britons"). Georg Pertz edited it for a third time for the Monumenta Germaniae Historica in 1829, using the title by which it is most commonly known.

The Chronicon draws on the Annales Engolismenses for much of its information. Both sets of annals were used by Adhemar of Chabannes in composing his Historiae. In 1025, while copying from BN lat. 5239, he added marginal notes of his own to the codex. He returned to Limoges in 1026/7 to add a notice for the year 1025 to the Chronicon, recording the deaths of Emperors Henry II (who actually died in 1024) and Basil II. His notice appears right beneath another already added by another scribe, recording the death of the Viscount Guy of Limoges on 27 October of that year and his burial at Saint Martial's. The notice for 1025 is the only one added after the annals were compiled late in the tenth century. The "false precision" of Adhemar's annal—Henry did not die in the same twelve-month period as Basil, nor did Conrad immediately succeed him—indicates a "sense of global drama and continuity" characteristic of the "excited optimism that reigned at Limoges".

== Sources ==
- Landes, Richard Allen. Relics, Apocalypse, and the Deceits of History: Ademar of Chabannes, 989–1034. Harvard University Press, 1995.
