= Hildegar (bishop of Beauvais) =

Hildegar (died c. 972) was the bishop of Beauvais from 933 until his death. He signed documents variously Hildegarius, Hildierus or Hildricus.

Hildegar was part of the delegation that met Louis IV at Boulogne when the future king returned from his English exile. He accompanied the king to Laon, where he was crowned. In 940 he took part in the synod that deposed Archbishop Artald of Reims and re-instated the previously deposed Archbishop Hugh. According to Richer of Reims, Hildegar, along with Rodulf of Laon and Guy I of Soissons, sent a letter to the Holy See defending the re-instatement of Hugh.

In 944 Hildegar and Guy of Soissons were sent as hostages to Harald, the Viking lord of Bayeux, in exchange for the freedom of King Louis, who had been captured in battle. In 946 Hildegar participated in the council that re-instated Artald, but he continued to assist Hugh in consecrating a new bishop of Amiens, for which the council condemned him in 948.

Hildegar was buried in the abbey of Saint-Lucien, where his tomb was found in 1815.

== Sources ==
- Delettre, Charles (1842). Histoire du Diocèse de Beauvais depuis son établissement au 3^{me} siècle jusqu'au 2 september 1792. Beauvais: Desjardins.
- Saint-Quentin, Dudo of (1998). Christiansen, Eric (ed.). History of the Normans. Translated by Christiansen, Eric. Woodbridge: Boydell Press. ISBN 978-0-85115-552-4.
- Saint-Rémi, Richer of (2011). Lake, Justin (ed.). Histories, Volume 1, Books 1 and 2: Richer of Saint-Rémi. Translated by Lake, Justin. Cambridge, MA: Harvard UP. p. xxi. ISBN 9780674060036.
