= Charroux Abbey =

Ruined abbey in Charroux, France

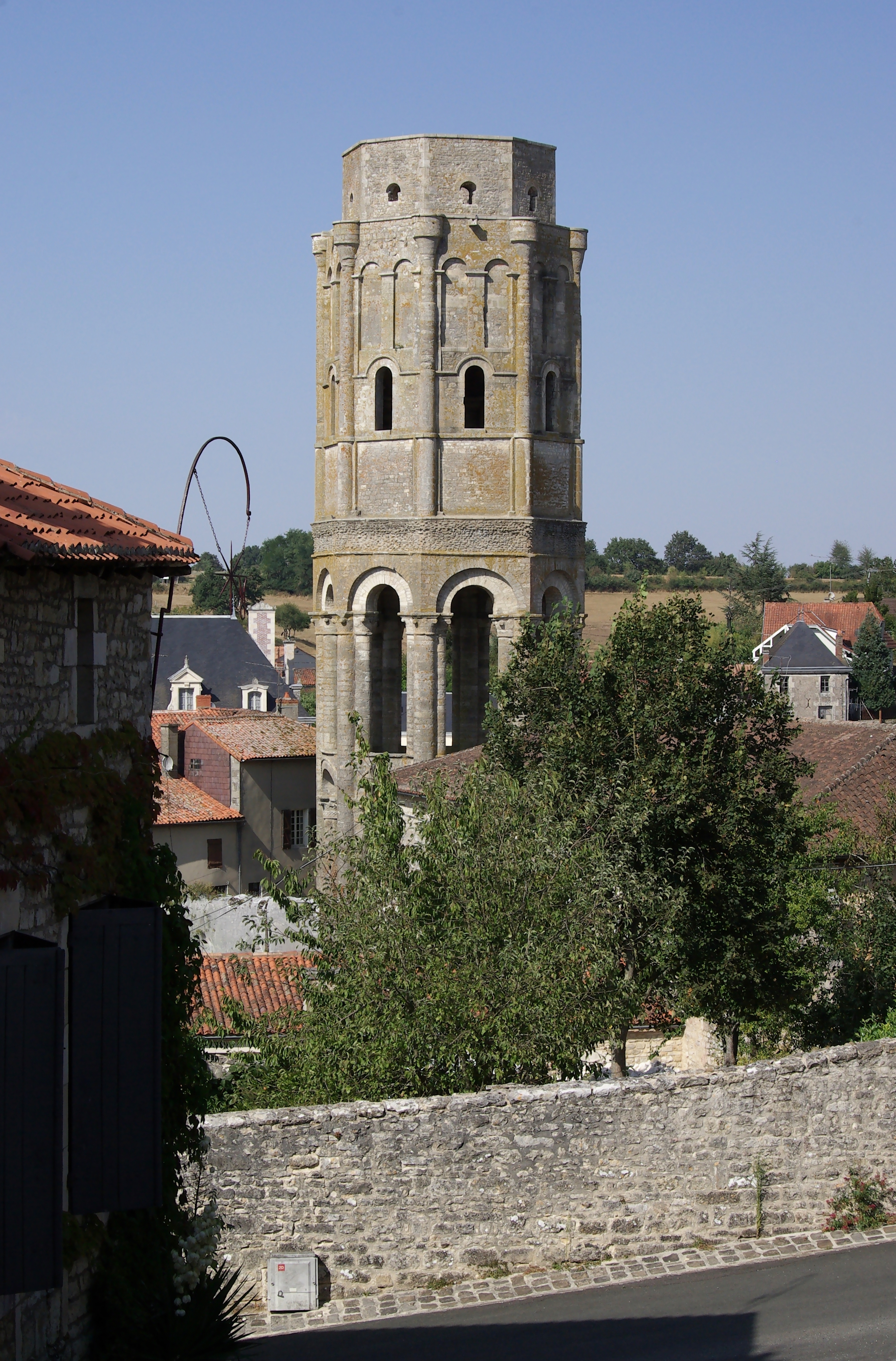
- Charlemagne tower seen from the church
- Interactive map of Charroux Abbey

Monastery information
- Full name: Abbaye Saint-Sauveur de Charroux
- Order: Benedictine
- Established: 785
- Disestablished: 1762
- Dedication: Sanctus Salvator
- Diocese: Poitiers

People
- Founders: Roger, Count of Limoges

Site
- Location: Charroux, Vienne, France
- Coordinates: 46°8′36.3″N 0°24′15.9″E
- Visible remains: Charlemagne Tower, Chapter house
- Public access: Yes
- Website: https://www.abbaye-charroux.fr/

Charroux Abbey (French: Abbaye Saint-Sauveur de Charroux) is a ruined monastery in Charroux, in the Vienne department of Nouvelle-Aquitaine, western France.

== History ==
Charroux was a Benedictine abbey, founded in 785 by Roger, Count of Limoges. It had up to 213 affiliated abbeys and priories. The Council of Charroux was held at the abbey in 989. Under the patronage of William IV, Duke of Aquitaine, the assembly of clergy founded the Pax Dei, or Peace of God. This agreement granted immunity from violence to noncombatants who could not defend themselves, beginning with the peasants and the clergy. Excommunication was established as the punishment for attacking or robbing a church, for robbing peasants or the poor of farm animals, and for robbing, striking or seizing a priest or clergyman who was not bearing arms.

The abbey was said to have possessed the Holy Prepuce, the foreskin of Jesus, which was allegedly given to the monks by Charlemagne, King of the Franks from 768 to 814. The relic was displayed to members of a council at Charroux in 1082. At some point, however, the relic went missing.

The original abbey church was destroyed in 989. In the early eleventh century, the Count of Poitou asked the monks of Saint-Sernin in Poitou to rebuild the church and institute reforms for the monks. The abbey church was rebuilt in the 11th century, and was "one of the most distinguished houses in Southern France". The new church was dedicated in 1096 by Pope Urban II.

The abbey was burned in 1422, during the Hundred Years War, and was plundered three times during the Wars of Religion, in 1562, 1569 and 1587.

In 1762 the abbey was abandoned. Following the French Revolution, the buildings, already in ruins, were sold for the national good in 1790. It was sold in five sections, and the buildings partly demolished to form a racecourse. However, the owner of the Charlemagne Tower resisted pressure to demolish the structure. Charles de Cherge and Prosper Mérimée intervened to save the remains of the monument, and the sculptures on the gate were purchased by the French state. The remains were classified as monuments historique in 1945 and 1950. Today, the remains are in the care of the Centre des monuments nationaux, and are open to the public.

== Architecture ==
=== Abbey church ===
The only remaining structure of the church is the 11th-century lantern tower, known as the Charlemagne Tower. It formed the central rotunda of the abbey. Overall, the church was 126 metres (413 ft) long, although the site of the nave was built over in the 19th century.

=== Monastic buildings ===
Some of the monastic buildings survive, to the south of the abbey church. The chapter house was an extension of the south transept, and was built in the 13th century. In the 15th century by the abbot Jean Chaperon, including a flamboyant Gothic doorway which connected with the church. Three Gothic gateways were built in front of the Romanesque church facade in the 13th century. 27 sculptures of kings and abbots, and several parts of the gates, were preserved following the demolition of the church, and they represent the height of Gothic sculpture in the Poitou region. The sculptures are displayed in the chapter house.

== Abbots of Charroux ==
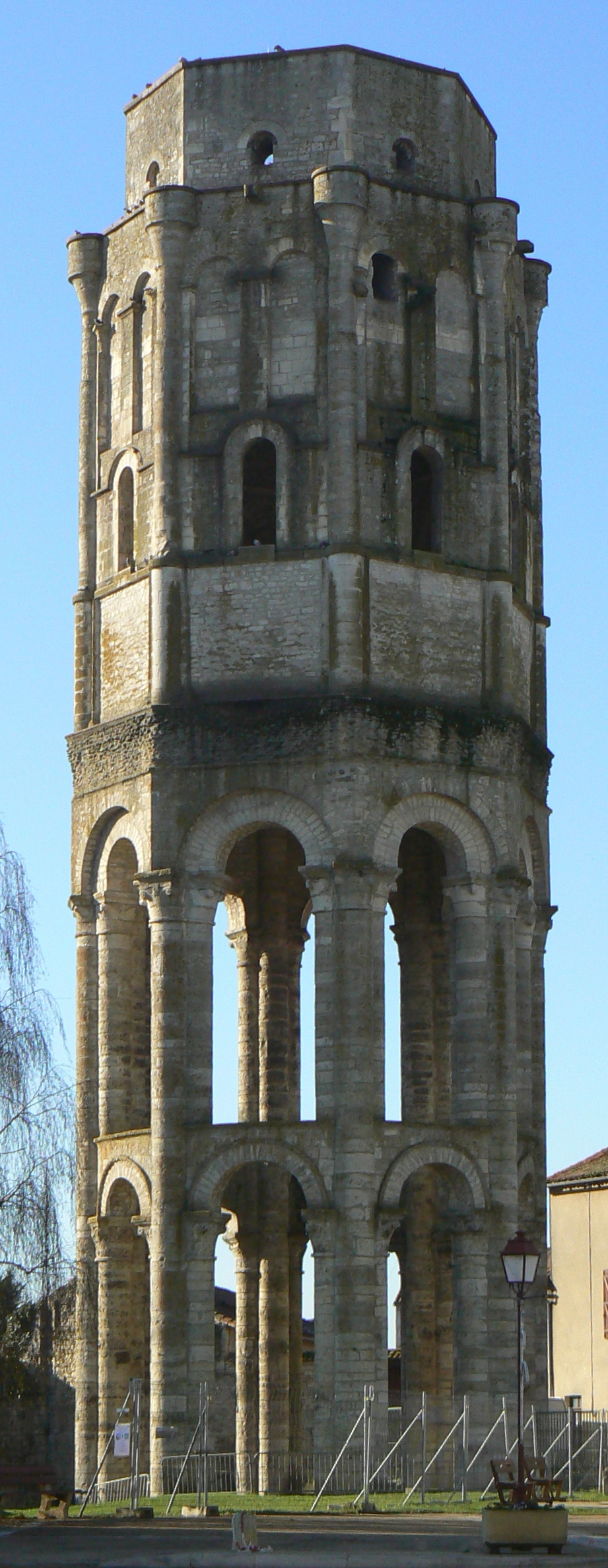
Charlemagne Tower

This is an incomplete list of abbots and commendators of Charroux.

- Dominique (783– )
- David (799– )
- Justus (817– )
- Gombaud I (Guntbaldus) (830–832)
- Walefredus (c.840–861)
- Guillaume I (862–869)
- Frotaire (869–874), also Archbishop of Bordeaux and Bourges
- Grimpharius (or Grinferius) (874–879)
- Alboin ( –937), later Bishop of Poitiers
- Adalbald
- Pierre I ( –1013), expelled for simony by William, Duke of Aquitaine
- Gombaud II (1013–1017)
- Hugues I (1017)
- Geoffroy I (1017–1018)
- Rainald (or Réginald)
- Foucher (1028–1040)
- Hugues II (1050–1061)
- Fulcrade (1077–1092)
- Pierre II (1092– )
- Foulques (1113–1148)
- Petrus Charboneau (1130)
- Jourdain I (1155– )
- Guillaume II (1180–1187)
- Geoffroy II ( –1195)
- Guillaume III ( –1203)
- Hugues III (1208–1210)
- Jourdain II ( –1217)
- Emeric (1217–1220)
- Jourdain III ( –1234)
- Aymeri (1261–1266)
- Guillaume IV (1269– )
- Pierre III (1279–1282)
- Gui de Baussay
- Raimond de Châteauneuf (1295–1308)
- Pierre IV Bertaud ( –1340)
- Mathieu ( –1358), later Bishop of Aire
- Pierre V Plotte 1372
- Gerald Jauviond ( –1393)
- Bertrand (1398)
- Adhémar (1399 – January 24, 1427)
- Hugues Blanchard (January 1427 – )
- Guillaume IV Robert (1436–1444)
- Jean I Chaperon (1444–1474)
- Louis I Fresneau (1474–1504)
- Geoffroy III de Cluys de Briantes (1504–1521)

=== Commendators ===
- Pierre VI Chateigner of Rocheposay (1521–1543)
- Lazare de Baïf (1543–1547)
- Rene de Daillon of Lude (1547–1567), later bishop of Bayeux, commander of the Order of the Holy Spirit, and adviser to Henri IV
- Pantaléon of Rochejaubert (resigned 1588)
- François of Rochejaubert (c.1588–1614)
- Jean II of Rochejaubert (1614–1635)
- Armand Jean du Plessis, Cardinal Richelieu (commendator until his death on 4 December 1642), also chief advisor to Louis XIII
- Richard Smith (resigned 1648), an Englishman, Vicar Apostolic of England and titular Bishop of Chalcedon
- Jules, Cardinal Mazarin (1648–1650), chief minister to Louis XIV, resigned
- Louis II Maurice de la Trémoille, Count of Laval (1651–1681)
- Frederic-Guillaume de la Trémoille, Prince of Talmont (March 21, 1681 – 1689)
- Charles Frotier de Messelière (April 9, 1689 – 1708)
- François de Crussol d' Uzès d' Amboise (July 30, 1727 – † May 30, 1758), also Bishop of Blois and Archbishop of Toulouse
- N. de Montmorillon (1758– )

== See also ==
- High medieval domes
