= Louis Saltet =

Louis Saltet (1870 – 1952) was a French Benedictine ecclesiastical historian. He taught at Catholic University of Toulouse, and published a long series of articles in the Bulletin de Littérature ecclésiastique de l'Institut Catholique de Toulouse.

He spectacularly exposed forgeries made by Adémar de Chabannes in the eleventh century. This work by Saltet was completed by 1930, but its wide acceptance was delayed by a generation or even two. Confirmation as a technical historical matter is treated in Richard Landes, Relics, Apocalypse, and the Deceits of History: Ademar of Chabannes, 989-1034 (Harvard Historical Studies, 1998).
