= Hildegar of Chartres =

Hildegar of Chartres was a physician and mathematician of the school of Chartres. A favourite student of Bishop Fulbert of Chartres, he eventually became acting treasurer of the church of Poitiers from 1024 to 1026. According to Adelman, another pupil of Fulbert's, Hildegar imitated his teacher's mannerisms and speech. When Hildegar was appointed treasurer of Poitiers, Fulbert wrote to congratulate him and give him advice.

Hildegar was a subdeacon at Chartres Cathedral in 1022, when he wrote a letter requesting a horse to his friend Siefried, to whom he had shown hospitality during the latter's stay in Chartres. He told Siefried that friendship was "not only for its own sake but also for usefulness" (non propter se tantum sed et propter utilitatem). He collected his correspondence with Fulbert, in which he writes as a friend and the latter responds with friendly advice on his duties as treasurer. Hildegar even admits to missing the presence of Fulbert's secretary, Sigo. At one point, Fulbert exclaims, "Your absence often reminds me how important your presence was". Hildegar also corresponded with Duke William V of Aquitaine, whom he calls a "friend" (amicus) in the technical sense of a lay supporter of a cleric. He may have written some of the duke's official correspondence, such as the letter to Anselm, bishop of Vercelli.

== Sources ==
- McGuire, Brian Patrick (2010). Friendship and Community: The Monastic Experience, 350–1250 (2nd ed.). Cornell University Press.
- Southern, R. W. (1953). The Making of the Middle Ages. New Haven: Yale University Press.
