= Charroux, Vienne =

Charroux
- Commune
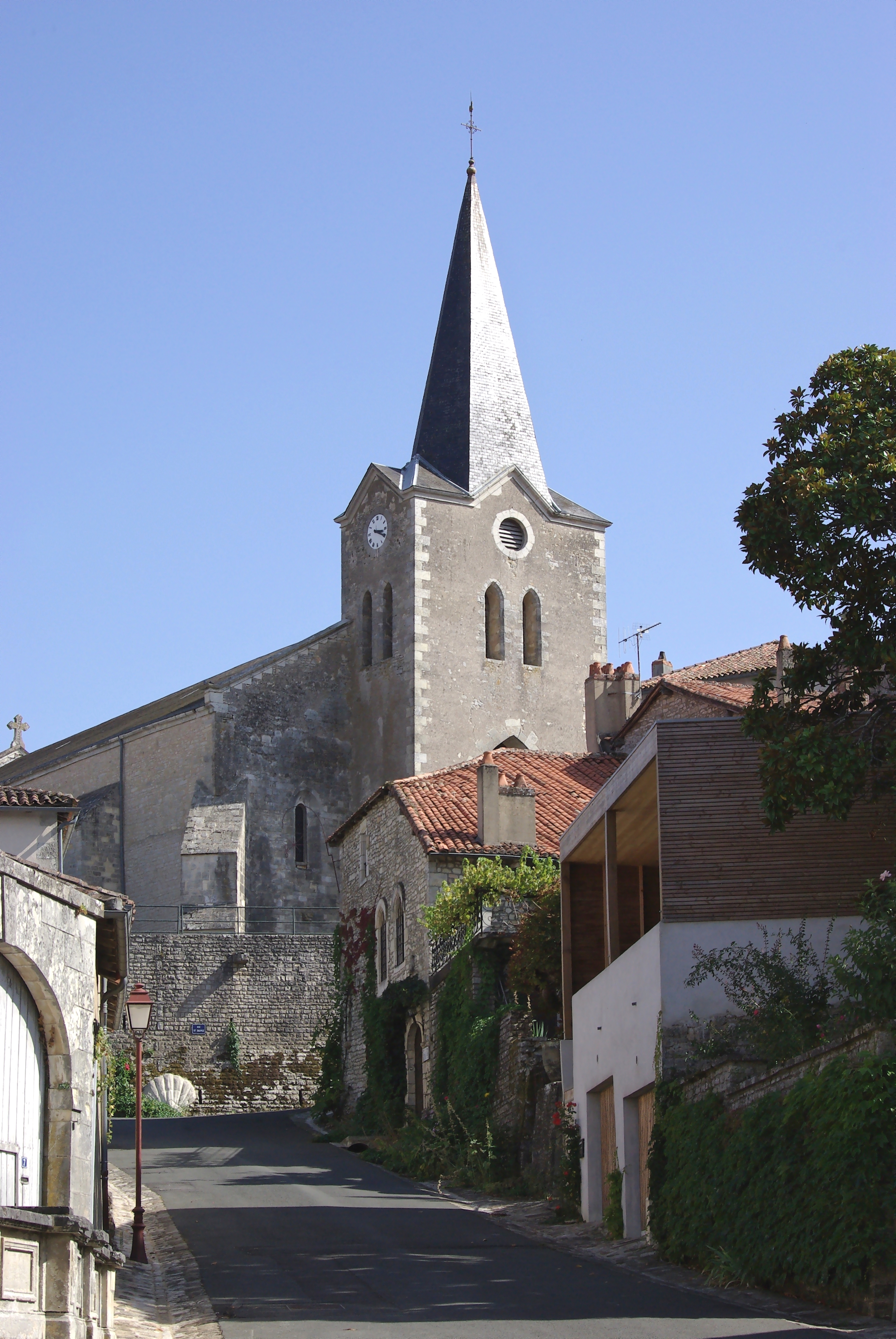
- The church of Saint-Sulpice, in Charroux

- Coat of arms
- Location of Charroux
- Location within France Location within Nouvelle-Aquitaine
- Coordinates: 46°08′43″N 0°24′16″E
- Country: France
- Region: Nouvelle-Aquitaine
- Department: Vienne
- Arrondissement: Châtellerault
- Canton: Civray
- Intercommunality: Civraisien en Poitou

Government
  - Mayor (2020–2026): Patrice Bosseboeuf
- Area^{1}: 44.29 km^{2} (17.10 sq mi)
- Elevation: 165 m (541 ft)
- Highest elevation: 178 m (584 ft)
- Lowest elevation: 115 m (377 ft)
- Population (2023): 1,036
  - Density: 23.39/km^{2} (60.58/sq mi)
- Time zone: UTC+01:00 (CET)
  - Summer (DST): UTC+02:00 (CEST)
- INSEE/Postal code: 86061 /86250
- ^{1} French Land Register data, which excludes lakes, ponds, glaciers > 1 km^{2} (0.386 sq mi or 247 acres) and river estuaries.

Charroux (French pronunciation: [ʃaʁu]) is a commune in the Vienne department, in the region of Nouvelle-Aquitaine, western France.

The remains of the Benedictine Charroux Abbey, founded in the 8th century, are preserved in the town. Said to be the site of the Council of Charroux in 989 where the bishops of Aquitaine met to protect the immunity of the clergy and suggested that the church should guarantee that the poor might live in peace.

== Demographics ==
Historical population
Year	Pop.	±% p.a.
1968	1,621	—
1975	1,644	+0.20%
1982	1,552	−0.82%
1990	1,428	−1.04%
1999	1,320	−0.87%
2007	1,185	−1.34%
2012	1,184	−0.02%
2017	1,136	−0.82%
2023	1,036	−1.52%
Source: INSEE

== See also ==
- Communes of the Vienne department
