= Adémar de Chabannes =

11th-century French monk (988/989–1034)

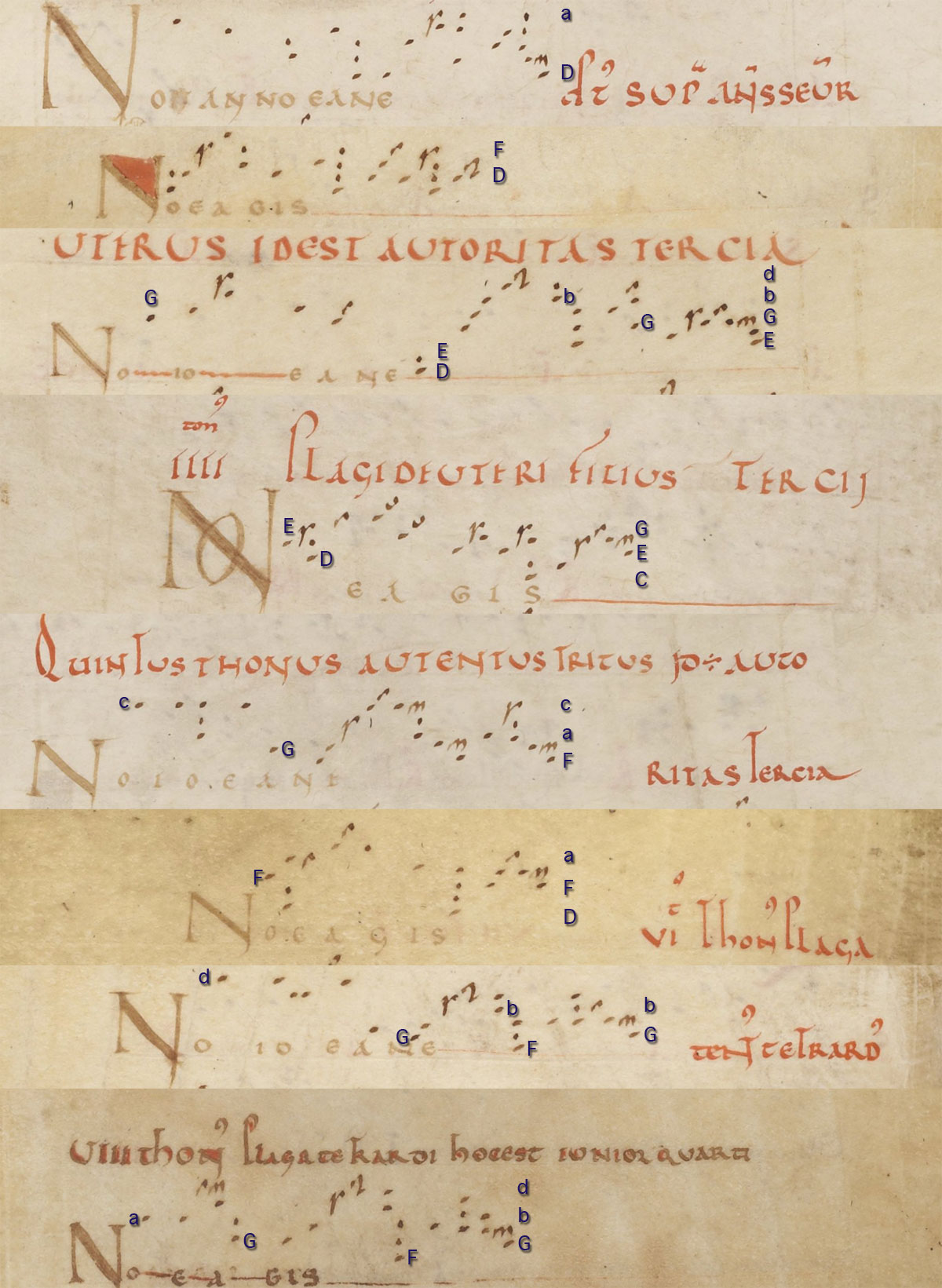
The intonation formulas for the 8 tones according to the Aquitanian tonary, which was partly notated by Adémar

Adémar de Chabannes (988/989 – 1034; also Adhémar de Chabannes) was a French/Frankish monk, active as a composer, scribe, historian, poet, grammarian and literary forger. He was associated with the Abbey of Saint Martial, Limoges, where he was a central figure in the Saint Martial school, an important center of medieval music. Much of his career was spent copying and transcribing earlier accounts of Frankish history; his major work was the Chronicon Aquitanicum et Francicum (Chronicle of Aquitaine and France).

He is well known for forging a Vita, purportedly by Aurelian of Limoges, that indicated Saint Martial was one of the original apostles, and for composing an associated Mass for Saint Martial. Though he successfully convinced the local bishop and abbot of its authenticity, the traveling monk Benedict of Chiusa exposed his forgery and damaged Adémar's reputation.

== Life and career ==
Besides perhaps Guillaume de Machaut, more is known about the life of Adémar than any other medieval composer. Part of this was from the well-recorded notoriety he would achieve from various infamous events, but also because the Abbey in which he worked preserved a huge amount of his literary and musical manuscripts. Unlike other documents there, the Adémar collection was later purchased by Louis XV, and thus spared from the substantial destruction of documents there during the French Revolution.

Adémar was born at Chabannes, a village in today's Haute-Vienne département of France. Educated at the Abbey Saint-Martial de Limoges, he passed his life as a monk both there and at the monastery of Saint-Cybard at Angoulême. Adémar died around 1034, most probably at Jerusalem, where he had gone on a pilgrimage.

== Works ==
=== Adémar as chronicler ===
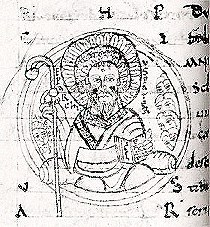
Adémar de Chabannes manuscript drawing of St. Cybard in Adémar's hand.

Adémar's life was mainly spent in writing and transcribing chant books and chronicles, and his principal work is a history entitled Chronicon Aquitanicum et Francicum or Historia Francorum. This is in three books and deals with Frankish history from the reign of Pharamond, king of the Franks, to 1028. The first two books are scarcely more than a copy of earlier histories of Frankish kings, such as the Liber Historiae Francorum, the Continuation of Fredegar and the Annales regni Francorum. The third book, which deals with the period from 814 to 1028, is of considerable historical importance. It relies partly on the Chronicon Aquitanicum, to which Adémar himself added a final notice for the year 1028.

=== Cantor, hymnographer and notator ===
When Adémar joined the Abbey Saint Martial of Limoges, he was educated by his uncle Roger de Chabannes, cantor of the Abbey between 1010 until his death in 1025. Adémar apparently succeeded his uncle as cantor on his death.

Adémar contributed as a notator to the Abbey's existing chant books learning from his uncle and other manuscripts where he contributed important parts, especially his own compositions. Adémar composed his own musical Mass and Office in the forms developed by the local school of his uncle Roger, using modal patterns documented in the tonaries of the new troper-prosers, a chant book organised in libellum structure which separated the contents into collections dedicated to chant genres, especially innovative ones such as tropus and sequence and the elaborated chant of the offertorium. This libellum type was rather extravagant and carefully made by collecting a range of individual contributions.

=== Adémar's forgeries ===
He embraced the developing tale that Saint Martial, the third century bishop who Christianized the Limoges district, had actually lived centuries earlier, and was in fact one of the original apostles. And he supplemented the less than scanty documentation for the alleged 'apostolicity' of Martial, first with a forged Life of Martial, as if composed by Martial's successor, Bishop Aurelian. To effect this claim, he composed an "Apostolic Mass" that still exists in Adémar's own hand. The local bishop and abbot seem to have cooperated in the project and the mass was first sung on Sunday, 3 August 1029.

Unfortunately for Adémar, the liturgy was disrupted by a travelling monk, Benedict of Chiusa, who denounced the improved Vita of Martial as a provincial forgery and the new liturgy as offensive to God. The word spread, and the promising young monk was disgraced. Adémar's reaction was to build forgery upon forgery, inventing a Council of 1031 that confirmed the 'apostolic' status of Martial, even a forged papal letter.

In the long run, Adémar was successful. By the late 11th century, Martial was indeed venerated in Aquitaine as an apostle, though his legend was doubted elsewhere. The reality of this tissue of forgeries was only unravelled in the 1920s, by the historian Louis Saltet. Mainstream Catholic historians ignored Saltet's revelations until the 1990s.

== The Mass for Saint Martial ==
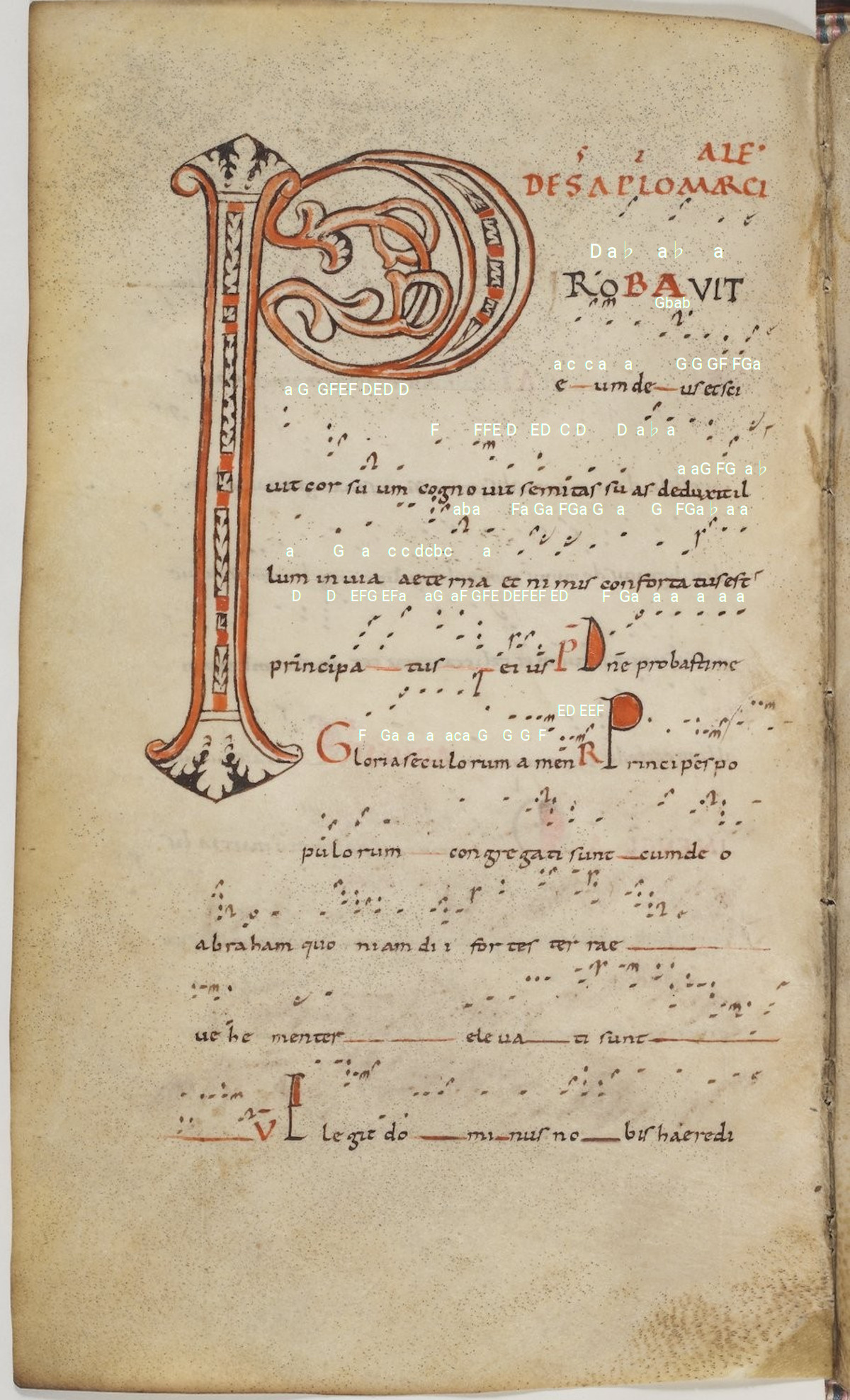
Missa Sancti Marcialis «De sancto apostolo Marciale» with poetry and music composed by Adémar de Chabannes (F-Pn lat. 909, f. 70')

As an apostle, Saint Martial would be entitled to a substantial mass for the celebration of his feast day within a festal octave. Adémar therefore composed a series of hymns, providing both text and music due to his position as cantor at Saint Martial. This he did by troping, i.e. adding additional text to a number of pre-existing hymns and sequences, also providing proper mass chant for Saint Martial as apostle and patron of the Monastery. Following the libellum structure of the manuscript, the elements of the mass are not presented continuously, since the alleluia verses preceding the Gospel and offertories of the Mass were separated as "little books" (libelli), while the sequences are written in a third one.

The apostolic mass composed for Saint Martial was exceptionally written unseparated but without the tropes, very likely later on some blank pages of the libellum with the troper of proper chant. The collection dedicated to the birth of the patron saint started separately with newly composed alleluia verses (f. 61'-62), office tropes for the same occasion (f. 62'-70), the whole untroped mass (f. 70'-71), tropes and processional antiphons (f. 71'-73'). It was a kind of addition, because the regular proprium tropes had been written already (f. 42-46').

- Introit «Probauit eum» (F-Pn lat. 909, f. 70').
- Gradual «Principes populorum» V. «Elegit dominus» (F-Pn lat. 909, f. 70'-71)
- All «Alleluia» V. «Beati oculi» (F-Pn lat. 909, f. 71).
- Offertorium «Diligo uirginitatem» (F-Pn lat. 909, f. 71-71')
  - V1. «Praeceptum a domino»
  - V2. «Designatus a domino»
- Communio «Nolite gaudere» (F-Pn lat. 909, f. 71')
- Sequence «Arce polorum» (F-Pn lat. 909, f. 198-199')
- Sequence «Apostolorum gloriosa» (F-Pn lat. 909, f. 199'-201').

Finally, recognising the scale of the mass he as cantor had composed for the monastic community of Limoges Abbey, it needed to make clear that the local patron saint had now to be considered an apostle. Therefore, the rubric said «De sancto apostolo Marciale».

=== Adémar's technique as notator ===
These pages of the Troper-Sequentiary give not only evidence of Adémar's skills as a hymnographer and composing cantor, they also show his sophisticated way as a notator of using custodes to help the reader's orientation between the lines. The change to another line was preferably chosen where a certain unit like a membrum «Probauit | eum deus | et sci-[break to the third line]uit | cor suum» was complete, but not always. If the first note on the next line was expected on the same pitch, an "e" for "equaliter" as a so-called "significant letter" was set instead of a custos. The Aquitanian notation also had many agogic details, but could be written in a way that groupings would be still visible, even if a large interval separated them. In comparison with contemporary Italian neume notation which tried to display intervals by a vertical adjustment to represent visibly the difference in height like here, the groups always had to stick together and were difficult to write since the dots needed to be connected. Aquitanian neumes not only spared ink in comparison, but their ability to disconnect connected neumes was also much easier to write. It was an ingenious invention of Roger de Chabannes' and the preceding generation and his nephew improved it, so that the manuscripts of their scriptorium were the finest written in Aquitaine.

The only problem was to understand what was the church tone. Here similar to William of Volpiano's method the tonary worked like a key. The psalmody was indicated afterwards and crucial was the so-called «differentia», the way it ended. At the end of the introit, there was the incipit of the psalm «Domine probasti me» (Ps 138) and the «differentia» was notated with the concluding small doxology «seculorum[.] amen[.]». As such it had to be looked up at the tonary dedicated to the psalmody of the Mass chant genre introit which started on folio 255 recto. Doing this, one finds the differentia in the section of «In primo thono authenti proti». Thus, one understands that the beginning means D re a mi―b fa etc., which was like a stereotype to begin and develop the proper melos of the Dorian church tone.

=== The introit and Adémar as a composer of proper chant and its tropes ===
Adémar chose themes from Psalm 138 as his introit, the very same which was used in the related psalmody:

2 Domine probasti me et cognovisti me*
tu cognovisti sessionem meam et surrectionem meam
17 mihi autem nimis honorificati sunt amici tui*
Deus nimis confirmati sunt principatus eorum
23 proba me Deus et scito cor meum*
interroga me et cognosce semitas meas
24 et vide si via iniquitatis in me est*
et deduc me in via aeterna

— Liber Psalmorum iuxta Septuaginta emendatus (selected verses from Ps 138)
Translation:

2 Lord, Thou hast tried and recognised me*
Thou knowest my downsitting and mine uprising
17 How honoured are also thy friends unto me*
O God, how great has proved the sum of them
23 Search me, O God, and know my heart*
Question me, and know my ways
24 And see if there might be any restlessness in me*
and lead me on to the eternal way

but converted his paraphrasing antiphon to a less personal one than the psalm text:

Probauit eum deus et sciuit cor suum
cognouit semitas suas
deduxit illum in uia aeterna
et nimis confortatus est principatus eius

— Adémar de Chabannes' new introit for Saint Martial as apostle
Translation:

God tried him and saw through his heart
He understood his ways
guided the same on the eternal way
and so mighty is His principle

By repeating the melody of the beginning over the last word of the verse «semitas | suas / deduxit illum», there is a kind of enjambement, because the musical form separates the word from its grammatical context and connects it with the next verse. The musical emphasis is on the word "eternal" with a melisma in the higher register.

But as yet the text said nothing about the patron saint of Limoges, it was just paraphrasing some verses taken from Psalm 138. They needed to be embellished by additional tropes preceding each verse. And many of these tropes already existed by the time of Roger de Chabannes.

In the period of 80 years before Roger de Chabannes was cantor the number of tropes for this introitus had grown from three to seventeen. The three oldest tropes were «Haec est psallite» (in F-Pn lat. 1120 on folio 49 verso reworked with the beginning «Psallite omnes»), «Coronam sacerdocii» which follows the beginning of the old introit «Statuit ei dominus» and divides the second part of the first verse «Testamentum pacis», the trope continues «Quo uniti simus fide» etc. (reworked in F-Pn lat. 1120 on folio 49 verso with an introductory trope «Celsa polorum pontus»), the third trope is «Marcialis meriti».

Adémar obviously refined the local tradition and reduced the number of tropes. According to James Grier he added two tropes «Sanctus Marcialis» and «Christi discipulus» of his own composition, and reworked the first «Plebs devota deus» of this huge collection, to adapt the former celebration of the patron-saint as a bishop-confessor to his new role as an apostle. As one can see in the former Troper in F-Pn lat. 1120, the incipits of the former introit «Statuit ei dominus» were erased, but new incipits were copied for only two of seventeen tropes, as the redacting scribe tried to adapt the old collection to the text and meaning of the new introit. The very first trope «Plebs devota deus» did not have the new incipits, very likely because Adémar did not regard them as suitable; instead he recomposed the trope. The scribe did not continue his redaction for the rest of the collection, probably finding his efforts no longer useful, but fixed the collection in the tropers of F-Pn lat. 1121 and 909. This scribe was very likely Adémar who checked very carefully the change within the intertextual relationship and how the new meaning was generated between trope and antiphon. Thus, it is useful to study his adaption by comparing the version of this trope in the old introit (F-Pn lat. 1120, f. 46) with the revision, or rather the re-composition, of the new introit (F-Pn lat. 909, f. 42).

From a grammatical and metrical point of view Adémar's changes of the psalm verses seemed to have adapted the new introit «Probauit eum» to the former «Statuit ei», as if he tried re-troping the old antiphon (the neumes of the incipits show a vague resemblance), but it is clear that he also reworked the music carefully to the new text. Except for the last verse, the metric structure was almost identical: «Statuit» (14-8-11-4) and «Probavit» (13-8-11-14).

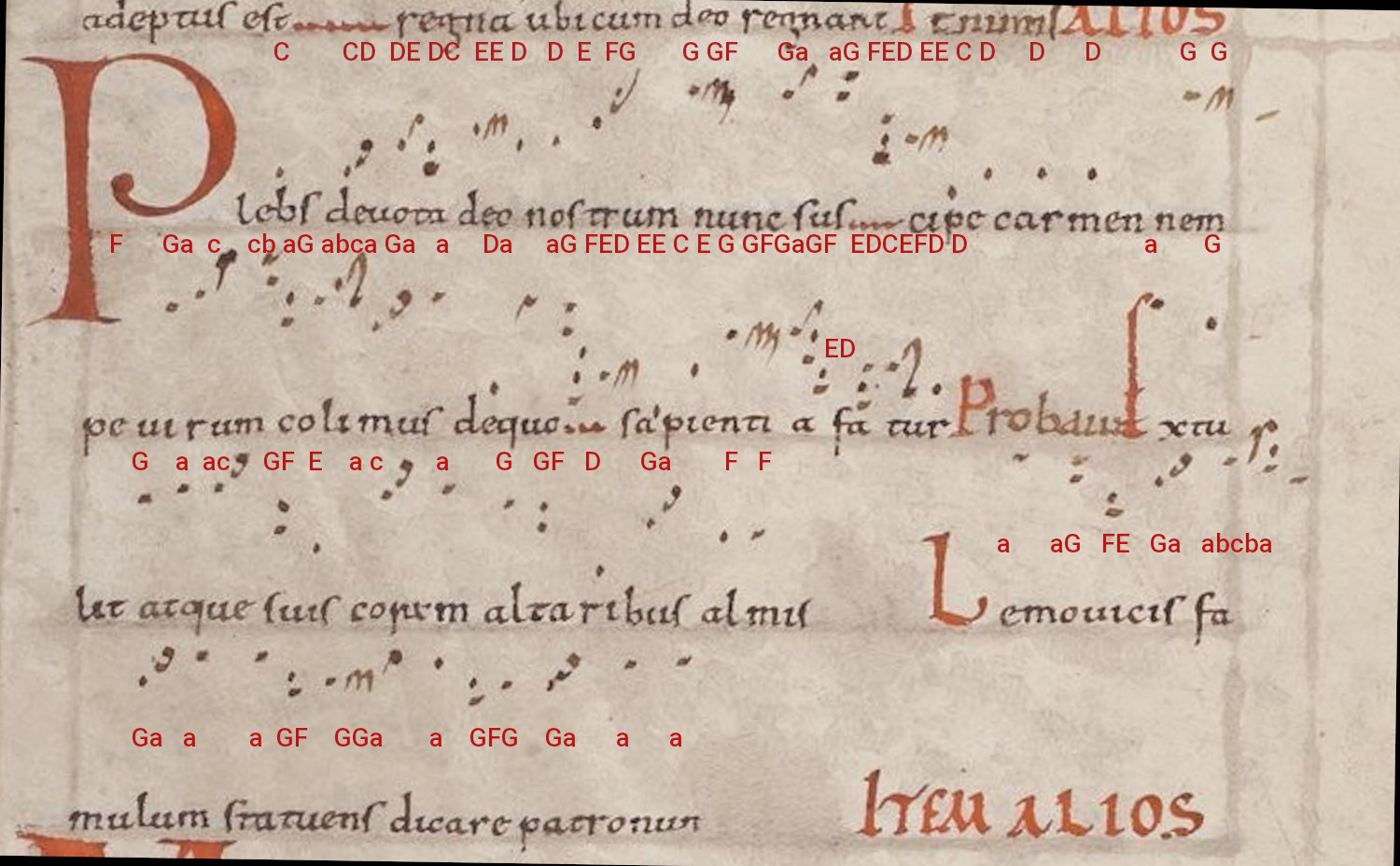
Traditional trope «Plebs deuota deo nostrum» for the Patron Saint Martial of Limoges (F-Pn lat. 1121, f. 29)

This was the text of the old introit together with the old version of the trope «Plebs devota deo» (the additional troped text is in italics):

Plebs deuota deo nostrum nunc suscipe carmen
Nempe uirum colimus de quo sapientia fatur
Statuit ei dominus testamentum pacis
Extulit atque suis coram altaribus almis
et principem fecit eum
Lemouicis famulum statuens dicare pathronum
ut sit illi sacerdocis dignitas
in aeternum

— Troped introit opening the Mass for the patron Saint Martial
Translation:

People devoted to our God, receive now the song
Indeed we adore men through whom wisdom appears
He established for him the testament of peace
and raised publicly at his beatifying altars
and he made him the leader
to call the founding servant of Limoges the patron
so that the same would have the dignity of priesthood
forever

Adémar did not just change the following verses, he also changed slightly the end of the first line by replacing the words «sapientia fatur» with «sacra verba profantur». With the new antiphon paraphrasing psalm 138, there is a contrast between the mundane context of the trope and the scriptural context of the antiphon:

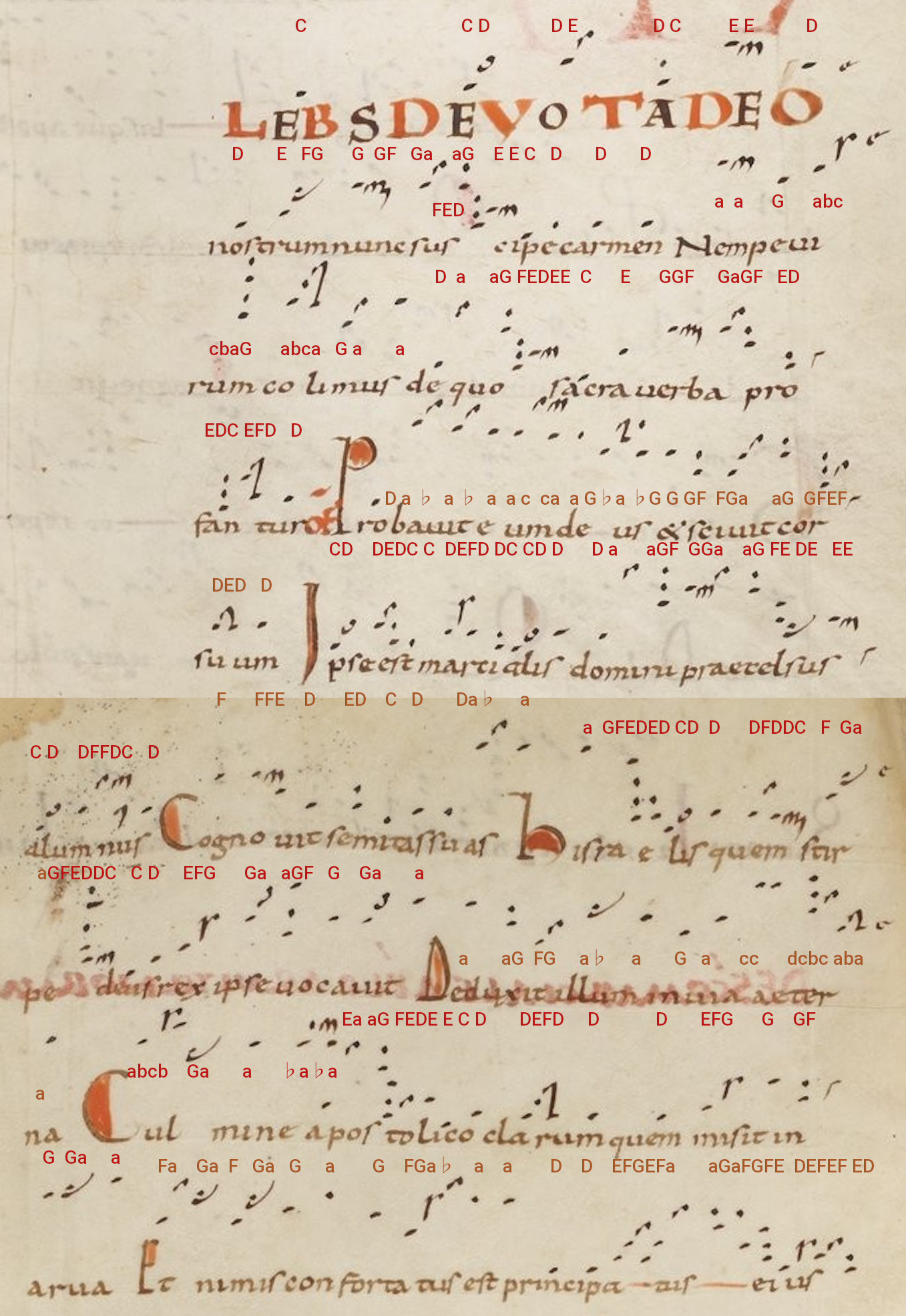
The same trope adapted and recomposed by Adémar de Chabannes to his new introit «Probauit eum» written by his own hand (F-Pn lat. 909, f. 42-42')

Plebs deuota deo nostrum nunc suscipe carmen
Nempe uirum colimus de quo sacra verba profantur
Probauit eum deus et sciuit cor suum
Ipse est martialis domini praecelsus alumnus
cognouit semitas suas
Hisraelis quem stirpe deus rex ipse uocauit
deduxit illum in uia aeterna
Culmine apostolico clarum quem misit in arua
et nimis confortatus est principatus eius

— Troped introit for the apostle Saint Martial rearranged by Adémar de Chabannes
Translation:

People devoted to our God, receive now the song
Indeed we adore men through whom holy words are predicted
God tried him and saw through his heart
The very same is Martial, the very high alumnus of the Lord
He understood his ways
God called Him of the stirps of Israel king of the same
guided the same on the eternal way
Illuminated by the apostolic height are those He sent on the acres
and so mighty is His principle

In Adémar's older troper (F-Pn lat. 1121, f. 29) this revision had not yet been completed, and the incipits of the new antiphon had not yet been written from the second verse on. In his book James Grier (2006, 309) mentions that the scribe of a later Troper Sequentiary (F-Pn lat. 1119, f. 49'-50) simply combined both versions of the same trope with the new introit, so that a cantor had to decide between Pa 1121 and Pa 909.

Although history shows that the plan to establish Saint Martial as an apostle succeeded, in the short-term the Mass itself was neglected. In particular after his death, when the Abbey Saint Martial came under Cluniac administration, the Gradual and its redaction of tropes and sequences (F-Pn lat. 1132), written about 1075, was conventionally organised and completely dismissed Adémar's contribution to the local tradition of the Abbey Saint Martial in Limoges.

== Legacy ==
James Grier, Professor of Music History in the Don Wright Faculty of Music at the University of Western Ontario, identifies Adémar as one of the first to write music using the musical notation still in use today. He placed the musical notes above the text, higher or lower according to the pitch: Professor Grier states that "Placement on the vertical axis remains the standard convention for indicating pitch in notation in Western culture and there is far greater weight on pitch than on many other elements such as dynamics and timbre".

== Sources ==
- Liber manualis or notebooks of Ademar of Chabannes, MS VLO 15, 1023–1025, Leiden University Libraries
- "Paris, Bibliothèque Nationale, fonds lat., Ms. 1240". Troper from the church St. Salvator Mundi, St. Martial Abbey in Limoges, partly with later added notation (933-936).
- "Paris, Bibliothèque Nationale, fonds lat., Ms. 1084". Abridged Antiphonary from the church St. Salvator Mundi, St. Martial Abbey in Limoges, with later modal classifications by Roger & Adémar de Chabannes (late 10th century).
- "Paris, Bibliothèque Nationale, fonds lat., Ms. 1118". Troper, Tonary, Sequentiary and Proser from Southwestern France, Région d'Auch with diastematic Aquitanian notation (987–96).
- "Paris, Bibliothèque Nationale, fonds lat., Ms. 1120". Troper, Proser, Processional of St. Martial de Limoges, with later added florid organum (late 10th century).
- "Paris, Bibliothèque Nationale, fonds lat., Ms. 1121". Troper, Sequentiary, and Tonary of St. Martial de Limoges, Adémar de Chabannes (1025).
- "Paris, Bibliothèque Nationale, fonds lat., Ms. 909". Troper, Sequentiary, and Tonary of St. Martial de Limoges (1032).
- "Paris, Bibliothèque Nationale, fonds lat., Ms. 1119". Troper and Sequentiary of St. Martial de Limoges (1050s).
- "Paris, Bibliothèque Nationale, fonds lat., Ms. 1132". Gradual in the usual calendaric order with a troper for ordinary and proper chant as appendix of St. Martial de Limoges (1075).

== Editions ==
- Jules Chavanon, ed. (1897). "Chronicon Aquitanicum et Francicum» or «Historia Francorum". Chronicon ― Collection des textes pour servir à l'étude et à l'enseignement de l'histoire. Vol. 20. Paris.
- Edmond Pognon, ed. (1947). L'an mille. Oeuvres de Liutprand, Raoul Glaber, Adémar de Chabannes, Adalberon [et] Helgaud. Mémoires du passé pour servir au temps présent. Vol. 6. Paris.

== Studies ==
- Grier, James (1995). "Roger de Chabannes (d. 1025), Cantor of St Martial, Limoges". Early Music History. 14: 53–119. doi:10.1017/s0261127900001443. JSTOR 853930. S2CID 193229234.
- Grier, James (1997). "Editing Adémar de Chabannes' liturgy for the Feast of St Martial". Plainsong & Medieval Music. 6 (2): 97–118. doi:10.1017/S0961137100001303. ISSN 0961-1371. S2CID 162538876.
- Grier, James (2003). "The Music is the Message: Music in the Apostolic Liturgy of Saint Martial". Plainsong and Medieval Music. 12 (1): 1–14. doi:10.1017/S0961137103003012. S2CID 162554319.
- Grier, James (2005). "The Musical Autographs of Adémar de Chabannes (989–1034)". Early Music History. 24: 125–168. doi:10.1017/S0261127905000100. S2CID 194078301.
- Grier, James (2001). "Adémar de Chabannes". Grove Music Online. Oxford: Oxford University Press. doi:10.1093/gmo/9781561592630.article.52477. ISBN 978-1-56159-263-0. (subscription, Wikilibrary access, or UK public library membership required)
- Grier, James (2006). The Musical World of a Medieval Monk: Adémar de Chabannes in Eleventh-century Aquitaine. Cambridge: Cambridge University Press. ISBN 978-0-521-85628-7.
- Grier, James (2006). "The Music is the Message II: Adémar de Chabannes' Music for the Apostolic Office of Saint Martial". Plainsong and Medieval Music. 15 (1): 43–54. doi:10.1017/S0961137106000246. S2CID 162870563.
- Grier, James (2013). "Adémar de Chabannes (989–1034) and musical literacy". Journal of the American Musicological Society. 66 (3): 605–638. doi:10.1525/jams.2013.66.3.605. ISSN 1547-3848.
- Grier, James (2018). Ademarvs Cabannensis monachvs et mvsicvs. Corpus Christianorum / Autographa medii aevi. Vol. 7. Turnhout: Brepols Publishers. ISBN 978-2-503-52395-8.
- Landes, Richard (1995). Relics, Apocalypse, and the Deceits of History: Ademar of Chabannes, 989-1034. Cambridge: Harvard UP.
- Leyser, Karl. "The Ascent of Latin Europe." In Communications and Power in Medieval Europe. The Carolingian and Ottonian Centuries London, 1994. Inaugural lecture, first published as Karl Leyser, The Ascent of Latin Europe. Oxford, 1986.
- "Adhémar De Chabannes | Frankish historian". Encyclopædia Britannica. Chicago: Encyclopædia Britannica, Inc. 1 January 2020.
