= Berland =

Berland is a surname. Notable people with the surname include:

- André Berland (1940–2025), French historian and biographer
- Bjørn Berland (born 1977), Norwegian footballer
- Eliezer Berland (born 1937), Israeli Breslov rabbi
- François Berléand (born 1958), French actor
- Gary Berland (1950–1988), American professional poker player
- Gretchen Berland, American physician and filmmaker
- Jean-Marie Berland (born 1878), French businessman and politician in Guyane
- Kjartan Berland (born 1972), Norwegian politician
- Leslie Berland, first Chief Marketing Officer of Twitter
- Lucien Berland (1888–1962), French entomologist and arachnologist
- Michael Berland (born 1968), founder and CEO of Decode_M and Edelman
- Pey Berland (c. 1380 – 1458), Archbishop of Bordeaux from 1430 to 1456
- Robert Berland (born 1961), American judoka
- Roland Berland (born 1945), French racing cyclist
- Thibaut Berland (born 1981), French producer and DJ, better known as Breakbot
- Yvon Berland (born 1951), French university professor and administrator

Berland is also used as a given name, though rarely. Notable people with the given name include:

- Berland Anthony (1923–?), Indian professional footballer

== Other uses ==
- Berland River, a stream in Alberta, Canada; tributary of the Athabasca River
- Berland, Askøy, a village of Askøy Municipality in Vestland county, Norway
- Berland., taxonomic author abbreviation of Jean-Louis Berlandier (1803–1851), French-Mexican naturalist, physician, and anthropologist
- Tour Pey-Berland, the bell tower of the Bordeaux Cathedral
