= Eutropius of Saintes =

Saint Eutropius of Saintes
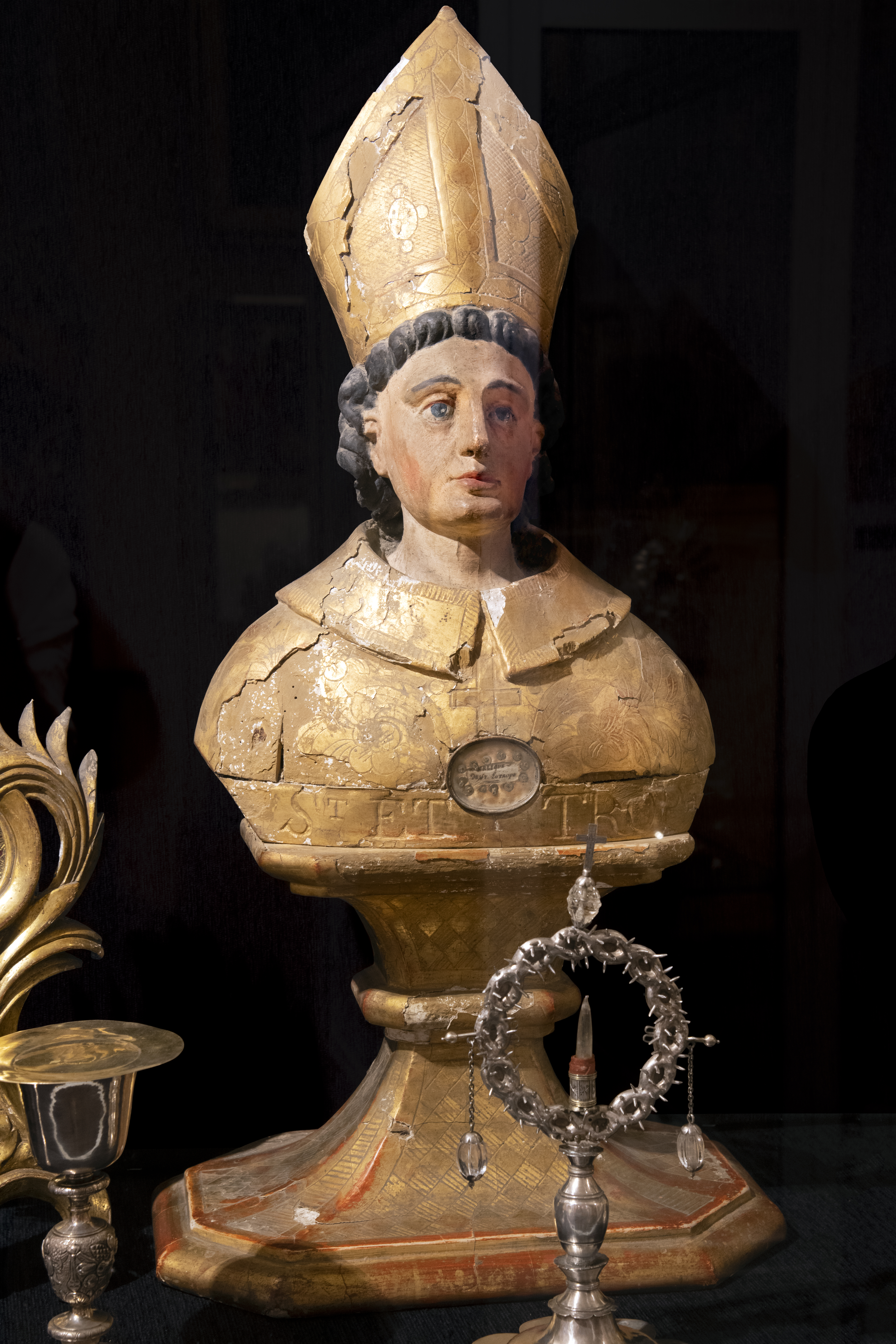
- Reliquary bust of St Eutropius of Saintes

Martyr
- Born: Rome or Persia
- Died: 1st century or 3rd century Saintes, France
- Venerated in: Roman Catholic Church, Eastern Orthodox Church
- Major shrine: Basilica of St Eutropius, Saintes
- Feast: April 30

Saint Eutropius of Saintes (French: Saint Eutrope) is venerated as the first bishop of Saintes, France. According to tradition, he was a Roman or a Persian of royal descent who was sent to evangelize Gaul either by Saint Clement in the 1st century or by Pope Fabian in the 250s as a companion of Saint Denis.

He lived as a hermit near Saintes and converted to Christianity the governor's daughter, Saint Eustella or Eustelle. According to tradition, the governor was so enraged by his daughter's conversion that he had both her and Eutropius killed. Eutropius was killed by having his head split open with an axe.

Eutropius's tomb is preserved in the Basilica of Saint Eutropius in Saintes, the church dedicated to his cult and one of the city's principal medieval religious monuments.

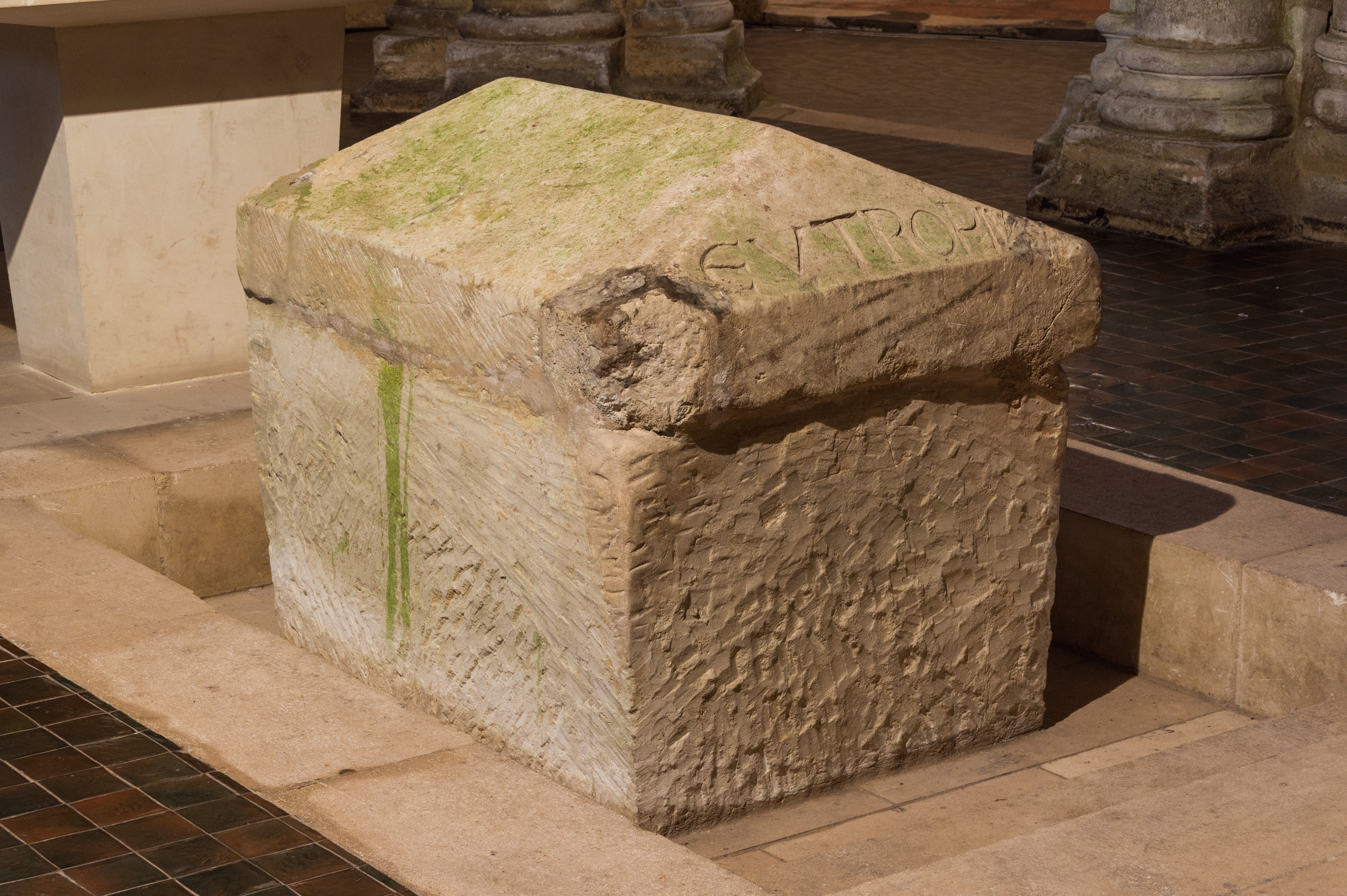
The tomb of St Eutropius in the Basilica of St Eutropius in Saintes

Gregory of Tours mentions the tradition of Eutropius' martyrdom in his work, but also notes that before Bishop Palladius of Saintes translated Eutropius' relics around 590 to a church dedicated to him in Saintes, no one really knew the legend of Eutropius. In the 6th century, the poet Venantius Fortunatus refers to Eutropius in connection with Saintes.
