= Bertram (bishop of Bordeaux) =

Bertram was a bishop of the archdiocese of Bordeaux in the 6th century. He served as bishop from around 566 to 585.

== Gregory of Tours ==
Most of what is known about him comes from Gregory of Tours' writings. According to Gregory, Bertram was present at the church synod that condemned Prætextatus in 577. He and Ragnemod, bishop of Paris, acted against Gregory at the council and he supported Prætextatus' condemnation.

Leudaste, count of Tours, accused Bertram of having an affair with King Chilperic I's wife Fredegunda. Chilperic disbelieved the accusation and punished Leudast for making it. A church council later excommunicated Leudast for making these accusations in 581. Bertram had alleged that Gregory had been the source of this rumour.

He and Palladius of Saintes both supported Gundoald in his attempt to usurp the Frankish throne. They were later examined by other bishops for why they had ordained Faustian as bishop of Dax at Gundoald's command. King Guntram also denounced their actions. Palladius, who was Betram's suffragan bishop took responsibility for this and excused Bertram by saying: "My metropolitan was suffering greatly from sore eyes and I was plundered and treated with indignity and dragged to the place against my will. I could do nothing else than obey one who said he had received complete control of the Gauls."

He was related to Queen Ingund, wife of Chlothar I and Bertechramnus bishop of Le Mans.
