= Gombaud =

Gombaud may mean:

- Gombaud, a brand of wine produced in Château Lascombes
- Antoine Gombaud, Chevalier de Méré, a French writer
- Jean Ogier de Gombauld, a French playwright and poet
- Gombald or Gundobald, an Archbishop of Bordeaux
