= Peter VIII =

Peter VIII may refer to:

- Peter VIII, bishop of the Ancient Diocese of Saintes in 1284–87
- Peter VIII, bishop of the Roman Catholic Diocese of Sapë in 1843/1845–1873
