= Faustianus =

Faustianus (also known as Faustian) was a bishop of the former diocese of Dax in the 6th century.

== Episcopate ==
In the 580s, while Gundoald was trying to usurp the Frankish throne from the Merovingian monarchs, he appointed people to vacant offices within the territory that he controlled. At that time period, the appointment of bishops was also a power that belonged to kings. Therefore, when he found that the diocese of Dax was without a bishop, he appointed Faustianus, who was a priest. The Merovingians had wanted to appoint a count named Nicetius as the new bishop.

Gundoald succeeded in getting Bertram, archbishop of Bordeaux, Palladius, bishop of Saintes, and Orestes, bishop of Bazas, to carry out the ordination.

However, Gundoald lost the war and the territory was retaken by Guntram, a Merovingian king. Following the war, Guntram and other Frankish bishops criticized the bishops who had taken part in the ordination. Faustianus was deposed from his diocese and replaced with Nicetius; however, Bertram, Palladius and Orestes were ordered to supply him with food and one hundred gold pieces every year.
