= Sancho IV =

Sancho IV can refer to:

- Duke Sancho IV Garcés of Gascony (d. 950x955)
- King Sancho IV of Navarre (d. 1076)
- King Sancho IV of Castile (c. 1257 – 1295)
