= Gundigisil =

Gundigisil (French: Gondégisile) was a bishop of the archdiocese of Bordeaux in the 6th century.

== Episcopate ==
He is known from Gregory of Tours' writing.

He was one of the bishops sent by King Guntram to judge the case of the monastic rebellion that took place at the Monastery of the Holy Cross in Poitiers. Poitiers at the time, was a suffragan diocese of Bordeaux. He summoned the nuns to meet him, but they ignored the summons.

During these events Gundigisil sent a letter to Bishop Veranus of Cavaillon as well as other bishops asking for advice about how to punish the nuns. The response sent back to Gundigisil was that they agreed with his opinion to excommunicate them. The nuns were later excommunicated.
