= Geoffrey II (archbishop of Bordeaux) =

Frankish archbishop (died 1043)

Geoffrey II (also spelled Godfrey in some sources) (died 1043) was a Frankish archbishop of Bordeaux. He was selected jointly by William V of Aquitaine and Sancho VI of Gascony in 1027.

As a Frank, he directed his attention northwards, in the Limousin (1028) and Saintonge (1030). He founded the monastery of Barbezieux in 1037.
