= Pey Berland =

Roman Catholic archbishop (c. 1380–1458)

- Titular Archbishop of Madytus
- Church: Catholic Church
- See: Madytus
- In office: 24 September 1456 – 1458
- Predecessor: Position established
- Successor: Giovanni Battista Petrucci
- Previous post: Archbishop of Bordeuax (1430-1456)

Orders
- Consecration: 25 December 1530 by Pope Martin V

Personal details
- Born: c. 1380 Avensan, Duchy of Gascony, Duchy of Aquitaine
- Died: 1458 Avensan, Guyenne, Kingdom of France
- Coat of arms

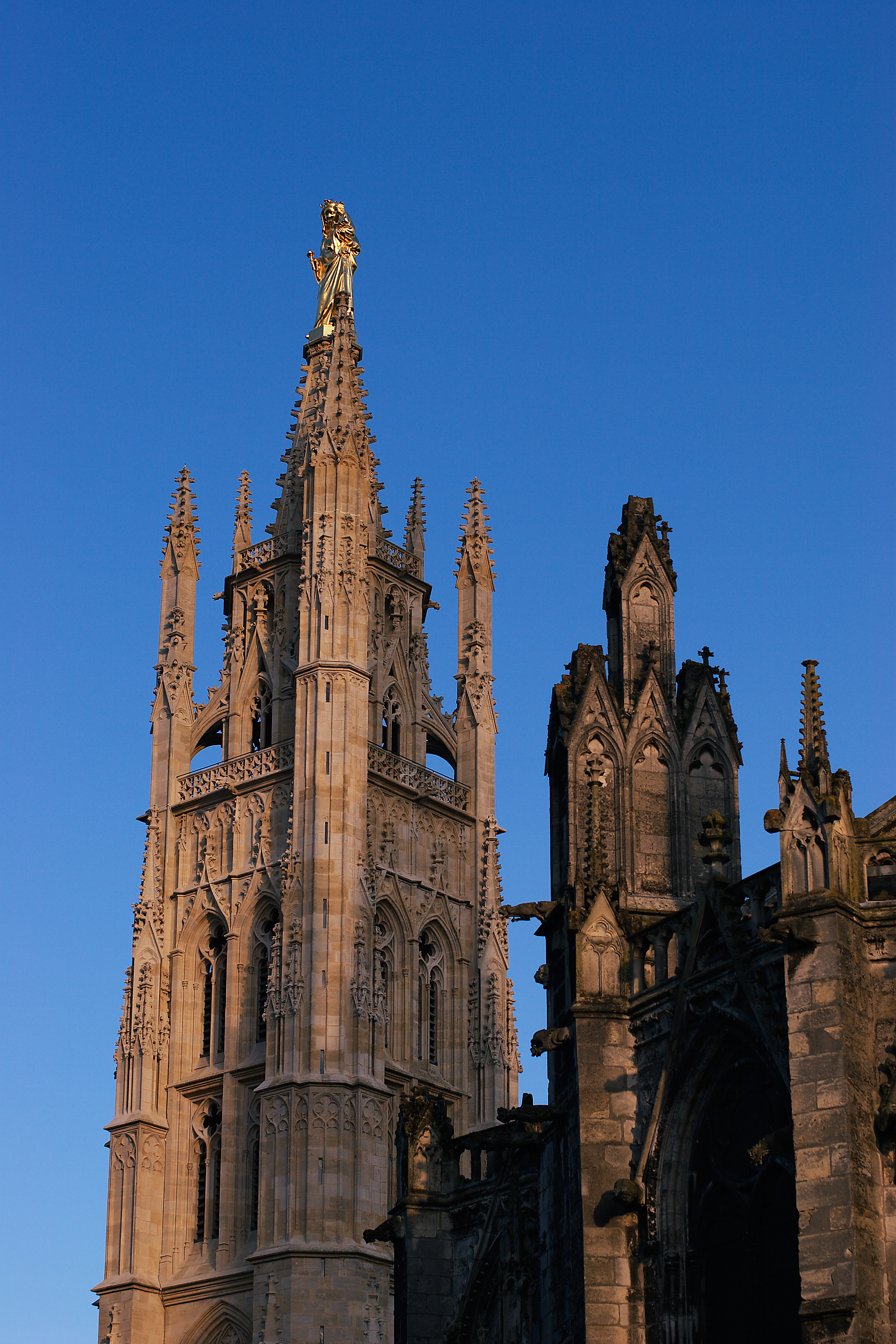
The Tour Pey-Berland (or Pierre Berland) in Bordeaux, which was constructed by Berland and named after him

Blessed Pey Berland (or Peyberland, from Pierre Berland; c. 1380 – January 1458) was the Archbishop of Bordeaux from 1430 until his abdication, during a pivotal time in the history of the city and of Gascony. During his tenure, the city of Bordeaux remained staunchly faithful to the King of England in the last phase of the Hundred Years' War, but the French took the city in 1451.

== Education and early career ==
Berland was born in the hamlet of Saint-Raphael in the parish of Avensan in central Medoc. Though a peasant, he was educated early on by a retired local notary before moving to Bordeaux to continue his studies and enter the Church. He eventually enrolled in the University of Toulouse and received a bachelor's certificate in canon law. He was ordained at that point, though still young by the standards of the time, when most boys who entered the church put off priesthood until it was required by their office. He then caught the attention of Francesco Uguccione, the old Archbishop of Bordeaux (1384–1412), who drafted him to serve as his personal secretary.

As a secretary of an influential diplomat and cardinal, Berland travelled extensively in the early 15th century. In Autumn 1408 he accompanied Uguccione to England, where the cardinal sought to persuade the English to send a delegation to the Council of Pisa - then struggling to put an end to the Western Schism. From England, Berland and Uguccione went to Italy, and in 1410 the archbishop rewarded Berland with one of the canonries of the Cathedral of Saint-André, which included Bouliac opposite Bordeaux on the Garonne and the associate parishes of Quinsac and Lormont. In 1412 the two were in Florence when Uguccione died. Berland supervised his burial and then went on a pilgrimage to the Holy Land, before returning once more to Bordeaux.

In 1413 Berland was rewarded post mortem by his old master when Antipope John XXIII, fulfilling a request by Uguccione that "his beloved servant" Berland not be forgotten, granted the canon a prebend. He subsequently rose rapidly in the ecclesiastical ranks of Gascony and, in 1423, he was appointed by the regents of the young Henry VI to the Court of Sovereignty, a sort of appellate court, of Gascony, which sat in Bordeaux. In 1430 the archbishop David de Montferrand died and the cathedral chapter readily elected Berland to replace him, which election was unhesitatingly confirmed by Pope Martin V.

== Archiepiscopate ==
=== Patronage of building and learning ===
As archbishop, Berland pursued several building projects. He had a new hospital constructed, dedicated to Saint Peter (Saint-Pierre) near Saint-Seurin. The bell tower built at Saint-André in 1440 is still called the Tour Pey Berland today, after its founder; it had been ordered by the chapter in 1429 but it took Berland to get construction underway. Berland was also a patron of the education in his city.

In 1441, after years of urging in the Papal curia, Bordeaux was granted its own studium generale, a precursor to the University of Bordeaux. In 1442, he founded a college in his birth town of Saint-Raphael. This college was a prototype of the later diocesan seminary and in Berland's day it trained twelve young men for the priesthood. Berland bequeathed all his books to the college and he also created a fund to help purchase books for poor students at other institutions.

=== Hundred Years' War ===
Politically, Berland was resistant to French efforts to control Bordeaux and he strongly supported English sovereignty. While the French kings claimed ecclesiastical jurisdiction over Bordeaux by the Pragmatic Sanction of Bourges, Berland rejected it.

From 1434 to 1451, his leadership was essential, as the mayor of the time, Gadifer Shorthose, was weak-willed and short-sighted. During that time Berland did not deem it wise to leave his diocese; rather he sent a delegation to the Council of Basel.

On 16 July 1442, Thomas Bekynton (Bishop of Bath and Wells), in the company of Robert Roos, arrived in Bordeaux as ambassadors of the English king. The next day they took letters from Henry VI promising aid, once they had had them translated, to Berland, who read them from the pulpit the next day.

The citizens were stirred to action to help defend their city while they awaited help from England. Berland travelled to England on 26 July with letters from the ambassadors. He sent his physician back to Bordeaux in October, but he remained in England for the twofold purpose of assuring the king of the loyalty of his Gascon subjects and of keeping the plight of the Bordelais on his mind.

On 1 November 1450, a day remembered as La Male Journade ("the bad day") in Bordelais history, the citizens of Bordeaux, along with English men-at-arms and Gascon knights, sallied forth to defend the city from the encroaching armies of Amanieu of Orval, Poton de Xaintrailles, and Jean Bureau.

The Gascon defenders were routed and many citizens lost heir lives. Berland is said to have retreated into his chamber for two days to pray after seeing the mass of bodies being returned to the city.

Bordeaux was forced to come to terms before a long siege began. On 12 June 1451, the Estates of Bordeaux, represented by Pey Berland, signed a treaty with the French, represented by Xaintrailles.

On 30 June 1451, at a ceremony held in the cathedral, Pey Berland and the leading men of Bordeaux swore oaths of fealty to Charles VII of France and so the French, led by Jean de Dunois, in return recognised the privileges of Bordeaux.

=== Relationship with the French ===
It is likely that the French pressured Berland to renounce his bishopric in order that they could fill it with a more amenable Frenchman. On 7 December 1451, he made a public protest at the acts of the commission of the French seneschal of Guyenne. He ordered the commissary, Georges de Bassac, not to hold any further audiences under pain of excommunication or, probably worse, a fine.

On 7 July 1452, Berland took an oath at the altar of his church that he would never abandon or renounce his archbishopric and wished to die an archbishop. Nevertheless, he refrained from any anti-French activities for the duration of his episcopate and honoured his oath of 1451.

In September 1456, Pey Berland finally did retire from his archdiocese. He moved to his hometown of Saint-Raphael, at the college he had founded there, and where he died in January 1458.

== Sources ==
- Labarge, Margaret Wade. Gascony, England's First Colony 1204–1453. London: Hamish Hamilton, 1980.
- Vale, M. G. A. "The Last Years of English Gascony, 1451–1453: The Alexander Prize Essay." Transactions of the Royal Historical Society, 5th Ser., Vol. 19. (1969), pp. 119–138. JSTOR 3678742
