= Sancho V =

Sancho V may refer to:

- Sancho V Sánchez of Gascony (d. c. 962)
- Sancho Ramírez (c. 1042 – 1094), Sancho V of Navarre
