= Francesco Uguccione =

- Cardinal-Priest of Santi Quattro Coronati
- Church: Catholic Church
- See: Santi Quattro Coronati
- In office: 12 June 1405 – 14 July 1412
- Predecessor: Jean de Neufchâtel
- Successor: Alfonso Carrillo de Albornoz
- Other post: Archbishop of Bordeaux (1384-1412)
- Previous posts: Archbishop of Benevento (1383-1384); Bishop of Faenza (1378-1383)

Orders
- Created cardinal: 12 June 1405 by Pope Innocent VII

Personal details
- Born: Urbino, County of Urbino, Holy Roman Empire
- Died: 14 July 1412 Florence, Republic of Florence

Francesco Uguccione (or François Hugotion de Aguzzoni) (died 14 July 1412) was the Archbishop of Bordeaux from 1384 until his death. He was a lawyer from Urbino and a staunch supporter of the King of England in the Hundred Years' War.

In his early years Uguccione was a legate at Barcelona before he was appointed to the vacant see of Bordeaux.

In 1400, Uguccione, along with the Bishop of Bath and Wells, as well as Hugh le Despenser, were appointed proctors for Gascony.

By 1406, the French had gained a strong upper hand in the region. Uguccione was by then a cardinal. In spring and summer of that year he began a long string of desperate letters to the English king, Henry Bolingbroke.

He implored His Majesty for aid and assured him of the gravity of the situation, including the death of the lord of Mussidan, a Gascon loyal to the English, who had been commanding the fortress at Blaye and had left only a daughter. On 30 June, he wrote: "I have written to you so many times and so lengthily concerning the state of your land, and I have cried so much that my voice has become hoarse."

As an influential diplomat and cardinal, Uguccione travelled extensively in the early 15th century. In Autumn 1408 he went to England, where he sought to persuade the English as per the summons of the College of Cardinals to send a delegation to the Council of Pisa then struggling to put an end to the Western Schism. He convinced the English, but the council did nothing but exacerbate the schism.

From England, Uguccione, accompanied by his secretary Pey Berland went to Italy and in 1410 the archbishop rewarded Berland with one of the canonries of Bordeaux Cathedral. In 1412 the two were in Florence when Uguccione died. Berland supervised his burial and then went on a pilgrimage to the Holy Land before returning once more to Bordeaux. He was buried at Santa Francesca Romana, next to the tomb of Pope Gregory XI by his own request.

In 1413, Berland was rewarded post mortem by his old master when Pope John XXIII, fulfilling a request by Uguccione that "his beloved servant" Berland not be forgotten, granted the canon a prebend. Uguccione was succeeded as archbishop by David de Montferrand.
