= Archdiocese of Bordeaux =

Archdiocese in France

Coordinates: 44.84°N 0.58°W

Archdiocese of Bordeaux (–Bazas) Archidioecesis Burdigalensis (–Bazensis): Archidiocèse de Bordeaux (–Bazas); Archidiocèsi de Bordèu (–Vasats)

Catholic
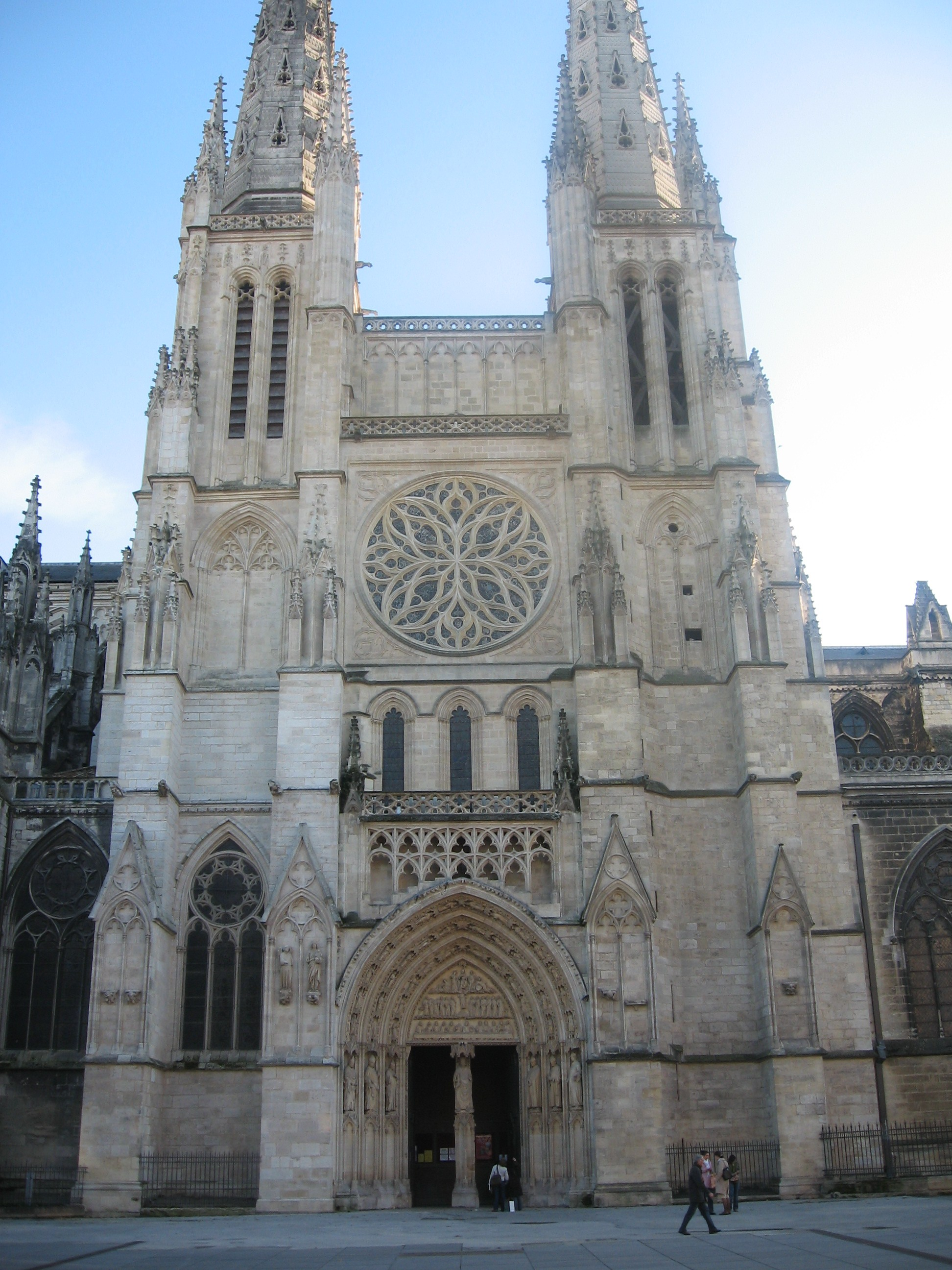
- Bordeaux Cathedral

Location
- Country: France
- Ecclesiastical province: Bordeaux

Statistics
- Area: 10,000 km^{2} (3,900 sq mi)
- Population: Total; Catholics: (as of 2022); 1,681,330; 1,076,000 (64%)
- Parishes: 587

Information
- Denomination: Catholic Church
- Sui iuris church: Latin Church
- Rite: Roman Rite
- Established: 3rd Century
- Cathedral: Cathedral of St. Andrew in Bordeaux
- Patron saint: St. Andrew
- Secular priests: 161 (Diocesan); 53 (Religious Orders)

Current leadership
- Pope: Leo XIV
- Archbishop: Jean-Paul James
- Suffragans: Diocese of Agen; Diocese of Aire; Diocese of Bayonne; Diocese of Périgueux
- Auxiliary Bishops: Jean-Marie Le Vert
- Bishops emeritus: Jean-Pierre Ricard

Map

Website
- bordeaux.catholique.fr

Ecclesiastical province of Bordeaux

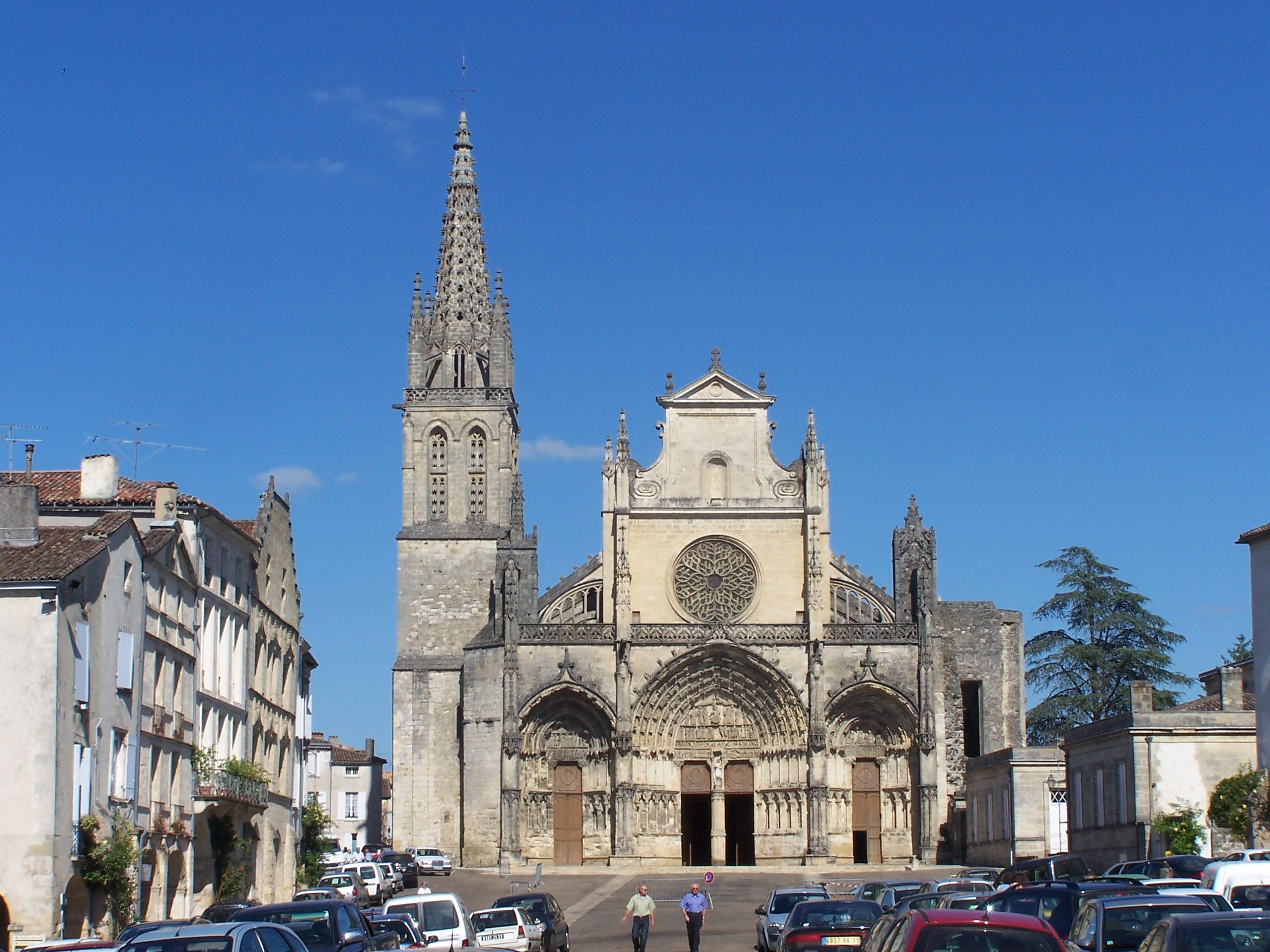
Former cathedral of St. John the Baptist at Bazas.

The Archdiocese of Bordeaux (–Bazas) (Latin: Archidioecesis Burdigalensis (–Bazensis); French: Archidiocèse de Bordeaux (–Bazas); Occitan: Archidiocèsi de Bordèu (–Vasats)) is a Latin Church ecclesiastical territory or archdiocese of the Catholic Church in France. The episcopal seat is Bordeaux Cathedral, Aquitaine. It was established under the Concordat of 1802 by combining the ancient Diocese of Bordeaux (diminished by the cession of part to the Bishopric of Aire) with the greater part of the suppressed Diocese of Bazas. The Archdiocese of Bordeaux is a metropolitan see, with four suffragan dioceses in its ecclesiastical province: Dioceses of Agen, Aire and Dax, Bayonne, and Périgueux.

== History ==
Constituted by the same Concordat metropolitan to the suffragan Bishoprics of Angoulême, Poitiers and La Rochelle, the see of Bordeaux received in 1822, as additional suffragans, those of Agen, withdrawn from the metropolitan of Toulouse, and the newly re-established Périgueux and Luçon.

In 1850, three (then colonial) Bishoprics of Fort-de-France (Martinique), Guadeloupe and Basse-Terre (Guadeloupe), and Saint-Denis de la Réunion (Réunion), were added.

Since 2002, the province of Bordeaux (corresponding historically with Aquitania Secunda) has been substantially modified following the abolition of the province of Auch and the creation of that of Poitiers.

=== Early history ===
According to old Limousin legends which date back to the beginning of the eleventh century, Bordeaux was evangelized in the first century by Saint Martial (Martialis), who replaced a temple to the unknown god, which he destroyed, with one dedicated to Saint Stephen. The same legends represent Martial as having brought to the Soulac coast Saint Veronica, who is still especially venerated in the church of Notre-Dame de Fin des Terres at Soulac; as having cured Sigebert, the paralytic husband of the pious Benedicta, and made him Bishop of Bordeaux, and as having addressed letters in Latin to the people of Bordeaux, where he left the pastoral staff now treasured as a relic by the Chapter of Saint-Seurin.

The first Bishop of Bordeaux known to history, Orientalis, is mentioned at the Council of Arles (314). By the close of the fourth century Christianity had made such progress in Bordeaux that a synod was held there (384), summoned by the Emperor Maximus, for the purpose of adopting measures against the Priscillianists, whose heresy had caused popular disturbances.

This was during the episcopate of Delphinus of Bordeaux (380–404), who attended the Council of Saragossa in 380, and maintained correspondence with St. Ambrose and with St. Paulinus of Nola.

At the beginning of the 5th century, a mysterious figure, who according to Saint Gregory of Tours came from the East, appeared in Bordeaux: Severinus (Seurin), in whose favour Bishop Amand abdicated the see from 410 to 420, resuming it after Seurin's death and occupying it until 432.

In the 6th century, Bordeaux had as its bishop Leontius II (542–564), a man of great influence who used his wealth in building churches and clearing lands and whom the poet Fortunatus calls patriae caput.

During this Merovingian period the cathedral church, founded in the fourth century, occupied the same site that it does today, tight against the ramparts of the ancient city. The Faubourg Saint-Seurin outside the city was a great centre of popular devotion, with its three large basilicas of Saints Stephen, Seurin, and Martin surrounding a large necropolis from which a certain number of sarcophagi are still preserved. The cemetery of Saint Seurin was full of tombs of the Merovingian (early dark ages) period around which the popular imagination was to create legends. In the high noon of the Middle Ages, it used to be told how Christ had consecrated this cemetery and that Charlemagne, having fought the Saracens near Bordeaux, had visited it and laid Roland's wonderful horn Olivant/Oliphant on the altar of Seurin.

Dessus l'autel de Saint Seurin le baron, Il met l'oliphant plein d'or et de mangons

translation:

On the altar of Saint Seurin the baron, it put the oliphant full of gold and of gold coins Song of Roland

Many tombs passed for those of Charlemagne's gallant knights and others were honored as the resting-places of Veronica and Benedicta. At the other extremity of the city, Benedictines drained and filled in the marshes of L'Eau-Bourde and founded there the monastery of Sainte-Croix. While thus surrounded by evidence of Christian conquest, the academic Bordeaux of the Merovingian period continued to cherish the memory of its former school of eloquence, whose chief glories had been the poet Ausonius (310–395) and St Paulinus (353–431), who had been a rhetorician at Bordeaux and died Bishop of Nola.

=== Middle Ages ===
During the whole 8th century and part of the 9th, no bishops are mentioned for Bordeaux among Vatican and local records. Frotharius was archbishop in 870, when he fled the city in the face of Viking raids.

In the late tenth century, ecclesiastical power was once again concentrated in the hands of the archbishop of Bordeaux when Gombald, brother of William II of Gascony and bishop of all the Gascon sees became archbishop (989). In 1027, the duke of Gascony, Sancho VI, and the duke of Aquitaine, William V, joined together to select Geoffrey II, an Aquitanian Frank, as archbishop. This represented a new ecumenical rôle for the archbishop spanning both regions. The reigns of William VIII and William IX (1052–1127), were noted for the splendid development of Romanesque architecture in Bordeaux. Parts of the churches of Sainte-Croix and Saint-Seurin belong to that time, and the Cathedral of Saint-André was begun in 1096.

During the Middle Ages, a struggle between the metropolitan sees of Bordeaux and Bourges was brought about by the claims of the latter to the primacy of Aquitaine. This question has been closely investigated by modern scholars, and it has been ascertained that a certain letter from Nicholas I to Rodolfus, which purports to date the existence of the primacy of Bourges from the ninth century, is not authentic.

As the capital of the Roman province Aquitania prima, Bourges at an early date vaguely aspired to pre-eminence over the provinces of Aquitania secunda and Aquitania tertia and thus over Bordeaux and it was about 1073 that these aspirations were more formally asserted; between 1112 and 1126 the papacy acknowledged them, and in 1146, Pope Eugenius III confirmed the primacy of Pierre de la Chatre, Archbishop of Bourges, over Bordeaux.

In 1232, Gregory IX gave the Archbishop of Bourges, as patriarch [sic], the right to visit the province of Aquitaine, imposed upon the Archbishop of Bordeaux the duty of assisting, at least once, at the councils held by his "brother" of Bourges, and decided that appeals might be made from the former to the latter.

Occasionally however, as in 1240 and 1284, the Archbishops of Bourges came to Bordeaux, found the doors of the churches closed against them and answered with excommunication the solemn protests made by the Bordeaux clergy against their visits.

Aquitaine was lost to France by the annulment of the marriage between Louis VII and Eleanor of Aquitaine (that earlier took place in the Cathedral of Bordeaux in 1137), and Bordeaux became the capital of the English possessions in France.

Thereupon the struggle between the metropolitans of Bordeaux and Bourges assumed a political character, the King of France necessarily upholding the claims of Bourges. Most of the archbishops were conspicuous as agents of English policy in Aquitaine, notably: Guillaume Amanieu (1207–26), on whom King Henry III conferred the title of seneschal and guardian of all his lands beyond the sea, and who took part in Spain in the wars against the (Muslim) Saracens; Gerard de Mallemort (1227–60), a generous founder of monasteries, who acted as mediator between Louis IX of France and Henry III, and defended Gascony against Simon de Montfort, 5th Earl of Leicester.

During the episcopate of Gerard de Mallemort the old Romanesque church of Saint-André was transformed into a Gothic cathedral.

Pope Clement V (1305–14) was unfavourable to the claims of Bourges. He was born in Villandraut near Bazas, where he had built a beautiful collegiate church, and was Archbishop of Bordeaux (and political adviser to King Philip the Fair) from 1300-05. When he became pope, in spite of sympathies to France proper, his heart was set upon the formal emancipation of Bordeaux from Bourges. By the late fourteenth century, archbishops such as Francesco Uguccione, were supporters of the English.

Pierre Berland (1430–57), Archbishop of Bordeaux, was noted for his intelligence and holiness. He founded the University of Bordeaux and the College of Saint Raphael for poor students. After helping the English to defend Bordeaux against the troops of Charles VII of France, he later received John of Orléans, Count of Dunois, into his episcopal city and surrendered it to France. It was during his episcopate that the beautiful campanile known as the Pey Berland Tower was added to the cathedral.

The rich and powerful canons of the Churches of Saint-André and Saint-Seurin engaged in frequent and animated conflicts. The artistic investment of the canons of these churches in the thirteenth century is attested by the Gothic portal of Saint-Seurin which is still extant. At the end of the fourteenth century, Vital de Carle established the Hospital of Saint-André, which he placed under the protection of the municipality. It was through the exertions of the Cathedral Chapter of Saint-André that the first city library of Bordeaux was founded around 1402.

During the Middle Ages Bordeaux added Carmelite, Franciscan, and Dominican convents, founded respectively in 1217, 1227, and 1230.

When, after the Hundred Years' War, Bordeaux came under French control (1453), Louis XI flattered its citizens by joining the confraternity of Notre-Dame de Montuzet, a religious association formed of all the mariners of the Gironde by heaping favours on the church of Saint-Michel, the tower of which, built in the period between 1473 and 1492, was higher than the Pey Berland, and by furthering the canonization of its former archbishop, Pierre Berland.

=== Councils and synods ===
In 1214, an important church council was held in Bordeaux by Cardinal Robert de Corzon, the Papal Legate in France, against usurers, highwaymen, and heretics.

A council in Bordeaux in 1215 arranged a peace between Gaillard d'Autorna and Guillaume Gombadi, abbot of Saint Croix.

A diocesan synod, held on 13 April 1255 by Archbishop Gerard de Malemort, legislated mostly on matters of clerical discipline, relics, and taxation.

In 1262, Archbishop Pierre de Roncevault held a diocesan synod which produced seven rulings, four of them on dealing with excommunication, and the others on burial (forbidding one parish priest from burying the dead of another parish), confirmation (giving proper notice), and marriage (clandestine marriages bringing excommunication to the ministers, contracting parties, and witnesses).

In 1583 Archbishop Antoine le Prévost de Sansac held a provincial council which produced thirty-six canons, similar to those which were being issued in other French ecclesiastical provinces, enacting decrees of the Council of Trent, especially as relating to the proper operation of seminaries in each diocese.

A provincial council was held at Bordeaux by Cardinal de Sourdis in 1624.

== List of Archbishops of Bordeaux ==
=== to 1100 ===
- Orientalis (fl. 314), participant in the Council of Arles
- Delphinus (380–404)
- Amandus (404–410 and 420)
- Severinus (410), sometimes confounded with Severinus of Cologne
- Gallicinus (post 451)
- Aemilius (post 475)
- Cyprian (485–511)
- Leontius I (post 520)
- Leontius II (542–564), participant in the Council of Paris
- Bertram (566 – post 585)
- Gundigisil (589)
- [Nicasius (7th–8th centuries)] (Note: His identity as bishop of Bordeaux is in doubt. Bishop Nicasius of Angoulême was a fellow bishop of Gundegisel of Bordeaux. Martha Gail Jenks (1999). From Queen to Bishop: A Political Biography of Radegund of Poiters. University of California, Berkeley. He was present at the Council of Mâcon in 585 with Bishop Bertechramnus: De Clercq, p. 249. Fisquet, p. 55.)
- Arnegisel (attested 614)
- Ioannes (c. 673/675)

[Antonius (7th–8th centuries)] (Note: His identity as bishop of Bordeaux is in doubt. Gams, p. 519 column 2, assigns him to Angoulême. Fisquet, p. 54.)
[Fronto (7th–8th centuries)] (Note: His identity as bishop of Bordeaux is in doubt. Gams, p. 519 column 2, assigns him to Angoulême.)
Verebulphus (769) (Note: His identity as bishop of Bordeaux is somewhat in doubt. A manuscript of Verona, published by Gaetano Cenni in 1735, reporting on the Roman council of 769, lists Verabulpo Episcopo Burtevulgo. J. D. Mansi (ed.) Tomus XII, p. 715; Gams, p. 519 column 2. Albert Werminghoff, in Monumenta Germaniae historica: Concilia. Legum sectio III (in German and Latin). Vol. Tomus II, Pars I. Hannover-Leipzig: Hahn. 1906. p. 80., suggests that he was Berohelpos, Bishop of Wirsburg.)

- Sicarius (814, 816 – post 825)
- Adalelmus (829 – post 848)
- Frothar (860–76)
- Adelbert (post 940)
- Geoffrey I (post 982)
- Gombald (989 – post 998)
- Seguin (post 1000)
- Arnold (1022)
- Islo (1022–1026)
- Geoffrey II (1027–1043)
- Archambaud de Parthenay (1047–1059)

[Andron (1059)]

- Joscelin de Parthenay (1060 – 19 June 1086)
- Amatus (1089 – 22 May 1101)

=== from 1100 to 1400 ===
- Arnaud Géraud de Cabanac (1103 – 29 April 1131)
- Gérard d'Angoulême (de Blaye) (1131–1135), usurper
- Geoffrey III (1136 – 18 July 1158)
- Raimond de Mareuil (1158– 23 December 1159)
- Hardouin (1160 – 4 July 1162)
- Bertrand de Montault (July 1162 – 18 December 1173)
- Guillaume I (1173–1187)
- Hélie de Malemort (1188–1207)
- Guillaume II (1207 – 13 September 1227)
- Géraud de Malemort (1227–1261)
- Pierre de Roncevault (23 March 1262 – 11 January 1270)

Sede Vacante (1270 – 4 September 1275)

- Simon de Rochechouart (4 September 1275 – 1280)
- Guillaume III (1285–c.1287)
- Henri de Genève (25 July 1289 – April 1297)

Boson de Salignac (after April 1297 – 22 December 1299)

- Raymond Bertrand de Got (23 December 1299 – 5 June 1305), future Pope Clement V
- Arnaud de Canteloup, senior (1305)
- Arnaud de Canteloup, junior (28 July 1306 – 26 March 1332)
- Pierre de Luc (13 May 1332 – 1345)
- Amanieu de Cazes (19 January 1347 – 1348)
- Bernard de Cazes (17 September 1348 – 1351)
- Amanieu de La Mothe (28 September 1351 – 27 June 1360)
- Philippe de Chambarlhac (21 July 1360 – May/June 1361)
- Hélie de Salignac (24 September 1361 – 7 May 1378)
- Guillaume Bruni (11 February 1379 – after 1411) (Avignon Obedience)
- Raimond Bernard de Roqueis (1380 – 15 March 1384) (Roman Obedience)
- Francesco Uguccione (1384–1412), cardinal (Roman Obedience)

=== from 1400 to 1700 ===
- Jean de Montferrand (1 July 1409 – 1410)
- David de Montferrand (1413–1430)
- Pey Berland (16 October 1430 – 1456)
- Blaise Régnier de Gréelle (24 September 1456 – 1467)
- Arthur de Montauban (11 January 1465 – March 1478)
- André d'Espinay (28 April 1479 – 10 November 1500)
- Jean de Foix (9 December 1501 – 25 June 1529)
- Gabriel de Gramont (1529–1530)
- Charles de Gramont (9 March 1530 – 1544)
- Jean du Bellay (17 December 1544 – 1553) (Administrator)

Jean de Montluc (3 July 1551 – 1553)

- François de Mauny (13 September 1553 – 1558)
- Cardinal Jean du Bellay (1558–1560) (Administrator)
- Antoine Prévost de Sansac (4 September 1560 – 17 October 1591)
- Jean Le Breton (1592–1599)
- Cardinal François d'Escoubleau de Sourdis (5 July 1599 – 18 June 1628)
- Henri d'Escoubleau de Sourdis (1629 – 18 June 1645)
- Henri de Béthune (1646 – 11 May 1680)
- Louis d'Anglure de Bourlemont (6 September 1680 – 9 November 1697)
- Armand Bazin de Bezons (1698-1719)

=== since 1700 ===
- François Élie de Voyer de Paulmy d'Argenson (1719-1728)
- François Honoré de Casaubon de Maniban (1729-1743)
- Louis-Jacques d'Audibert de Lussan (1743-1769)
- Ferdinand de Rohan-Guémené (26 December 1769 – 28 January 1781)
- Jérôme-Marie Champion de Cicé (28 January 1781 – 8 October 1801)

- Pierre Pacareau (14 March 1791 – 1797) (Constitutional Metropolitan of 'Sud-Ouest')
- Dominique Lacombe (24 December 1797 – 1801) (Constitutional Metropolitan)

- Charles-François d'Aviau Du Bois de Sanzay (9 April 1802 – 11 July 1826)
- Jean-Louis Lefebvre de Cheverus (30 July 1826 – 19 July 1836)
- François Donnet (30 November 1836 – 23 December 1882)
- Aimé-Victor-François Guilbert (5 June 1883 – 15 August 1889)
- Victor-Lucien-Sulpice Lécot (3 June 1890 – 19 December 1908)
- Pierre Andrieu (2 January 1909 – 14 February 1935)
- Maurice Feltin (16 December 1935 – 15 August 1949)
- Paul Marie André Richaud (10 February 1950 – 5 February 1968)
- Marius Maziers (5 February 1968 – 31 May 1989)
- Pierre Eyt (31 May 1989 – 11 June 2001 )
- Jean-Pierre Ricard (21 December 2001 – 1 October 2019)
- Jean-Paul James (14 November 2019 – present)

== See also ==
- Catholic Church in France

== Notes and references ==
Notes

== Sources ==
=== Reference works ===
- Gams, Pius Bonifatius (1873). Series episcoporum Ecclesiae catholicae: quotquot innotuerunt a beato Petro apostolo. Ratisbon: Typis et Sumptibus Georgii Josephi Manz. (Use with caution; obsolete)
- Eubel, Conradus, ed. (1913). Hierarchia catholica, Tomus 1 (second ed.). Münster: Libreria Regensbergiana. (in Latin)
- Eubel, Conradus, ed. (1914). Hierarchia catholica, Tomus 2 (second ed.). Münster: Libreria Regensbergiana. (in Latin)
- Gulik, Guilelmus (1923). Eubel, Conradus (ed.). Hierarchia catholica, Tomus 3 (second ed.). Münster: Libreria Regensbergiana.
- Gauchat, Patritius (Patrice) (1935). Hierarchia catholica IV (1592-1667). Münster: Libraria Regensbergiana.
- Ritzler, Remigius; Sefrin, Pirminus (1952). Hierarchia catholica medii et recentis aevi V (1667-1730). Patavii: Messagero di S. Antonio.
- Ritzler, Remigius; Sefrin, Pirminus (1958). Hierarchia catholica medii et recentis aevi VI (1730-1799). Patavii: Messagero di S. Antonio.
- Ritzler, Remigius; Sefrin, Pirminus (1968). Hierarchia Catholica medii et recentioris aevi sive summorum pontificum, S. R. E. cardinalium, ecclesiarum antistitum series... A pontificatu Pii PP. VII (1800) usque ad pontificatum Gregorii PP. XVI (1846) (in Latin). Vol. VII. Monasterii: Libr. Regensburgiana.
- Remigius Ritzler; Pirminus Sefrin (1978). Hierarchia catholica Medii et recentioris aevi... A Pontificatu PII PP. IX (1846) usque ad Pontificatum Leonis PP. XIII (1903) (in Latin). Vol. VIII. Il Messaggero di S. Antonio.
- Pięta, Zenon (2002). Hierarchia catholica medii et recentioris aevi... A pontificatu Pii PP. X (1903) usque ad pontificatum Benedictii PP. XV (1922) (in Latin). Vol. IX. Padua: Messagero di San Antonio. ISBN 978-88-250-1000-8.

=== Studies ===
- Duchesne, Louis (1910). Fastes épiscopaux de l'ancienne Gaule: II. L'Aquitaine et les Lyonnaises. Paris: Fontemoing. pp. 59–62.
- Du Tems, Hugues (1774). Le clergé de France, ou tableau historique et chronologique des archevêques, évêques, abbés, abbesses et chefs des chapitres principaux du royaume, depuis la fondation des églises jusqu'à nos jours (in French). Vol. Tome premier. Paris: Delalain.
- Jean, Armand (1891). Les évêques et les archevêques de France depuis 1682 jusqu'à 1801 (in French). Paris: A. Picard. p. 78.
- Devienne, Charles, OSB (1862). Histoire de l'église de Bordeaux (in French). Paris: Lecoffre.
- Fisquet, Honoré Jean P. (1864). La France pontificale ... Bordeaux (in French). Paris: E. Repos.
- Guillemain, Bernard; Darricau, Raymond; Marquette, Jean-Bernard (1974). Le diocèse de Bordeaux (in French). Paris: Editions Beauchesne. GGKEY:AQCWP5YABNX.
- Lainé, Françoise (ed.) (2012): Fasti Ecclesiae Gallicanae. Répertoire prosopographique des évêques, dignitaires et chanoines des diocèses de France de 1200 à 1500. XIII. Diocèse de Bordeaux. Turnhout, Brepols (in French)
- Sainte-Marthe, Denis de (1720). Gallia Christiana: In Provincias Ecclesiasticas Distributa... Provinciae Burdigalensis, Bituricensis (in Latin). Vol. Tomus secundus. Paris: Typographia Regia.
- Société bibliographique (France) (1907). L'épiscopat français depuis le Concordat jusqu'à la Séparation (1802-1905). Paris: Librairie des Saints-Pères.
