= Roman Catholic Diocese of Dax =

Former Roman Catholic diocese in France

Coordinates: 43.71°N 1.05°W

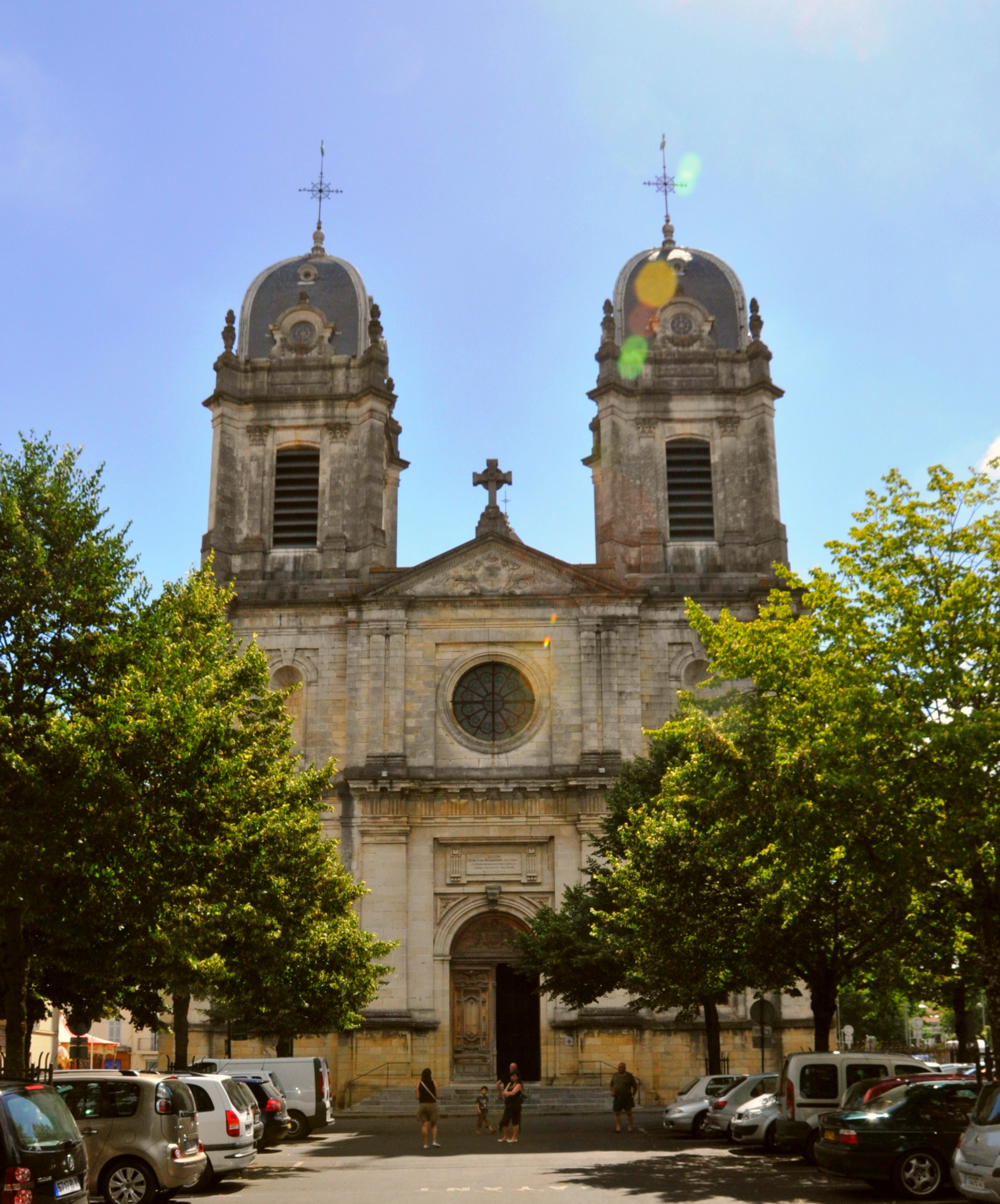
Cathedral of S. Vincent, Dax

The Diocese of Dax or Acqs was a Roman Catholic ecclesiastical territory in Gascony in south-west France. According to tradition it was established in the 5th century. It was suppressed after the French Revolution, by the Concordat of 1801 between First Consul Napoleon Bonaparte and Pope Pius VII. Its territory now belongs to the Diocese of Aire and Diocese of Bayonne.

== History ==
It is not certain that the patron of the diocese, the martyr St. Vincent, was a bishop. His cult, at least, existed in the time of Charlemagne, as is proved by a note (in a later hand) of the Wolfenbüttel manuscript of the Hieronymian Martyrology. The oldest account of his martyrdom is in a breviary of Dax, dating from the second half of the thirteenth century, but the author knows nothing of the martyr's time period or the reasons for his death.

Excavations near Dax proved the existence of a Merovingian cemetery on the site of a church which, it is claimed, was dedicated to St. Vincent by Bishop Gratianus. Gratianus, present at the Council of Agde (506), is the first historically known bishop. Among the other bishops of the see were St. Revellatus (early sixth century), St. Macarius (c. 1060), Cardinal Pierre Itier (1361), Cardinal Pierre de Foix (1455), founder of the University of Avignon and the Collège de Foix at Toulouse.

The synodal constitutions of the ancient Diocese of Dax, published by Abbé Antoine Degert, are of great historical interest for the study of the ancient constitutions and customs of the thirteenth and fourteenth centuries. Degert in the course of this publication succeeded in rectifying certain errors in the episcopal lists of the Gallia christiana and of Father Eubel in Hierarchia catholica.

During the Great Schism, Dax, which was part of Aquitaine, belonged to the Kings of England (in 1378 Richard II). King Richard chose to support the popes of the Roman Obedience rather than the popes of the Avignon Obedience, who were French and likely to support the King of France in what is now called the Hundred Years' War. All of the cardinals of the Avignon obedience were deprived of their offices and benefices in the Kingdom of Richard II of England, by act of Parliament and decree of the King Dax was required to adhere to the Obedience of Rome.

About 1588 St. Vincent de Paul made his first studies with the Cordeliers of Dax, but good secondary education at Dax dates only from the establishment of the Barnabites in 1640. His learning, however, was sufficient to allow him to study at the University of Toulouse.

On 3 June 1857, the title "Bishop of Dax" was added to the titulature of the Bishop of Aire.

== Bishops of Dax ==
=== Early bishops ===
- Vincentius
- Gratianus
- Carterius (541)
- Liberius (549)
- Faustianus
- Nicetius
- Illidius
- Revelatus

Sede Vacante (lasting nearly four centuries, due to Arab invasions and Northmen, until ca. 850)

- Oltherius (second half of ninth century)

=== Bishops of Gascony ===
- Gombaud (end of tenth century)
- Arsius-Raca
- Raymond
- Raymond

=== Bishops of Dax, 1000–1200 ===
- Macarius (ca. 1061)
- Gregory de Montaner, O.S.B. ( –1068)
- Bernard de Mugron, O.S.B. (by 1068 – 25 July 1097)
- Raymond de Sentes (before 1100 – 28 March 1117)
- Guillaume de Heugas (1117–1143)
- Arnaud-Guillaume de Sort (ca. 1143 – after 20 November 1167)
- Guillaume Bertrand (ca. 1168–1203)

=== 1200–1400 ===
- ? Jean de Caunar (1203)
- Fortanerius de Mauléon (1204 – February 1215)
- Guilelmus de Salies (1217 – October 1233)
- Arnaud Raymond de Tartas (1234–?)
- Navarre de Miossenx, O.Cist. (1239 – 3 November 1272)

Sede Vacante (1272–1278)

- Arnaud de Ville (5 April 1278 – 11 March 1305)
- Garsias Arnaud de Capenne (1305, before 12 September – 8 January 1327)
- Bernard de Liposse (19 January 1327 – February 1359)
- Pierre la Colre (15 March–15 April 1359)
- Pierre Itier (10 May 1359 – 1362) (resigned on becoming Cardinal)
- Bernard d'Albret [de Lebreto], O.Min. (Bishop-elect) (1 June–?, 1362)
- Jean de Saya (18 January 1363 – 8 June 1375) (transferred to Agen)
- Jean de Hanecourt [or Haricuria] (bishop-elect, died before consecration) (9 June–August 1375)
- Jean Bauffès (27 August 1375 – 4 December 1391) (transferred to Vich)
- Joannes Guterii (Obedience of Rome) (March 1380 – late in 1393)
- Pierre Troselli, O.P. (Obedience of Avignon) (4 December 1391 – 9 March 1405? or 1412?)
- Pierre du Bosc (Obedience of Rome) (5 December 1393 – 19 June 1400)

=== 1400–1600 ===
- Petrus Ameil de Brénac, O.E.S.A., Patriarch of Alexandria (Obedience of Rome), Administrator of Dax (19 June 1400 – 4 May 1401)
- Garsias-Arnaud de Navailhes (Obedience of Rome) (4 May 1401 – 1407)
- Pélegrin du Fau (1407 – 22 July 1408)
- Petrus de Anglada, O.P. (Obedience of Rome) (23 August 1409 – 1423)
- Nicolaus Duriche, O.P. (Obedience of Avignon) (27 May 1412 – 1423)
- Francesco Piccolpasso (29 March 1423 – 26 February 1427) (transferred to Pavia)
- Bernard de la Planche (26 February 1427 – 1439) (deposed, as a supporter of Antipope Felix V)
- Garsias Arnaldi de Sega (de l'Exègne) (25 September 1439 – 9 December 1444)
- Beltrandus (1445? – 5 July 1451) (transferred to the diocese of Oloron)
- Pierre de Foix, O.Min. (5 July 1451 – 30 May 1459)
- Jean de Foix (1459 – 9 May 1466) (transferred to Comminges)
- Bertrand de Borie (12 May 1466 – 1499)
- Arnaldus (Garsias Arnaud) de Borie (8 April 1499 – 1501)
- Petrus de Caupena (6 February 1502 – 1514)
- Jean de la Martonie (1514–1519)
- Gaston de la Martonie (1 April 1519 – October 1555)
- François de Noailles (28 September 1556 – 1562) (resigned)
- Gilles (Aegidius) de Noailles (1562–1600) resigned

=== 1600–1801 ===
- Jean-Jacques du Sault (25 May 1598 – 25 May 1623)
- Philibert du Sault (25 May 1623 – 11 November 1638)
- Jacques Desclaux (11 April 1639 – 4 April 1658)
- Guillaume Le Boux, Orat. (26 May 1659 – 15 December 1666) (transferred to Périgueux)
- Hugues de Bar (7 March 1667 – 1671) (transferred to Lectoure)
- Paul-Philippe de Chaumont Quitry (14 December 1671 – 1684)
  - Leo de La Lanne
  - Jean Marie de Prugues
- Bernard d'Abbadie d'Arbocave (5 May 1692 – 14 December 1732)
- François d'Andigné (2 September 1733 – 28 May 1736)
- Louis-Marie de Suarès d'Aulan (6 May 1737 – 23 January 1772)
- Charles-Auguste Le Quien de La Neufville (27 January 1772 – 24 October 1801)
  - Jean-Jacques Saurine (Constitutional Bishop of Landes and Basses-Pyrénées) (1791–1802)

== See also ==
- Catholic Church in France
- List of Catholic dioceses in France

== Books and articles ==
=== Reference books ===
- Gams, Pius Bonifatius (1873). Series episcoporum Ecclesiae catholicae: quotquot innotuerunt a beato Petro apostolo. Ratisbon: Typis et Sumptibus Georgii Josephi Manz. pp. 599–601. (Use with caution; obsolete)
- Eubel, Conradus, ed. (1913). Hierarchia catholica, Tomus 1 (second ed.). Münster: Libreria Regensbergiana. p. 97. (in Latin)
- Eubel, Conradus, ed. (1914). Hierarchia catholica, Tomus 2 (second ed.). Münster: Libreria Regensbergiana. p. 91.
- Eubel, Conradus, ed. (1923). Hierarchia catholica, Tomus 3 (second ed.). Münster: Libreria Regensbergiana.
- Gauchat, Patritius (Patrice) (1935). Hierarchia catholica IV (1592-1667). Münster: Libraria Regensbergiana. p. 89.
- Ritzler, Remigius; Sefrin, Pirminus (1952). Hierarchia catholica medii et recentis aevi V (1667-1730). Patavii: Messagero di S. Antonio. p. 93.
- Ritzler, Remigius; Sefrin, Pirminus (1958). Hierarchia catholica medii et recentis aevi VI (1730-1799). Patavii: Messagero di S. Antonio. pp. 92–93.

=== Studies ===
- Degert, Antoine (1899). Histoire des évêques de Dax (in French). Dax: H. Labèque.
- Dufourcet, Eugène (1879). "Les Évêques de Dax, depuis Saint Vincent de Sentes jusqu'à Mgr Le Quien de Laneufville". Bulletin de la Société de Borda. 4: 205–230.
- Pisani, Paul (1907). Répertoire biographique de l'épiscopat constitutionnel (1791-1802) (in French). Paris: A. Picard et fils.
- Sainte-Marthe, Denis de (O.S.B.) (1715). Gallia Christiana, In Provincias Ecclesiasticas Distributa; Qua Series Et Historia Archiepiscoporum, Episcoporum, Et Abbatum Franciae Vicinarumque Ditionum ab origine Ecclesiarum ad nostra tempora deducitur, & probatur ex authenticis Instrumentis ad calcem appositis: Tomus Primus (in Latin). Vol. Tomus primus. Paris: Johannes-Baptista Coignard, Regis & Academiae Gallicae Architypographus. pp. 1035–1070.
