= Avensan =

- Commune
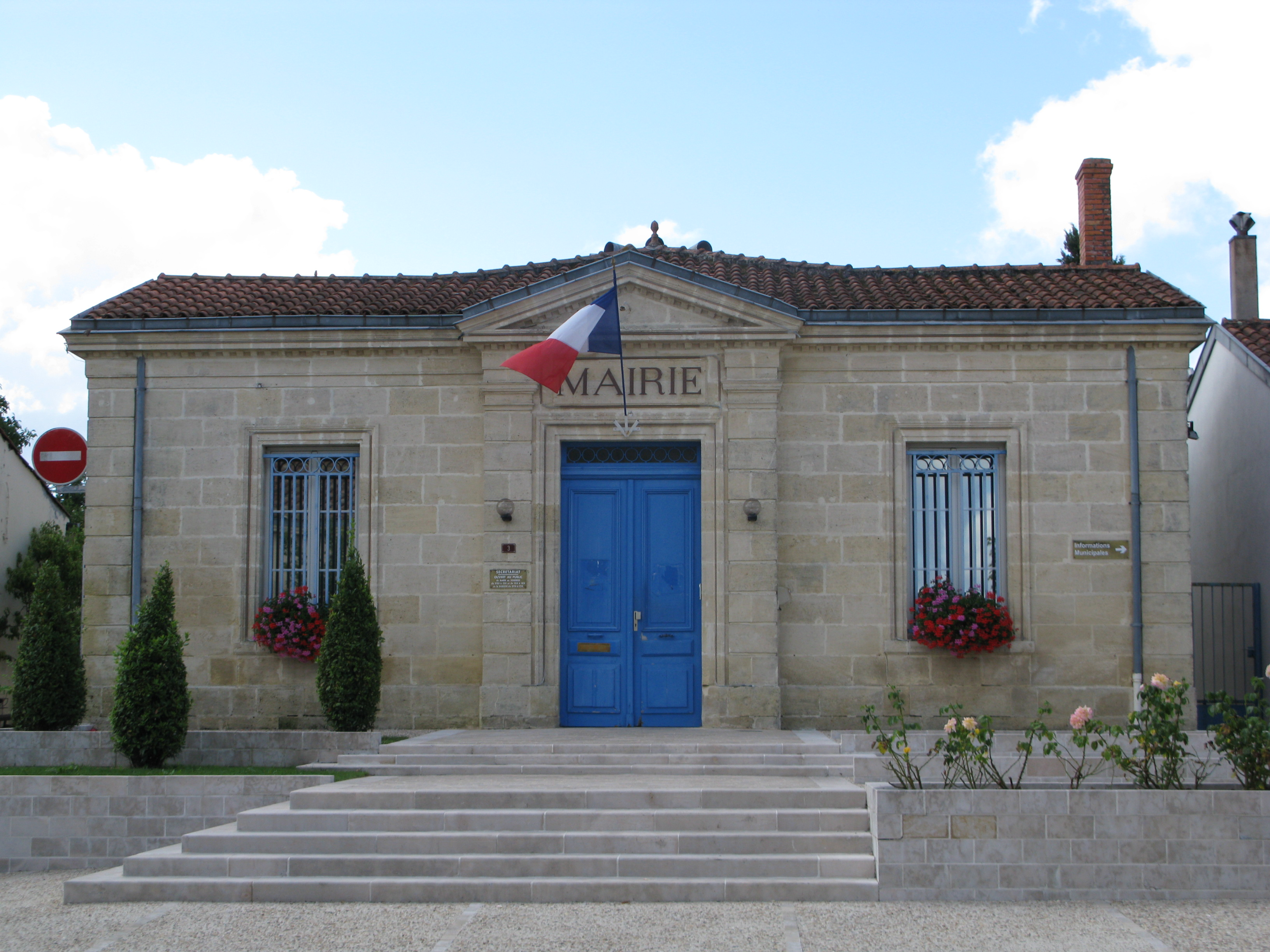
- Town hall
- Location of Avensan
- Location within France Location within Nouvelle-Aquitaine
- Coordinates: 45°02′08″N 0°45′24″W
- Country: France
- Region: Nouvelle-Aquitaine
- Department: Gironde
- Arrondissement: Lesparre-Médoc
- Canton: Le Sud-Médoc
- Intercommunality: CC Médullienne

Government
  - Mayor (2023–2026): Laurent Pascual
- Area^{1}: 52.24 km^{2} (20.17 sq mi)
- Elevation: 14 m (46 ft)
- Highest elevation: 51 m (167 ft)
- Lowest elevation: 4 m (13 ft)
- Population (2023): 3,140
  - Density: 60.1/km^{2} (156/sq mi)
- Time zone: UTC+01:00 (CET)
  - Summer (DST): UTC+02:00 (CEST)
- INSEE/Postal code: 33022 /33480
- ^{1} French Land Register data, which excludes lakes, ponds, glaciers > 1 km^{2} (0.386 sq mi or 247 acres) and river estuaries.

Avensan (French pronunciation: [avɑ̃sɑ̃]) is a commune in the Gironde department in southwestern France.

== Population ==
Historical population
Year	Pop.	±% p.a.
1968	962	—
1975	1,062	+1.42%
1982	1,592	+5.95%
1990	1,620	+0.22%
1999	1,753	+0.88%
2007	2,095	+2.25%
2012	2,501	+3.61%
2017	2,953	+3.38%
2023	3,140	+1.03%
Source: INSEE

== See also ==
- Communes of the Gironde department
