= Ancient Diocese of Saintes =

Roman Catholic diocese in France (6 century - 1801)

Coordinates: 45.74°N 0.63°W

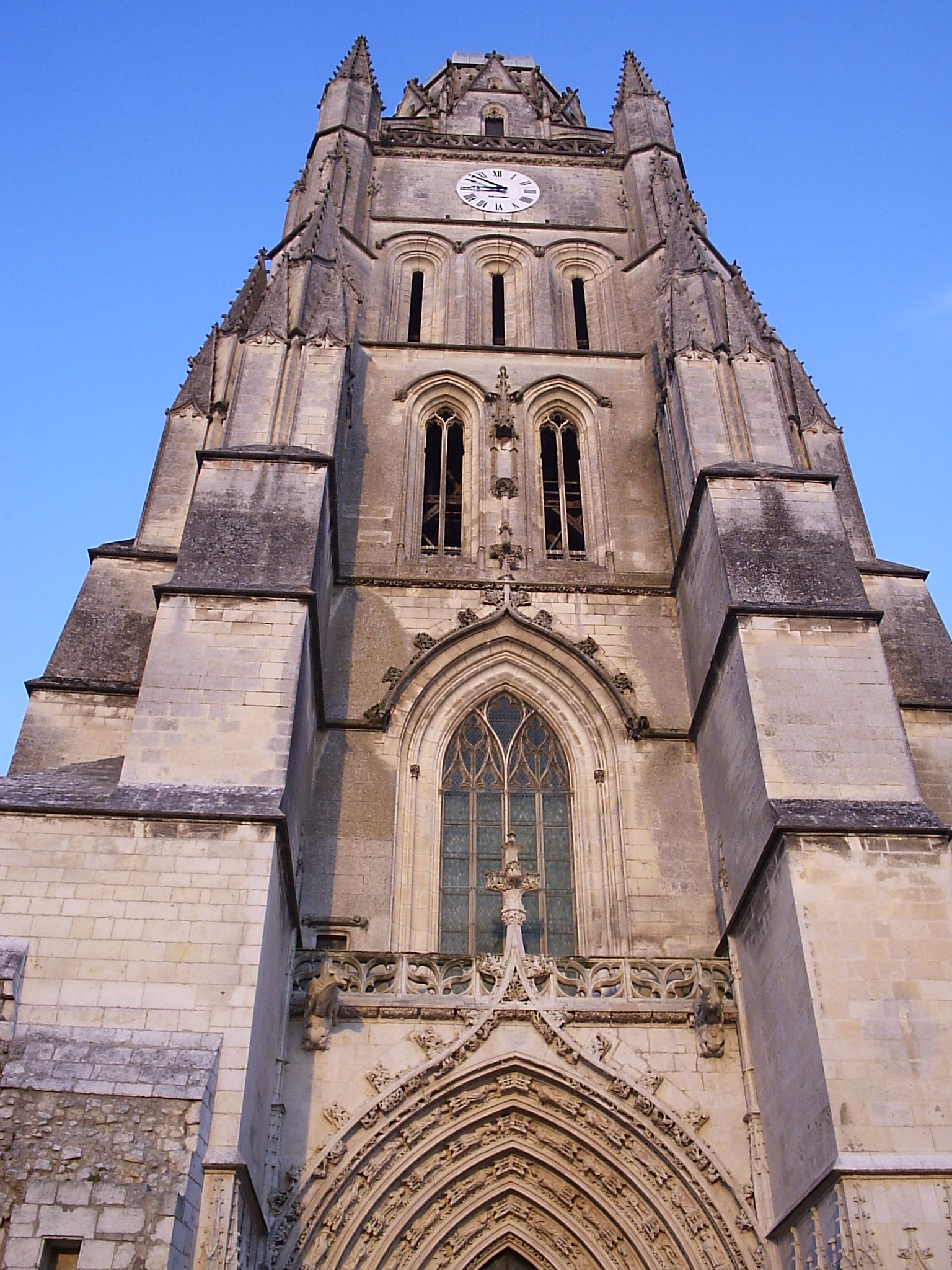
Saintes Cathedral

The former French diocese of Saintes existed from the 6th century to the French Revolution. Its bishops had their see in the cathedral of Saintes in western France, in the modern department of Charente-Maritime. After the Concordat of 1801, the diocese was abolished and its territory passed mainly to the Diocese of La Rochelle, the name of which was changed in 1862 to the present Diocese of La Rochelle and Saintes.

== History ==
Saintes has numerous Roman monuments, including a large amphitheater and an arch dedicated to Germanicus, the nephew of the Emperor Tiberius.

The earliest bishop to whom a date can be assigned is Bishop Peter, who took part in the Council of Orléans (511).

The first reference to a bishop, however, is to Eutropius. A poem written by Venantius Fortunatus in the second half of the sixth century makes explicit mention of Eutropius in connection with Saintes: Urbis Santonicae primus fuit iste sacerdos. A quite different tale is related, however, by Gregory of Tours, in his work De gloria martyrum (I. 56), with a cautious ut fertur ('as is said'), indicating Gregory's uncertainty regarding the historicity of the narrative. Eutropius was said to have been consecrated a bishop and sent to Gaul by Pope Clement I in the late first century; at Saintes he is said to have begun converting people to Christianity, but was killed by a blow to the head struck by enraged pagans. (He is later given a virgin companion, Eustella, the daughter of the local king, who pays the butchers of the town some 150 solidi apiece to kill Eutropius and Eustella.) Were this true, Saintes would be the only church of Gaul which Gregory traces back to the first century, though far from the only church which makes such a claim to antiquity. The evidence is much weakened, in the view of Louis Duchesne, by Gregory's remark that no one knew the history of Saint Eutropius before the transfer of his relics in about 590 to a church built in his honor by Bishop Palladius of Saintes. It is at this late date that the legend of Eutropius as a martyr seems to have begun.

Among the bishops of Saintes there are several popularly regarded as saints, including Vivianus, Trojanus, Concordius, Palladius, and Leontius (of the 5th to the 7th centuries). Other notable bishops include:

- Cardinal Raimond Perauld (1503–1505), an ecclesiastical writer, several times nuncio, legate for a crusade, against the infidels, and the re-establishment of peace between Maximilian and Louis XII
- Cardinal Francesco Soderini (1507–16), who died in Rome as dean of the Sacred College
- his nephew Giuliano Soderini (1516–1544)
- Charles, Cardinal de Bourbon (1544–1550), cardinal in 1548, afterward Archbishop of Rouen, whom Mayenne wished later to make King of France
- Tristan de Bizet (1550–1576), a native of Troyes and a monk of Clairvaux. Tristan was selected by Henry II of France to be his almoner. He was commendatory abbot of the Abbey of Saint-Nicholas-aux-Bois (in the diocese of Laon) from 1547/8 to 1574. At Saintes he was a vigorous reformer, vigilant against Protestant deviations among the secular clergy. He obtained a decree from Henry II assuring him powers of visitation over the abbeys, priories and benefices in his diocese. He took part in the Council of Trent.
- Pierre Louis de La Rochefoucauld (1782–1792), who had been a deputy to the National Assembly in 1789, was massacred at Paris in the church of the Carmelites along with his brother, François-Joseph, the Bishop of Beauvais, 2 September 1792.

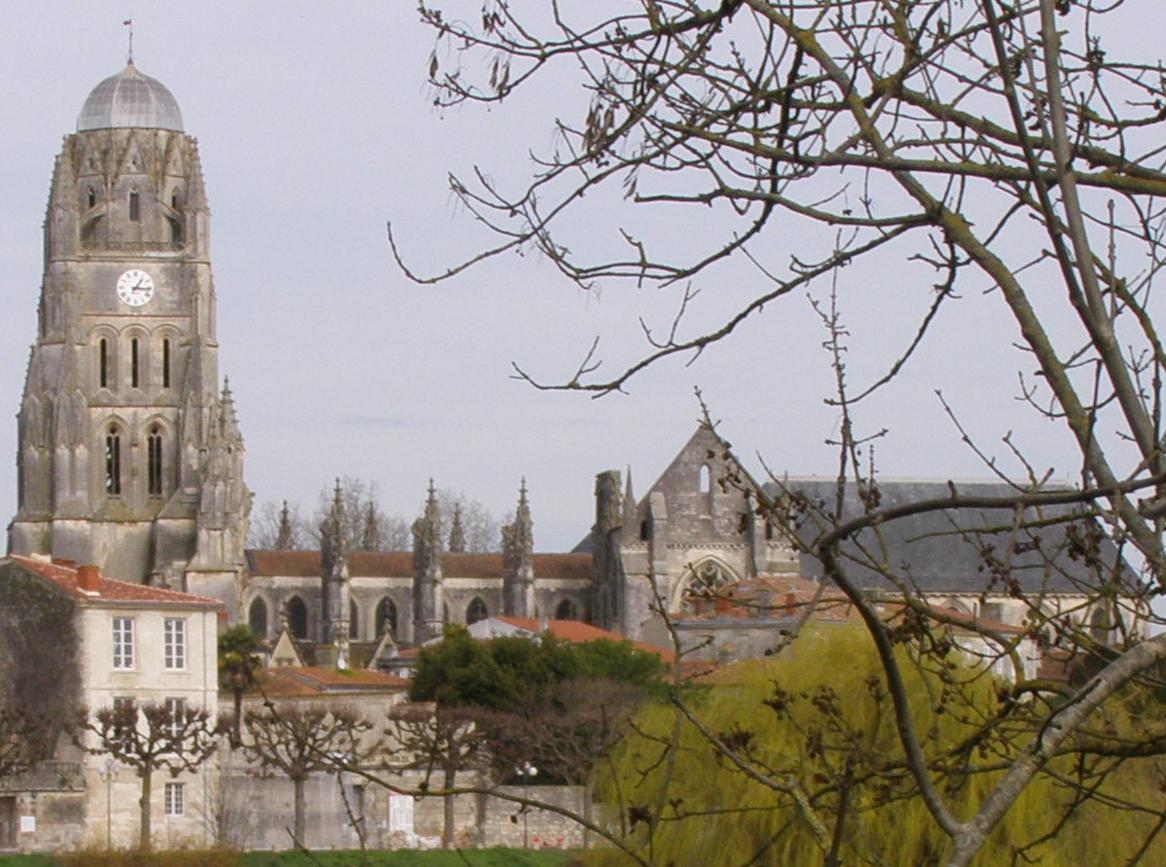
The cathedral, showing rebuilt parts and unreconstructed crossing

In 1568 during the French Wars of Religion the cathedral was almost entirely destroyed, except for the tower.

The cathedral chapter had five dignities: the dean, two archdeacons, the chancellor, and the precentor. Except for the dean, the dignities were appointed by the bishop. There were twenty-four prebends. In the early 13th century, when the future cathedral was still a collegiate church, Innocent III had to warn the chapter not to allow the number of canons to exceed forty.

During the French Revolution, when the Civil Constitution of the Clergy instituted a national church, and the nation was redivided into dioceses which matched as far as possible the civil departments into which the administration of the state was divided, the diocese of Saintes and the diocese of La Rochelle were combined into the Diocese of Charente-Inferieure. Both Bishop de La Rochefoucauld and Bishop de Coucy refused to take the oath of loyalty to the Civil Constitution, as required by law. They were therefore deposed. The electors of Charente-Infeurieure assembled on 27 February 1791 and elected Fr. Isaac-Étienne Robinet, the curé of Saint-Savinien-le-Port, as their Constitutional Bishop. He made his formal entry into Saintes on 31 March, and took formal possession of the cathedral on 10 April. He roused up the anti-clerical feelings of the populace against the non-jurors, but, once roused, they turned against all the clergy, including Robinet. In November 1793 the crypt of the cathedral was broken into, and the supposed relics of Saint Eutropius were thrown out of their tomb. Bishop Robinet resigned on 6 December 1793, and took up residence with his brother at Torxé, where he died on 8 September 1797.

As a result of the negotiations leading to the Concordat of 1801 between First Consul Napoleon Bonaparte and Pope Pius VII, the diocese of Saintes was suppressed.

On 19 May 1843 the supposed relics of Saint Eusebius were discovered in the crypt of the cathedral, and on 14 October 1845 they were solemnly translated to a new resting place.

On 22 January 1852, the title 'Bishop of Saintes' (though not the diocese itself) was revived by Pope Pius IX and conferred on the Bishop of La Rochelle, Clément Villecourt (1836–1856). The bishops of La Rochelle have enjoyed the additional episcopal title since that time.

== Councils ==
Several councils were held at Saintes. In 562 or 563, the Archbishop of Bordeaux held a provincial Council in Saintes, for the purpose of dealing with Bishop Emerius of Saintes, who had been elected uncanonically. Emerius was deposed by the council, and Heraclius, a priest of Bordeaux, appointed by the council in his place. Heraclius was then sent off to Paris to obtain recognition from Charibert, the new King of the Franks. The King, however, was greatly angered at the bishops, since his late father had ordered the consecration and installation of Emerius, whose deposition was therefore an insult to royal power. Heraclius was sent into exile. Archbishop Leontius of Bordeaux, who had presided at the council, was heavily fined, and additional fines were imposed on the other bishops as well.

Other councils or synods were held in 579, 1074 or 1075, and 1081. Synods were also held in 1083, 1088, 1089, and 2 March 1097.

== Bishops ==
=== to 1000 ===
- Eutropius (4th century)
- Benedict? (4th century)
- Palladius I? (4th century)
- Leontius? (4th centjury)
- Ambrose (beginning of 5th century)
- Vivianus (Vivien or Bibianus) (5th century)
- Concorde (5th century)
- Trojanus (late 5th century to beginning of 6th)
- Peter I (511)
- Eusebius (553–c.555)
- Emerius (before 561)
- Palladius (573–596)
- Leodegarius (beginning of seventh century)
- Audebertus (614)
- Leontius (625 to 627–634)
- Ailphus (637)
- Bertarius (660)
- Agnebertus (662–675)
- Ulric (end of the 7th century–beginning of 8th)
- Dizan (8th century)
- Benjamin (c.785)
- Ato (799)
- Thebertus (805)
- Frotmundus (c.846)
- Frecultus (862)
- Abbon (989–c.990)

=== 1000–1300 ===
- Islo (13 January 1000 – June 1031)
- Godefroy (1032–1036)
- Arnulfus (March 1037 or 1038–31 May 1040)
- Alo (1040–1043)
- Engebricus (1044–1047)
- Arnulfus (2 November 1047 – 1065)
- Goderanus (1067–6 August 1072)
- Boso (1072–1083)
- Ramnulfus Focaudi (October 1083–11 June 1106)
- Pierre II de Soubise (1106 or 1107–1112)
- Rainaldus Chainel (1112–1116)
- Pierre III de Confolens (1117–c.1126)
- William Gardradus (1127–9 November 1142)
- Bernard (1142–c.1165)
- Ademar Charbonnel (1167–1189)
- Helias I (August 1189)
- Henry of Poitou (1190–1217)
- Ponce de Pons (1216–1221)
- Michel I (1221)
- Helias II (1222–1231)
- John I (1231–1235)
- Peter IV (1235–1237)
- William III (1237–1239)
- Hélie III (1239–1241)
- Peter V (1241–1250)
- Hugues II de Féletz (1250–1256)
- Ponce II. de Pons (1257–1266)
- Helias IV de Fors (1266)
- Peter VI Laud (1267–1271)
- Ponce III de Pons (1271–1275)
- Peter VII (1275–1277)
- Geoffroy II de Saint-Briçon (1277–1284)
- Peter VIII (1284–1287)
- Gimer (1288)
- Geoffroy III d'Archiac (1288–1294)
- Ramnufle de Carel (1296)
- Guy de Neuville (1296–1312)

=== 1300–1500 ===
- Geoffroy IV (1313)
- William IV de La Mothe (1313–1322)
- Thibaud de Castillon (1322–1342)
- Etienne de La Garde (1343–1351) (Cardinal)
- Gaillard du Puy (1351–1361) (Cardinal)
- Bernard II du Sault (1362–1381) (Rome nomination)
- Raymond d'Angoulême (1380) (Avignon nomination)
- Helias V de Lestrange (1381–1396)
- Peter Mignot (1380–1397)
- Bernard III de Chevenon (1398–1413)
- Geoffroy de Pérusse des Cars (1411–1418)
- John II Boursier (1415–1424)
- Guy II de Rochechouart (1424–1460)
- Louis I de Rochechouart (1461–1493)
- Peter IX de Rochechouart (1493–1503)

=== 1500–1800 ===
- Raymond Péraud (1503 – 5 September 1505) (Cardinal, Rector of the Patrimony of S. Peter)
  - [ Eustache ]
- Francesco Soderini (26 June 1506 – 1515) (Cardinal)
- Giuliano Soderini (1515–1544)
- Charles, Cardinal de Bourbon (1545–1550) (Cardinal)
- Tristan de Bizet (1550–1576)
- Nicolas Le Cornu de la Courbe de Brée (1576–1617)
- Michel II Raoul (1617–1630)
- Jacques-Raoul de la Guibougère (1631–1648) (He became the first Bishop of La Rochelle)
- Louis II de Bassompierre (1648–1676)
- Guillaume du Plessis de Gesté (1677–1702)
- Bertrand de Senaux (1702)
- Alexandre de Chevrières de Saint-Mauris (1703–1710)
- Henry Augustin Le Pileur (1711–1716)
- Léon de Beaumont (1718–1744)
- Simon-Pierre de Lacoré (1744–1762)
- Germain du Chastergner de la Chasteigneraye (1763–1781)
- Pierre-Louis de La Rochefoucauld (1781–1792)
  - Isaac-Etienne Robinet (1791–1793) (Constitutional Bishop)
- Jean François de Couet du Vivier de Lorry (La Rochelle) (1802)

== See also ==
- Catholic Church in France
- List of Catholic dioceses in France

== Books and articles ==
=== Reference books ===
- Gams, Pius Bonifatius (1873). Series episcoporum Ecclesiae catholicae: quotquot innotuerunt a beato Petro apostolo. Ratisbon: Typis et Sumptibus Georgii Josephi Manz. pp. 623–624. (Use with caution; obsolete)
- Eubel, Conradus, ed. (1913). Hierarchia catholica, Tomus 1 (second ed.). Münster: Libreria Regensbergiana. pp. 536. (in Latin)
- Eubel, Conradus, ed. (1914). Hierarchia catholica, Tomus 2 (second ed.). Münster: Libreria Regensbergiana. p. 271. (in Latin)
- Eubel, Conradus, ed. (1923). Hierarchia catholica, Tomus 3 (second ed.). Münster: Libreria Regensbergiana. p. 338 (in Latin)
- Gauchat, Patritius (Patrice) (1935). Hierarchia catholica IV (1592–1667). Münster: Libraria Regensbergiana. p. 304. (in Latin)
- Ritzler, Remigius; Sefrin, Pirminus (1952). Hierarchia catholica medii et recentis aevi V (1667–1730). Patavii: Messagero di S. Antonio. p. 343.
- Ritzler, Remigius; Sefrin, Pirminus (1958). Hierarchia catholica medii et recentis aevi VI (1730–1799). Patavii: Messagero di S. Antonio. p. 366.

=== Studies ===
- Audiat, Louis (1871). Saint-Pierre de Saintes, cathédrale et insigne basilique: Histoire – documents – brefs – indulgenges – prières (in French). Saintes: Mme. Z. Mortreuil.
- Depoin, Joseph (1921). Histoire des évêques de Saintes (in French). Vol. Tome I. Ligugé (Vienne): Impr. E. Aubin.
- Duchesne, Louis (1910). Fastes épiscopaux de l'ancienne Gaule: II. L'Aquitaine et les Lyonnaises. Paris: Fontemoing. second edition (in French)
- Favreau, Robert (1991). Archidiacres et actes des évêques de Saintes aux XIè et XIIè siècles (in French). Nancy: Presses universitaires de Nancy.
- Favreau, Robert. "Évêques d’Angoulême et Saintes avant 1200." Revue historique du Centre-Ouest 9, no. 1 (2010): 7–142.
- Grasilier, Th (1877). Notice biographique sur les évêques de Saintes (in French). Imprimerie Hus.
- Halfond, Gregory I. (2010). "Appendix A. Frankish Councils, 511-768". Archaeology of Frankish Church Councils, AD 511–768. Boston-Leiden: Brill. pp. 223–246. ISBN 978-90-04-17976-9.
- Jean, Armand (1891). Les évêques et les archevêques de France depuis 1682 jusqu'à 1801 (in French). Paris: A. Picard. pp. 152–155.
- Jones, Anna Trumbore (2007). "Lay Magnates, Religious Houses, and the Role of the Bishop in Aquitaine (877–1050)," in: John S. Ott; Anna Trumbore Jones (2007). The Bishop Reformed: Studies of Episcopal Power and Culture in the Central Middle Ages. Aldershot, Hampshire UK: Ashgate Publishing, Ltd. pp. 21–39. ISBN 978-0-7546-5765-1.
- Michaud, Alain (1989). Histoire de Saintes (in French). Toulouse: Privat. ISBN 978-2-7089-8252-9.
