= Palladius of Saintes =

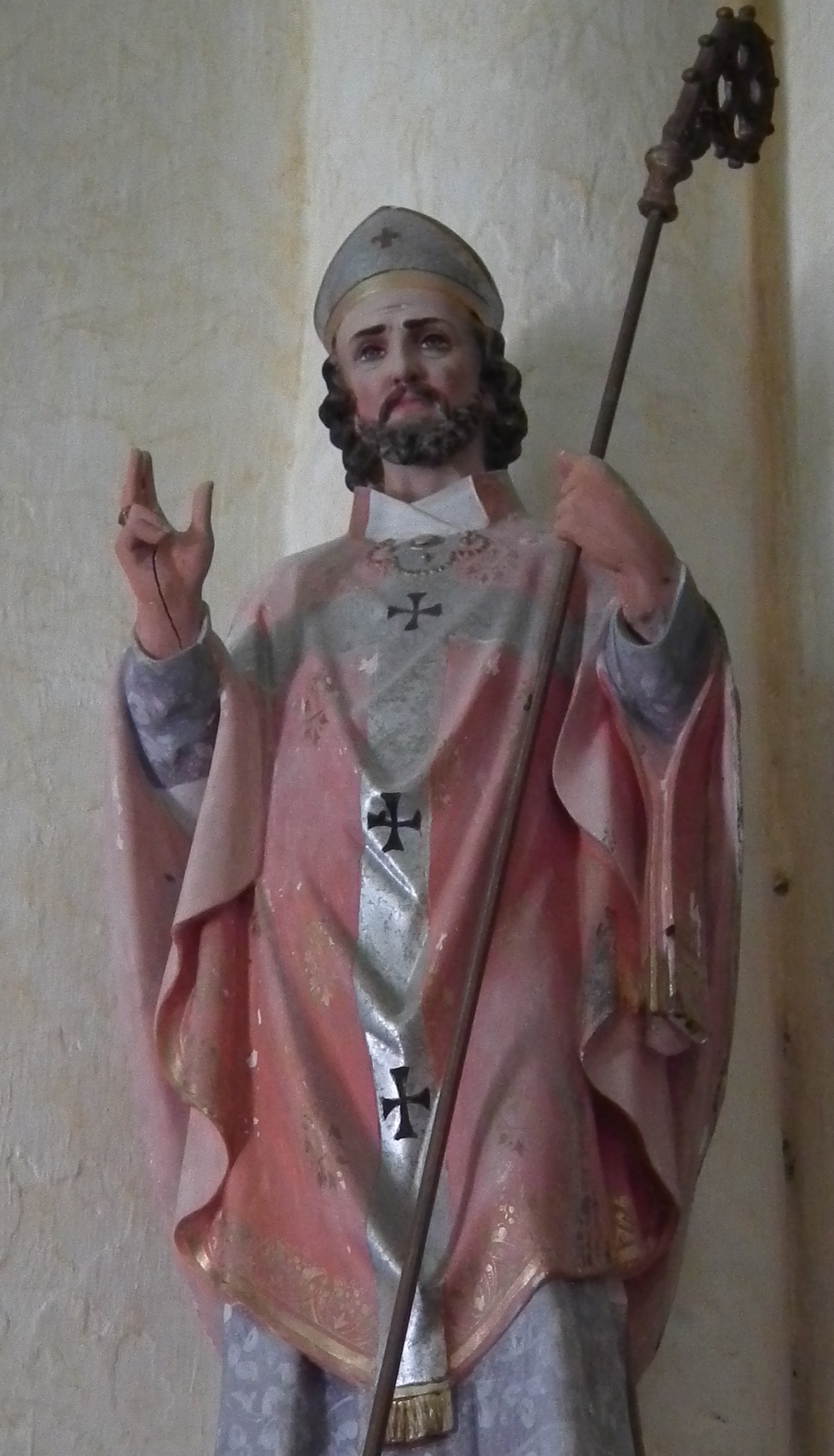
Sculpture of Palladius at the Church of Saint-Palais-de-Phiolin

Palladius or more often in French Pallais was a 6th-century bishop of Saintes. According to Gregory of Tours, the family of Palladius was wealthy, and had produced several bishops and teachers throughout the 5th century in Gaul.

Palladius plotted against the Merovingian king Guntram, whose territory included Saintes, and sided with his rival Gundoald. He consecrated Faustianus as bishop of Dax in 584, at Gundoald's behest. He was chastised by Guntram, who shunned having mass with him, and both the clergy under him and the metropolitan bishop withdrew their support. At the Second Council of Mâcon in 585, the assembled bishops agreed to depose Faustianus, and fined Palladius and two other prelates an annual amount to support him. Two years later, Palladius plotted with Fredegund.

Palladius worked effectively toward building churches and obtaining relics for his diocese. He procured relics of Martin of Tours, built a church in his honor, and reported several healing miracles to have occurred within the first two or three months. Palladius also promoted saints' cults for Eutropius, the first bishop of Saintes, and for the Abbot Martinus who may have studied with Martin of Tours.

In 573, Palladius was a signatory to the canons of the Fourth Council of Paris, and hosted a council within his own diocese in 573. He is last mentioned in 595.
