= Gretchen Berland =

American physician

- Education: Pomona College; Oregon Health & Science University
- Scientific career
- Workplaces: Yale School of Medicine

Gretchen Kimberly Berland is an American physician and filmmaker who is Associate Professor of Medicine at the Yale School of Medicine.

== Life ==
She graduated from Pomona College with a BA in 1986 and Oregon Health & Science University with an MD in 1996. She was a Fellow in the UCLA Robert Wood Johnson Clinical Scholars Program.

== Awards ==
- 2004 MacArthur Fellowship

== Works ==
- Berland, G., Elliott, M., Morales, L. “Health Information on the Internet: Accessibility, Quality, and Readability in English and Spanish.” JAMA. 285 (20): 2612–2621. 2001 May.
- Berland, G., Morales, L., Elliott, M. "A Report on the Quality of Health Information on the Internet.” RAND Health. May 2001.
- "The View from the Other Side — Patients, Doctors, and the Power of a Camera", NEJM, Volume 357:2533-2536, December 20, 2007, Number 25
- Rolling (life in a wheelchair). A 71-minute feature-length documentary that has been widely acclaimed for providing unique patient-centered perspectives into the lives of wheelchair users.
