= Tour Pey-Berland =

Fifteenth century bell tower in Bordeaux next to Cathédrale Saint-André

Coordinates: 44°50′15″N 0°34′36″W

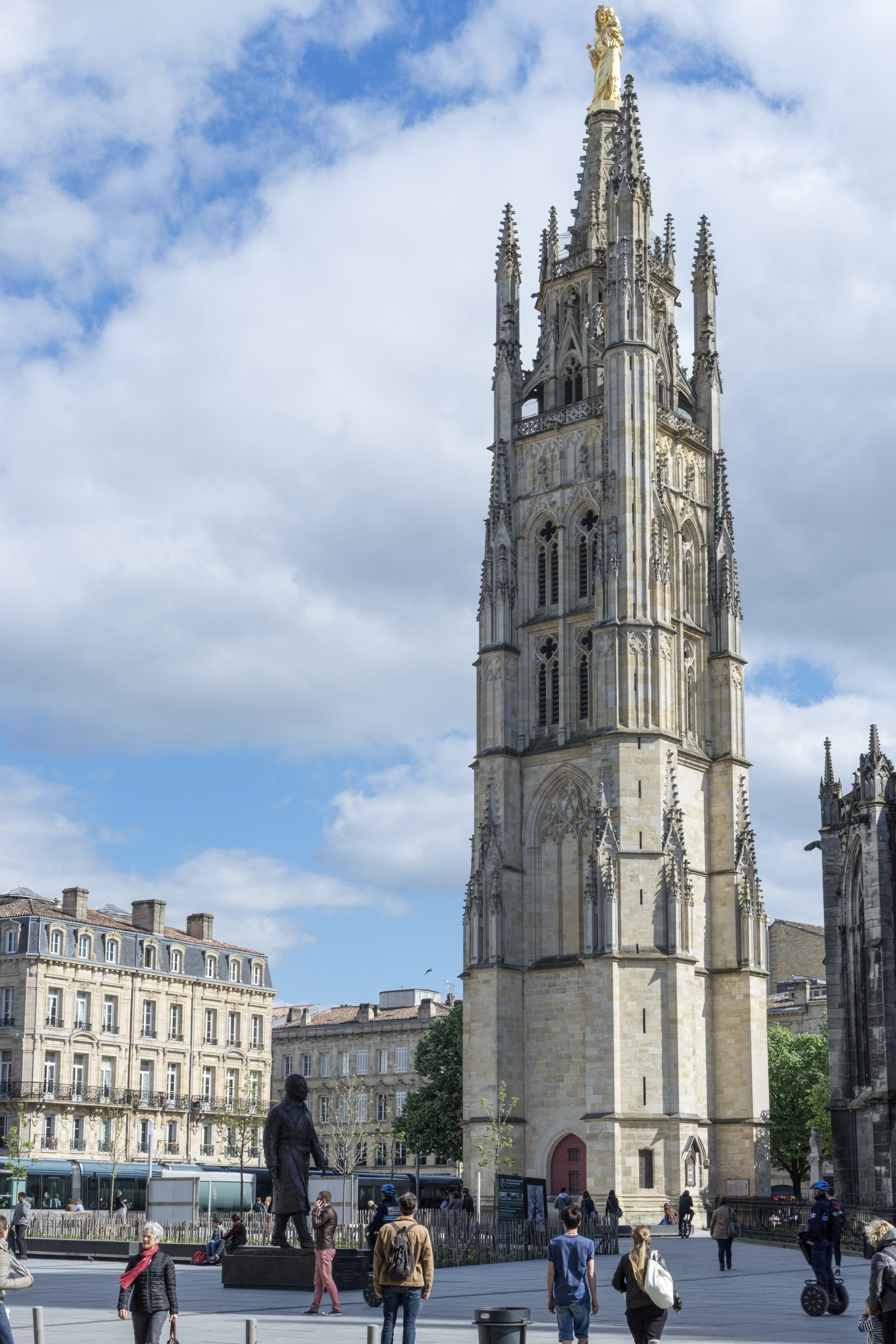
Tour Pey Berland

The Tour Pey-Berland (Pey Berland Tower), named for its patron Pey Berland, is the separate bell tower of the Bordeaux Cathedral, in Bordeaux at the Place Pey Berland.

== History ==
Its construction was from 1440 to 1500 at the initiative of the archbishop of the same name. Crowned a steeple, it has remained isolated from the rest of the Cathedral to protect the cathedral from the vibrations of the bells. After the completion, the church had initially no money for the purchase of bells, therefore the tower was used for housing until 1790. After 1790, a lead factory was set up in the tower. Bells were installed after 1851 and the tower began to be used for its original purpose.

The tower is open to the public, and visitors can walk up its 230 steps for a panoramic view of Bordeaux.

== Bells ==
The tower has 4 bells in the upper and lower levels, with 2 in each.

The lower level has two large bells, Marie and the bourdon Ferdinand-André II. The “II” of Ferdinand-André II is significant because it replaced a short-lived 11-ton predecessor which was cracked upon delivery and had to be melted down. Both are cast by the Bollée foundry in Le Mans and were hung dead to protect the 15th-century freestanding tower from structural vibrations. However as of 2026, the large bells are able to swing.

The upper level has 2 smaller bells, Marguerite and Clémence, these two bells currently operate and chime to mark services, masses, weddings and funerals at Saint-André. Since 1925, electric motors have been used and they are controlled from inside the cathedral itself.

== Gallery ==
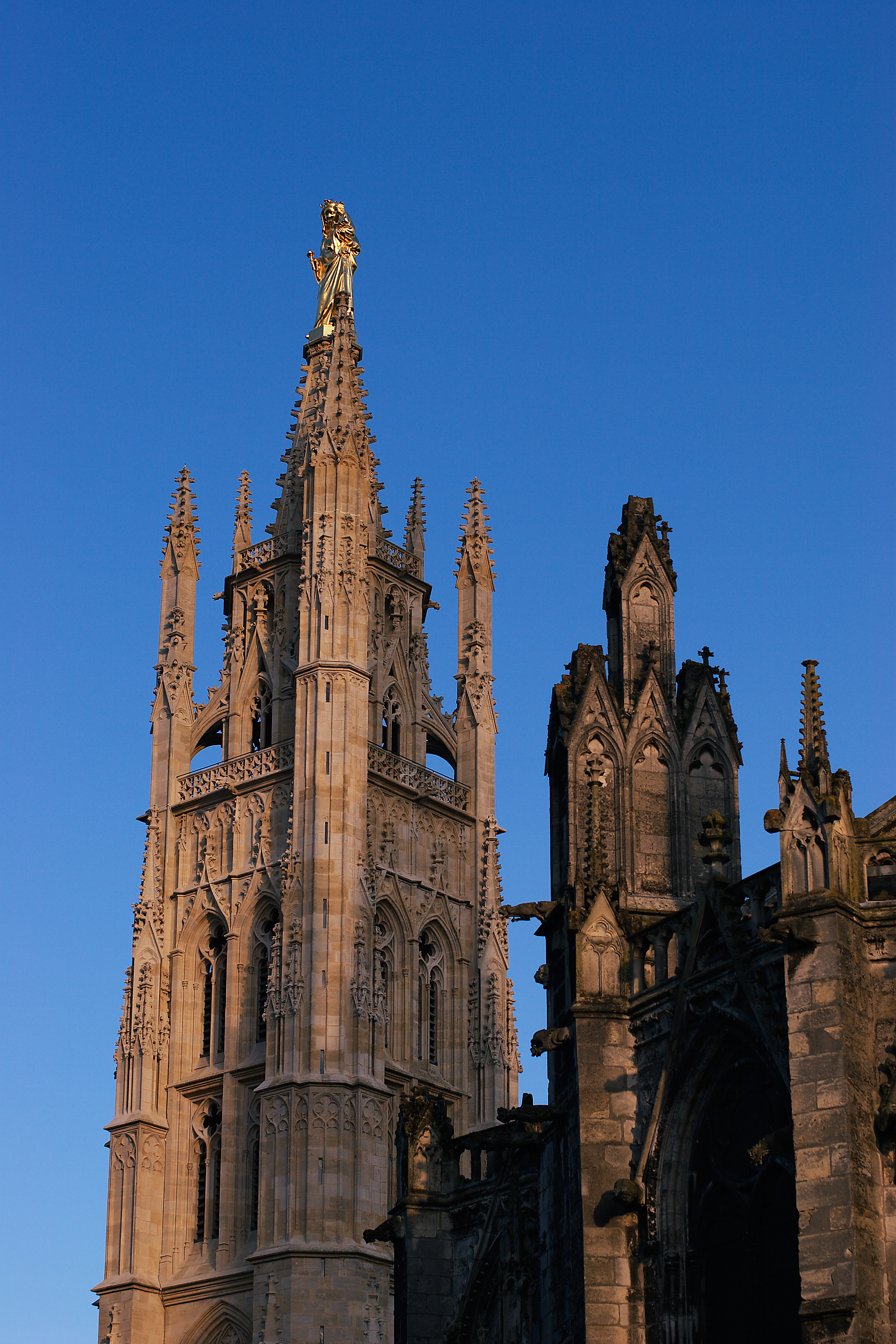
Tower (northwest view) and statue

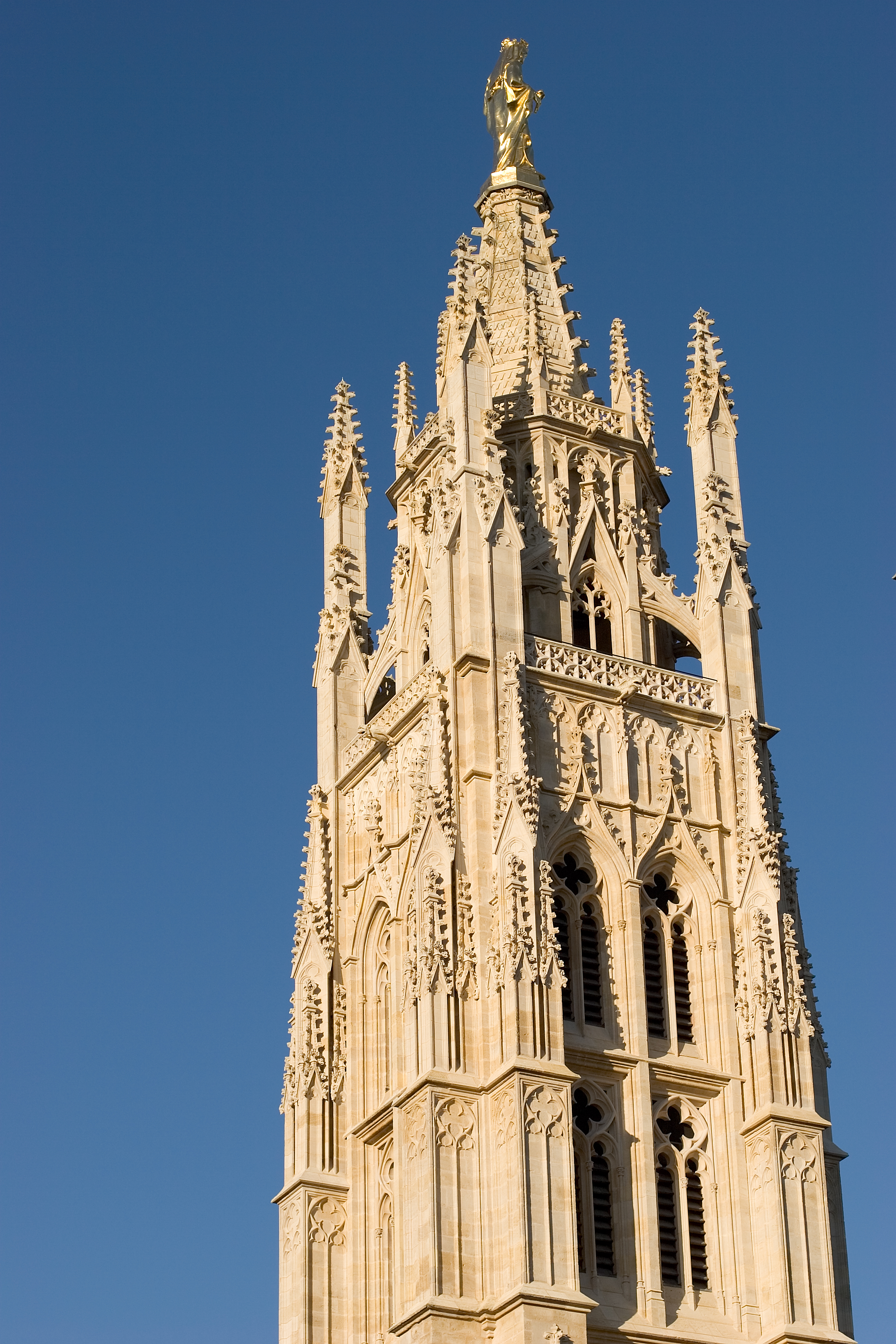
Summit of the tower (southeast view)

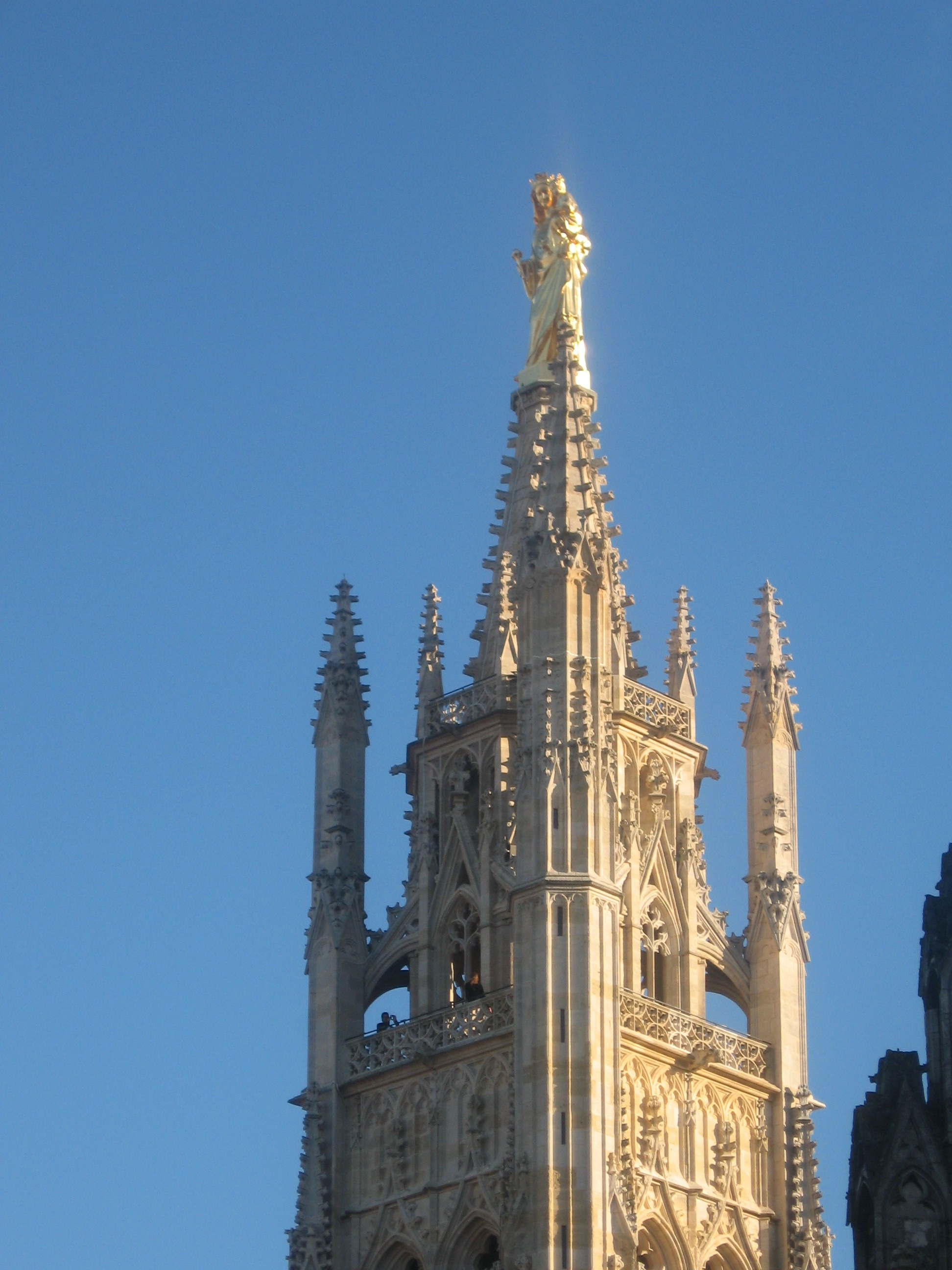
Focus on statue Notre Dame D'Aquitaine

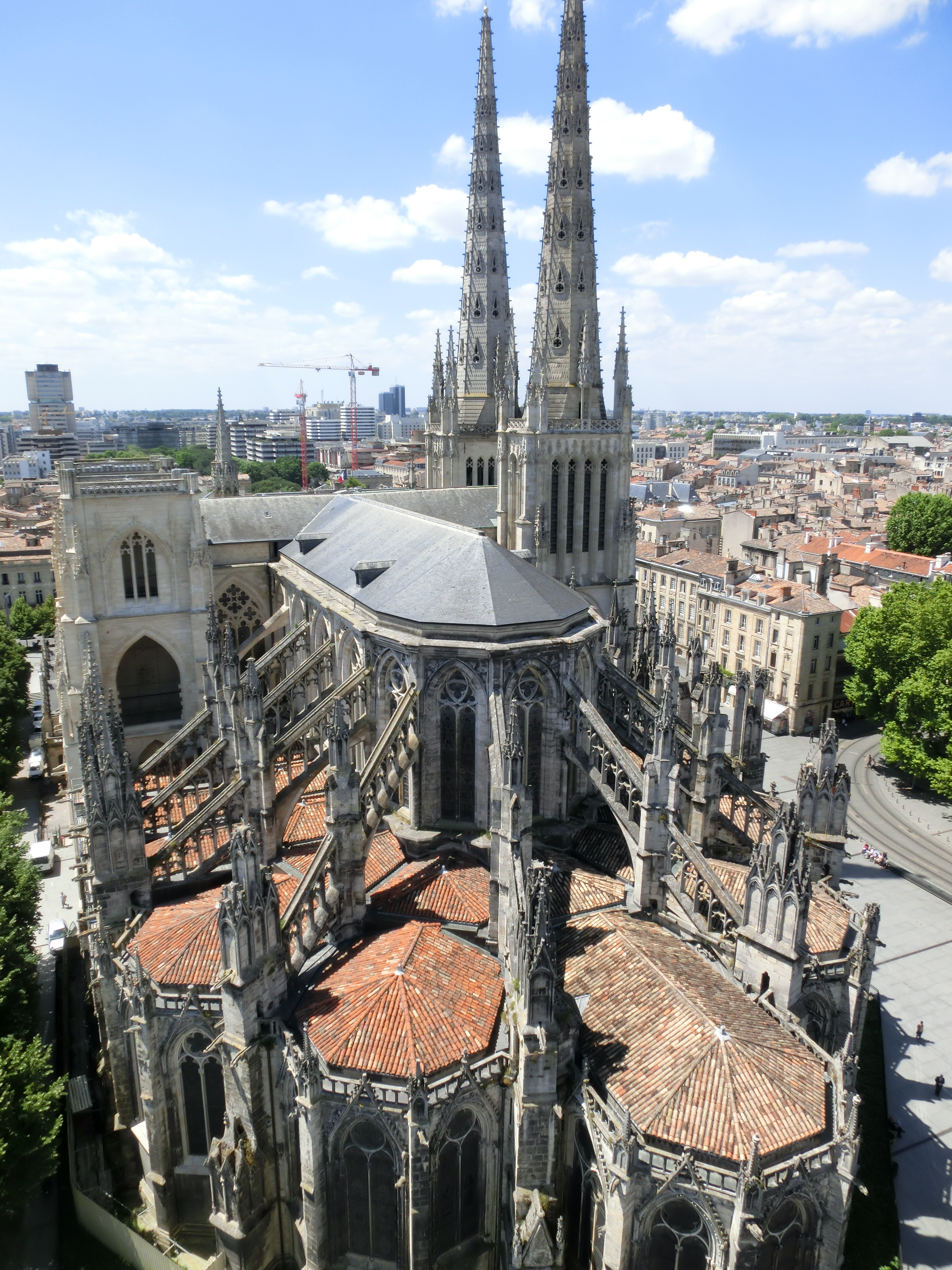
View of the cathedral from the tower
