= André Berland =

French historian (1940–2025)

- Born: 10 May 1940; Gond-Pontouvre, France
- Died: 6 May 2025 (aged 84)
- Occupations: Historian; biographer

André Berland (10 May 1940 – 6 May 2025) was a French historian and biographer.

Berland taught history at the Lycée de Confolens and the Lycée de Royan and joined the Société archéologique et historique de la Charente. He was also treasurer of the Société des Amis du musée de Royan from 1986 to 1999 and secretary of the Amis de Chassenon. He wrote biographies about historical figures from Charente, notably Jacques Roux.

André Berland died on 6 May 2025, at the age of 84.

== Publications ==
- Pressignac en Charente limousine autrefois (1987)
- Un grand révolutionnaire charentais, l'abbé Jacques Roux: les débuts en Angoumois et en Saintonge du futur chef des Enragés, 1752–1794 (1988)
- Ludovic Trarieux, fondateur de la ligue des droits de l'Homme (1990)
- La vie prodigieuse et aventureuse de Guillaume Resnier (1729–1811): le général volant (1991)
- Chassenon d'hier et d'aujourd'hui (1993)
- Hommes et monuments d'Étagnac (1996)
- Roumazières-Loubert: 2000 ans d'histoire (2001)
- Rochechouart et ses environs (2002)
- "Le vase de la Guierce" (2008)
