= Gombald =

Gundobald or Gombald (died after 998) was the Archbishop of Bordeaux from 989 to his death. He was the episcopus Gasconum, bishop of the Gascons, from 978, holding the episcopal dignity in all the Gascon sees. He was the third son of Sancho IV of Gascony and thus a brother of Sancho V and William II, successive dukes of Gascony.

In 977, he refounded the monastery of La Réole. He and his brother William together had complete control of the ecclesiastical and secular administration of Gascony, which allowed the duchy to prosper and reenter history after a period of obscurity during their rule. Gundobald was eventually elevated to the archiepiscopal dignity of Bordeaux. He dedicated the monastery at Maillezais.

In June 989, he led the synod of Charroux, at which the Peace of God was first proclaimed. He pronounced excommunication on all those who plundered churches, assaulted the clergy, or robbed the rustic poor.

== Sources ==
- Higounet, Charles. Bordeaux pendant le haut moyen age. Bordeaux, 1963.
- Jordan, William Chester. Europe in the High Middle Ages. London: Viking, 2003.
