= Miracula sancti Martialis anno 1388 patrata =

Dossier on a saintly intercession

The Miracula sancti Martialis anno 1388 patrata ('Miracles of Saint Martial Completed in the Year 1388') is a dossier of 73 miracles performed through the intercession of Saint Martial between 1378 and 1388. The Latin manuscript was found in the seminary of Nîmes by the Bollandists François Arbellot and Charles De Smedt, who edited and published it.

== Historical context ==
The Miracula was written at the height of the Hundred Years' War and amidst a major revival of Saint Martial's cult. The first ostensio (public display) of the relics of the saint took place in 994, but in the 14th century they became common (being held in 1300, 1306, 1306, 1317, 1364, 1388 and 1399). Popes Clement VI (1343) and Gregory IX (1376) granted indulgences to pilgrims to Martial's shrine at his abbey in Limoges.

The region around Limoges, the Limousin, suffered heavily during the war. In 1370, Limoges was besieged by the Black Prince and sacked. The land was ravaged by routiers. When a truce was announced between the English and the French, the relics of Saint Martial were put on display from 8 May until 14 June. The truce was officially signed on 18 August and came into effect in the Limousin on 2 September.

The Miracula was compiled between August 1388 and the end of 1389 by an anonymous apostolic penitentiary. It may have been commissioned by the abbot of Limoges, Geraud Jouviand.

== Contents ==
The Miracula gives short formulaic accounts of the miracles with minimum detail. They would not have met the standards of the Papal curia for verifying miracles, although they show some awareness of the need to prove that events had not followed a merely natural course. Each account contains the name of the witness to the miracle, his or her place of origin, the object of the miracle, the invocation of the saint, the fulfillment of the request and the fulfillment of the petitioner's vow made at the time of the request.

Most of the miracles relate to the hardships of war. The display of Martial's relics brought food and pilgrims to the city when it was besieged by Geoffroy Tête-Noire. Nevertheless, the universality of Martial's cult was stressed. He interceded for the English as well as French and in cases of French misbehaviour (such as the robbing of a priest). His petitioners included rich and poor, urban and rural, noble and serf, men and women. His range, however, was about 60 miles (97 km)—all the miracles occurred within a radius of that length from Limoges.

A later editor added a comment to the Miracula noting that the peace was attributed to the saint and there was a general hope that the Great Schism in the western Church would soon be healed.

== Editions ==
- François Arbellot and Charles De Smedt, edd., "Miracula S. Martialis anno 1388 pattata", Analecta Bollandiana 1 (1882), 411–446.
- Jean-Loup Lemaître, ed., "Les miracles de Saint Martial accomplis lors de l'Ostension de 1388", Bulletin de la société archéologique et historique du Limousin 102 (1975), 67–139.
