= Saint Martial =

3rd-century founding bishop of Limoges

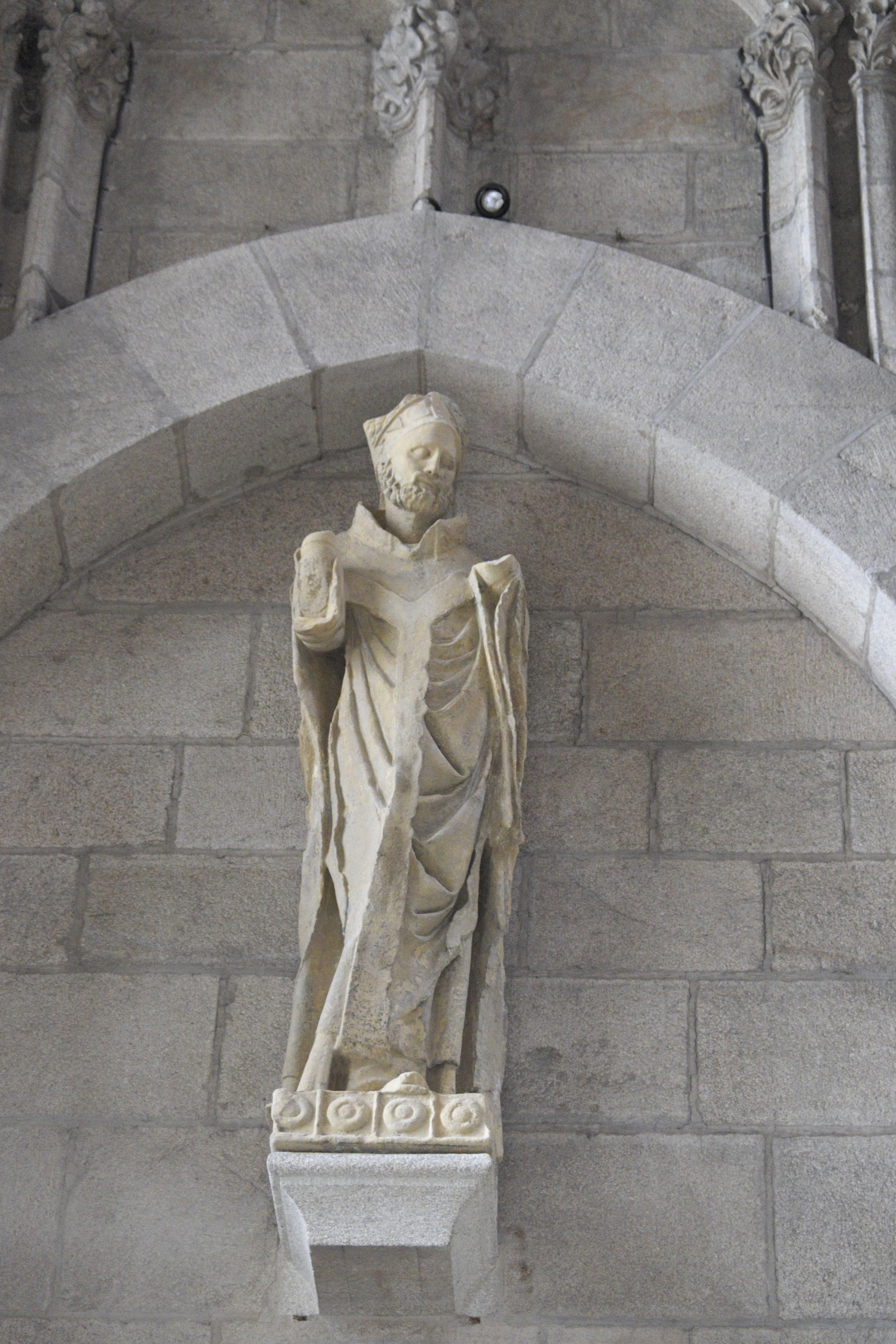
- 14th-century statue of Saint Martial affixed to the narthex of Limoges Cathedral

Bishop, Apostle of the Gauls, Apostle of Aquitaine
- Born: unknown
- Died: 3rd century probably Limoges
- Venerated in: Eastern Orthodox Church, Roman Catholicism
- Canonized: Pre-Congregation
- Major shrine: Shrine of St Martial in the church of St Michel des Lions
- Feast: 30 June
- Attributes: raising the dead to life
- Patronage: prisoners, Limoges, Avignon, Cahors, against epidemics, against ergotism
- Influenced: Valerie of Limoges

Martial of Limoges (3rd century), whose name is also rendered as Marcial, Martialis, and Marcialis, and is also called "the Apostle of the Gauls" or "the Apostle of Aquitaine," was the first bishop of Limoges. Venerated as a Christian saint, Martial of Limoges is considered to have been canonized Pre-Congregation, and his feast day is on 30 June.

St. Martial on the arms of Limoges

== Life ==
Of somewhat uncertain origin, Martial is said to have come from "the Orient." A medieval hymn, tentatively attributed to Venantius Fortunatus, suggests that he was of highborn Jewish origin. (Note: Beniamita tribus te gessit sanguine claro : “The tribe of Benjamin bore you with distinguished blood.”)

According to Gregory of Tours, during the time of the Emperors Decius Pope Fabian sent out seven bishops from Rome to Gaul to preach the Gospel: Gatien to Tours, Trophimus to Arles, Paul to Narbonne, Saturnin to Toulouse, Denis to Paris, Austromoine to Clermont, and Martial to Limoges. According to the Golden Legend, when Martial first went to Limoges as a missionary, he visited the temple, where the priests beat him before having him imprisoned. During his morning prayers the following day, a great light surrounded him and the bars and chains burst open, releasing Martial and resulting in the prison guards requesting to be baptised by him. He succeeded in converting the inhabitants to Christianity, and his memory has always been venerated there.

== Abbey ==
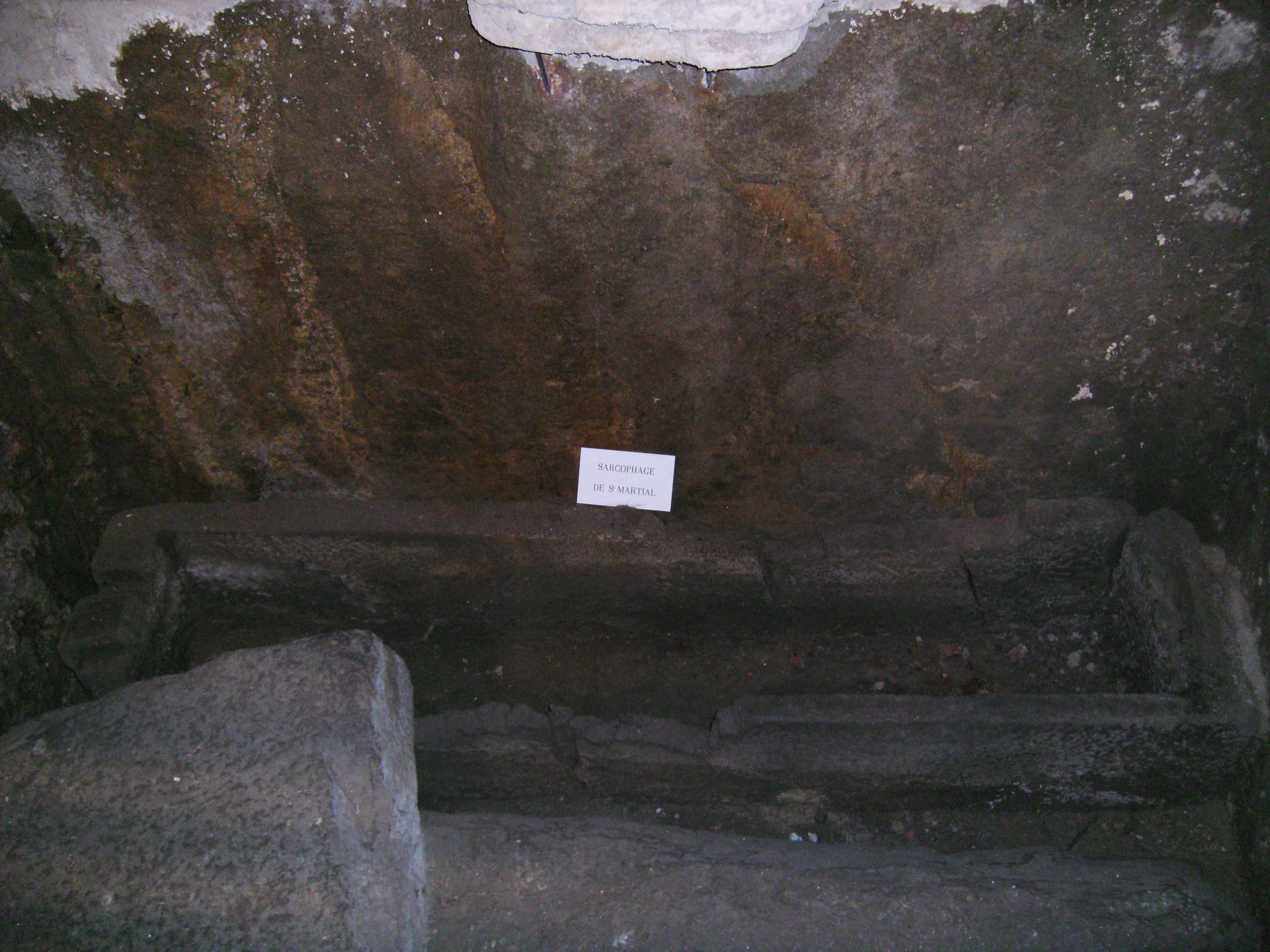
Sarcophagus of St Martial in the crypt below the Place de la République, Limoges

Martial died in Limoges and was buried outside the Roman town. As his tomb became progressively more important as a pilgrimage site, the monks found patronage in the Benedictine order in the 9th century. The site became the Benedictine Abbey of Saint-Martial, a great library (second only to the library at Cluny), and scriptorium. The 12th-century chronicler Geoffroy du Breuil of Vigeois worked in its library.

The Abbey of Saint-Martial, one of the great pilgrimage churches of western Christianity, was so thoroughly razed in the 19th century, that only the scattered manuscripts of its library remain. Some of said manuscripts had been bought for Louis XV and have come to the Bibliothèque Nationale de France. The original crypt was exhumed in 1966–1970. Twelve Romanesque carved capitals were discovered built into the foundations of a barn and purchased in 1994 for the Museum of the Bishopric of Limoges.

== Hagiography ==
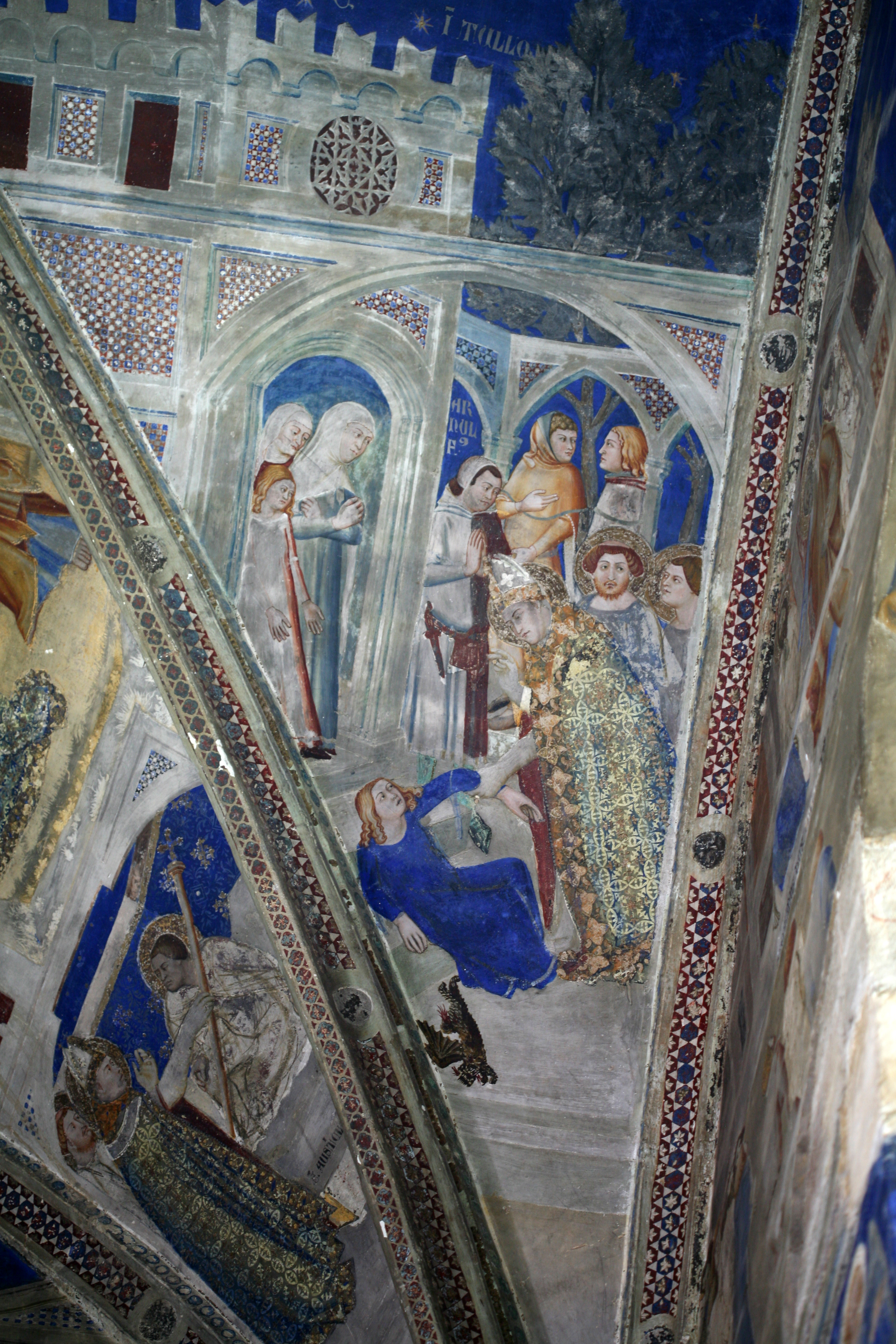
Saint Martial cures the son of Arnulfus.

The Miracula Martialis, an account of 7th-, 8th- and 9th-century miracles, was written shortly after 854.

The influx of pilgrims to the abbey where the historical Martial lay buried encouraged the creation of an elaborate hagiography during the 10th century. As the hagiography grew, Martial was moved back in time: now, sent into Gaul by Peter himself, he is said to have evangelized not only the Province of Limoges but all of Aquitaine. He performed many miracles, among others the raising of a dead man to life, by touching him with a rod that Peter had given him.

The mythology culminated in the 11th century forgeries of Ademar of Chabannes, The Life of St. Martial, attributed to Bishop Aurelian, his successor, which was designed to 'prove' that Martial had been baptized by Peter, was one of the seventy-two disciples and present at the Last Supper.

In the 13th century compendium of lore, the Golden Legend, the legendary Martial appears with many miracles, casting out fiends and raising the dead and conducting mass baptisms.

In the midst of a revival of his cult in the 14th century, 73 miracles were recorded between 1378 and 1388 in the Miracula sancti Martialis anno 1388 patrata.

As late as 1854, Mons. Buissas, Bishop of Limoges, petitioned Pope Pius IX to bestow on Martial the honors of a disciple of Christ, but was turned down. The full discovery of Ademar's tissue of forged documents, including an imaginary church council and a papal letter, was not revealed until the 1920s, and continued for several generations to be resisted in conservative Catholic circles.

Martial is also associated with Valerie of Limoges, a martyr of the 3rd or 4th centuries, who is said to have carried her head to him after her decapitation.

== Veneration ==
His help was invoked during an epidemic of widespread ergot poisoning in Limoges in 994. Martial was particularly honored in Bordeaux, where his pastoral staff was kept in the Basilica Saint-Seurin and used in processions to invoke his aid during outbreaks of pestilence. He is a popular saint throughout Limousin. He is also venerated in Italy, where Colle di Val d'Elsa Cathedral is dedicated to him.

Aside from ergotism, he is generally invoked against epidemics; he is also a patron saint of prisoners. As a patron saint of places, Limoges, Avignon, and Cahors all enjoy his patronage.

The Cloisters has a 12th-century stained-glass window of "Saint Martial Founding the Cathedral of Saint-Pierre."

St Martial's chapel at the papal palace in Avignon was used for deliberations during conclaves. Saint-Martial Temple, a Gothic church in Avignon, was completed in 1402.

In Brazilian folklore, he is celebrated with bonfires on the day of his liturgical feast which closes the Festas Juninas in Maranhão. In São Luís, in 2007, a monument was erected in his honor, given the popularity of his festivities, held in the city since 1928, and which annually gather thousands of people, in the Festejo de São Pedro e São Marçal, with the celebrations of the bumba-meu-boi.

== Gallery ==
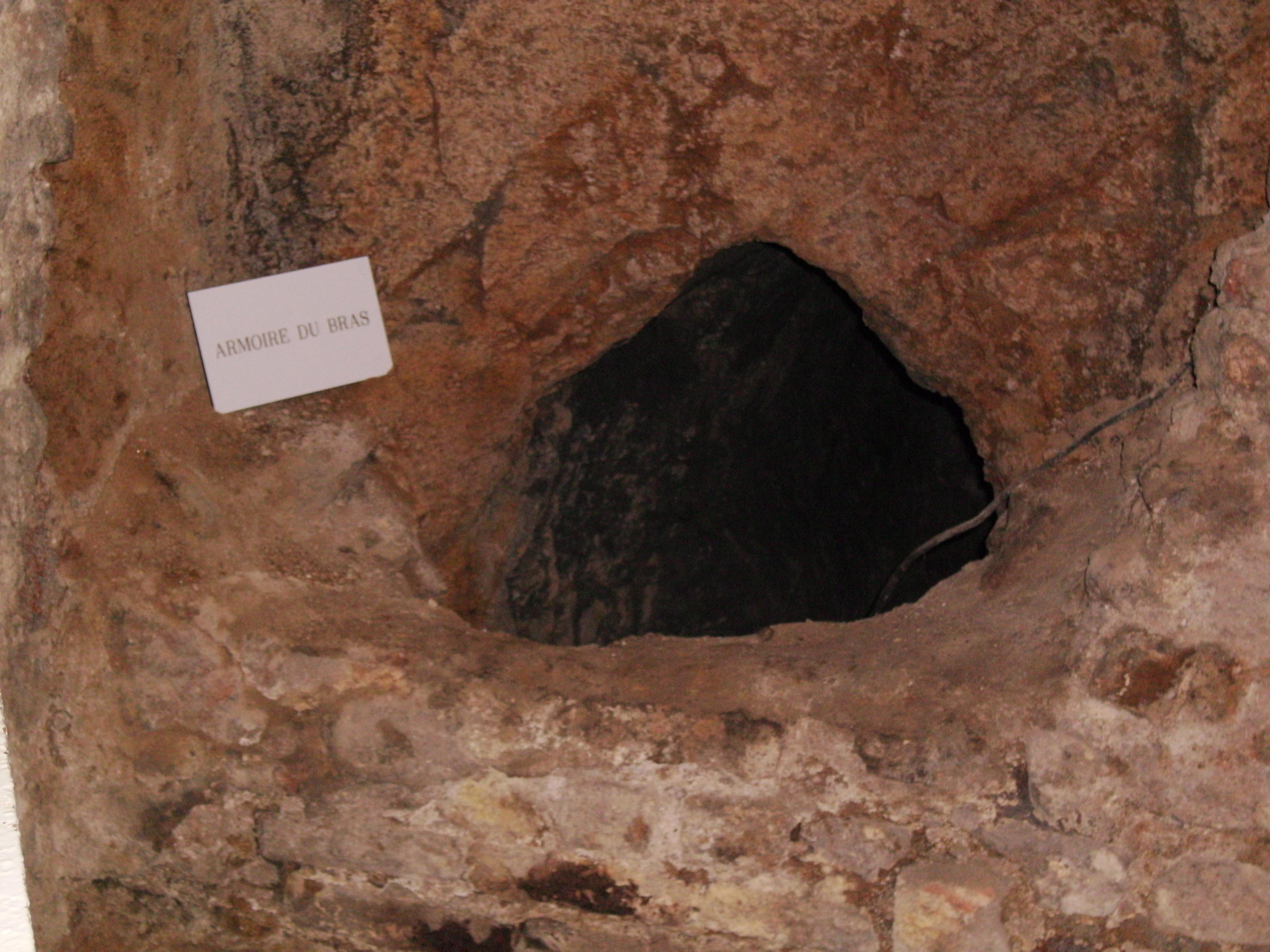
Cupboard of the Arm, where a medieval reliquary containing the arm of Martial was stored.

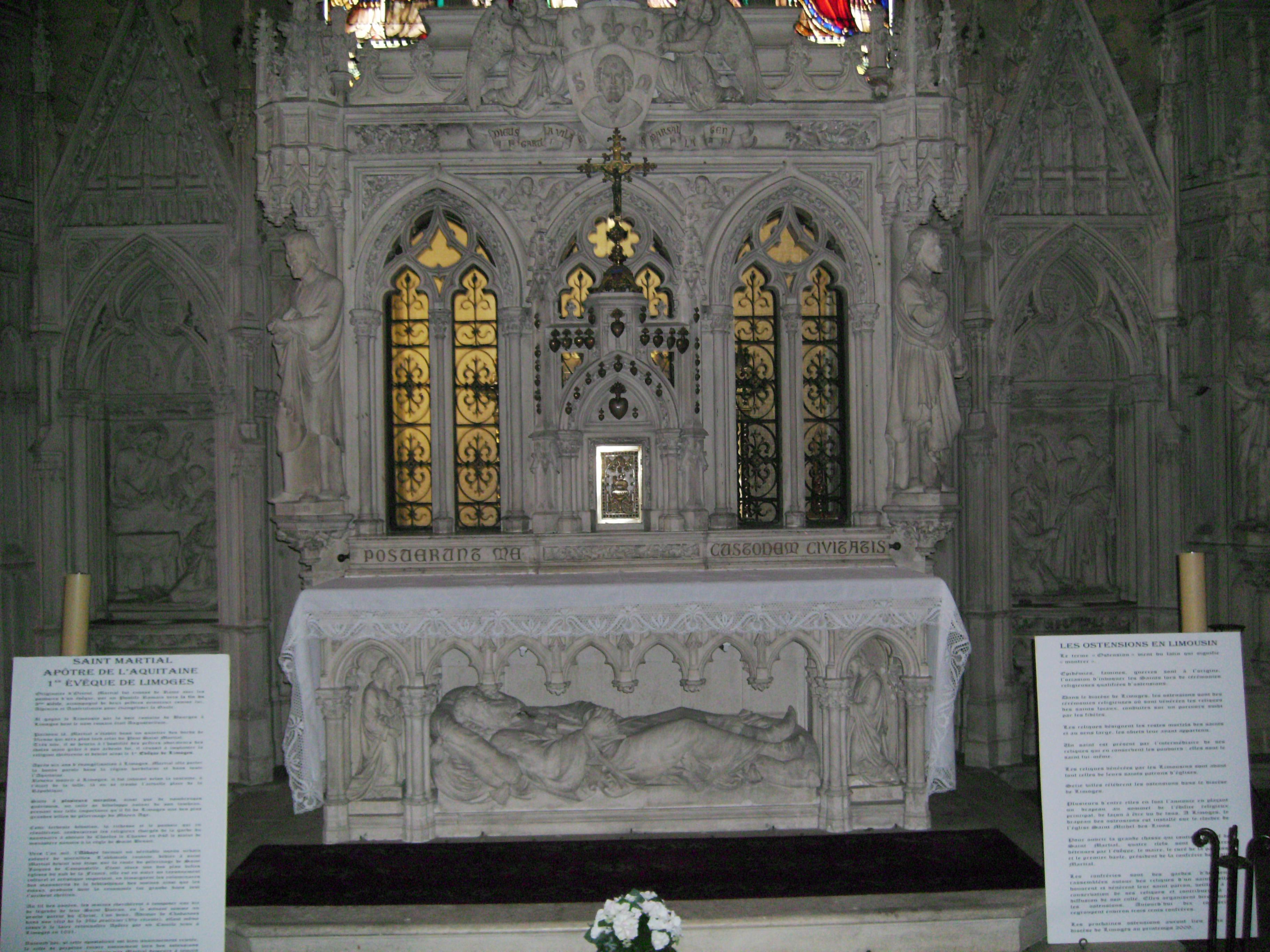
Shrine of St Martial in the church of St Michel des Lions, Limoges, where the relics have been stored since the dissolution of the abbey

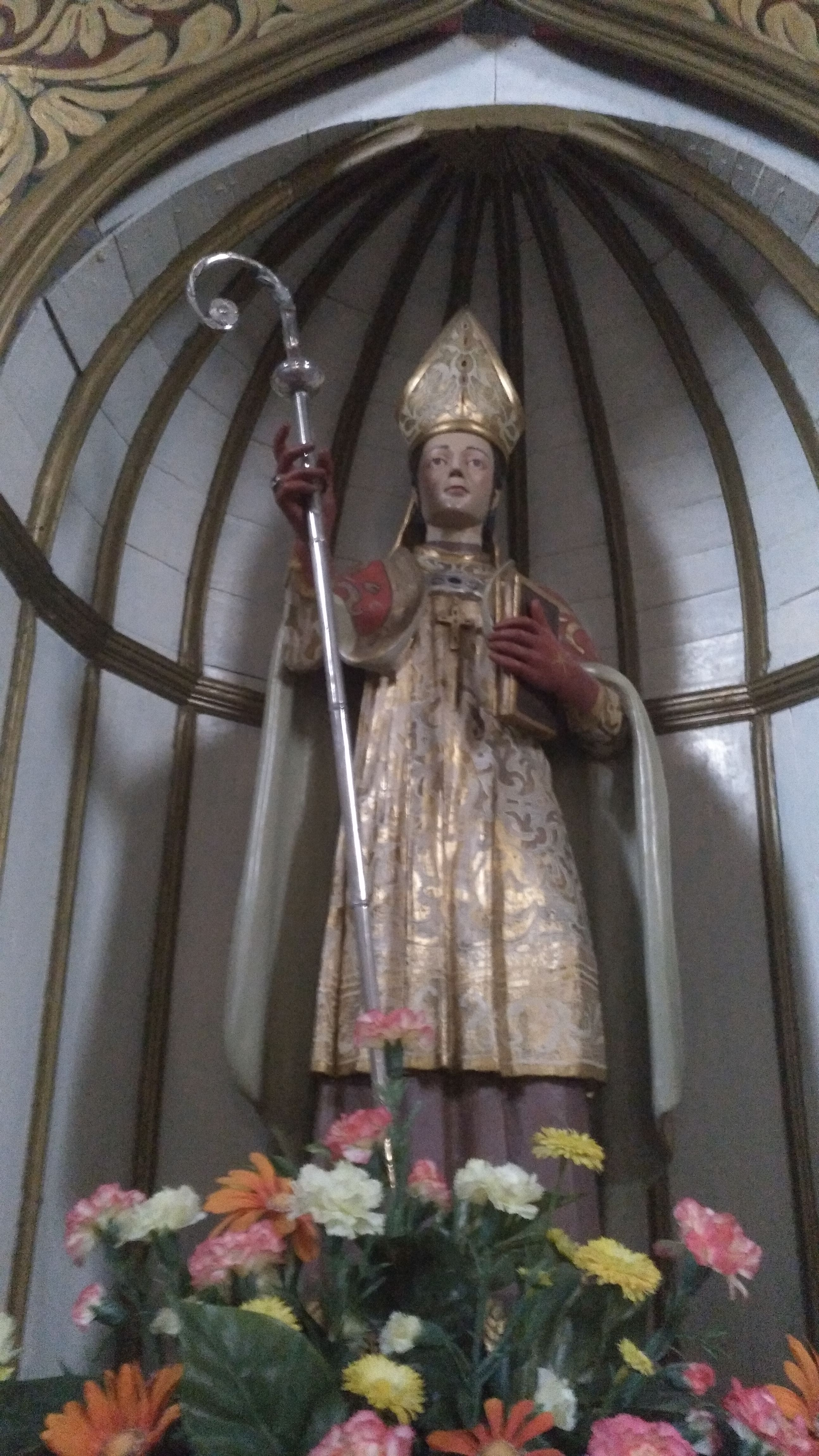
A statue of St Martial at the Ermita de San Marcial de Limoges, Femés, Lanzarote (he is the patron saint of Lanzarote)

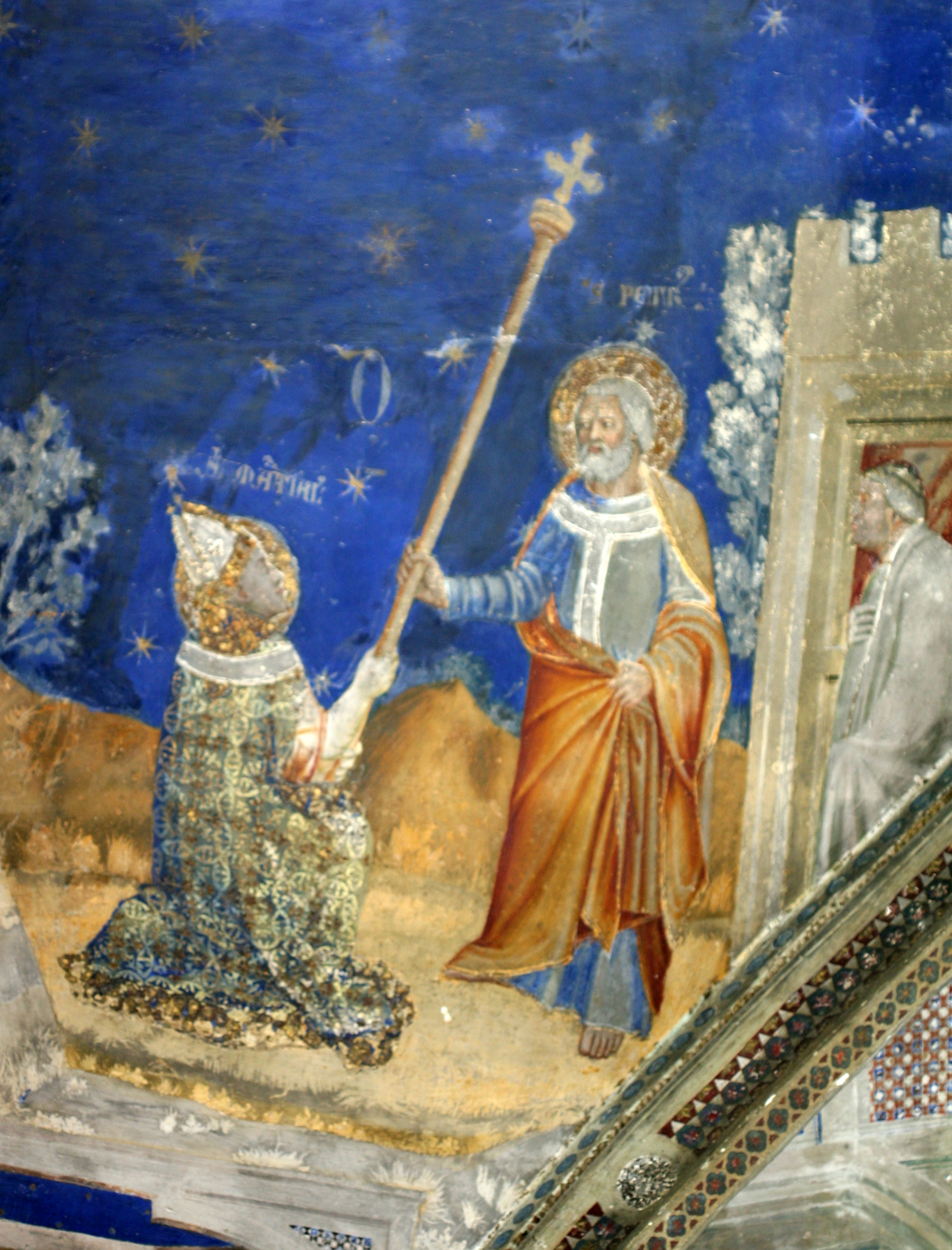
Saint Martial Receives the Pastoral Staff From Saint Peter, in a fresco in the Palais des Papes, Avignon
