= Geoffroy de Breuil =

French chronicler

Geoffroy de Breuil of Vigeois (French pronunciation: [ʒɔfʁwa də bʁœj]) was a 12th-century chronicler, trained at the Benedictine abbey of Saint-Martial of Limoges, the site of a great early library.

== Life ==
Geoffrey was born around 1140. He joined the abbey of St. Martial in Limoges as a monk in 1160, was ordained as a priest in 1168 after a brief period at La Souterraine, and became Prior (1178–1184) of the St. Martial dependency in Vigeois in 1178. It was at Vigeois that Geoffrey composed his Chroniques which trace in detail some great local families, often Geoffroy's forebears and kin, while relating events happening from 994 to 1184: the fiery convulsive sickness, (actually ergotism from a fungus or ergot of wheat), the preparations for the First Crusade, reports of combats in the Holy Land, the spread of Cathar beliefs (writing in 1181, he was the first to use the term Albigensians), (Note: "For an early usage, by the Limousin chronicler Geoffrey de Vigeois, in reference to the papal legate Henry de Marcy's military campaign against the 'Albigensian heretics' at Lavaur in 1181.") while unconsciously revealing the preoccupations and mannerisms of the times. Geoffrey's chronicle is also a key source for historians of the crusades because it contains details about how the descendants of crusaders commemorated their ancestors, as well as the earliest known version of the so-called "Saladin Legend" in western Europe.

== Sources ==
- Botineau, Pierre; Lemaitre, Jean-Loup; Barrière, Bernadette, eds. (2021). La chronique de Geoffroi de Breuil (in Latin and French). Paris: Société de l'Histoire de France. ISBN 9782354071516.
- France, John (2024). "Violence and Monasticism in Two Aquitanian Chronicles". In Kooper, Erik S.; Levelt, Sjoerd (eds.). The Medieval Chronicle. Vol. 16. Brill. pp. 61–88.
- Power, Daniel (2013). "Who Went on the Albigensian Crusade?". The English Historical Review. 128 (534 (OCTOBER)): 1047–1085.
