= Valerie of Limoges =

Christian martyr and saint

Saint Valerie of Limoges
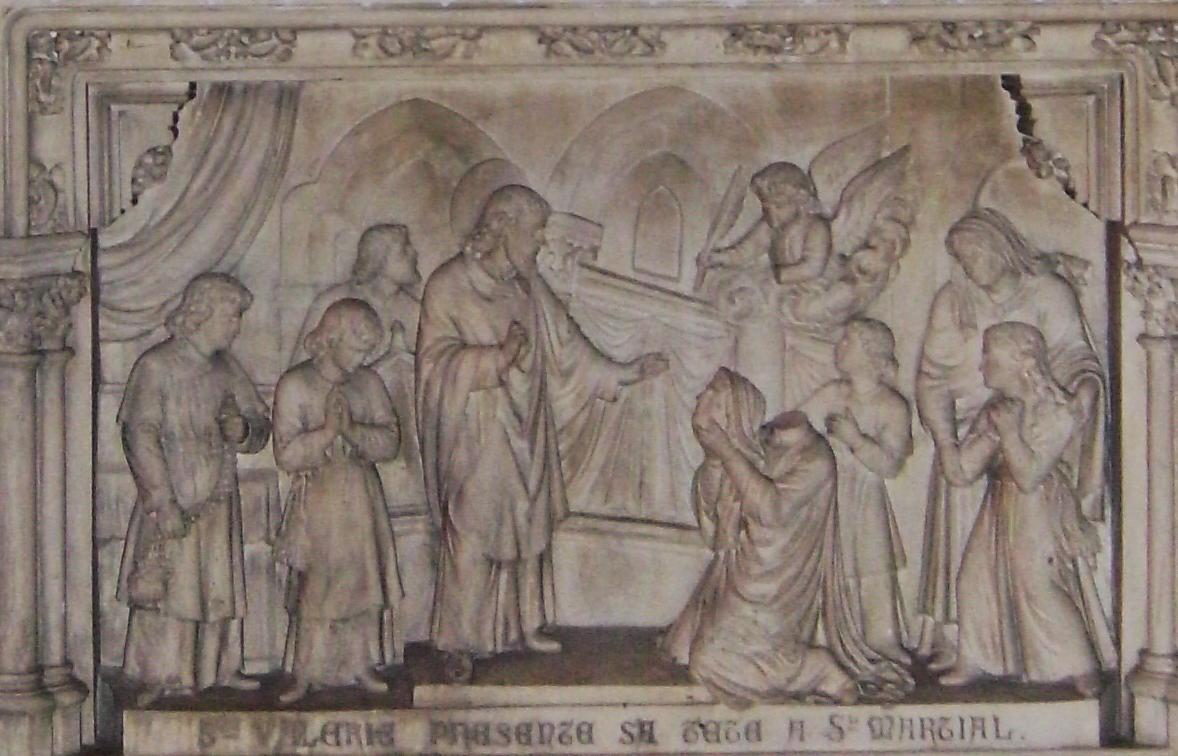
- Close-up of altar relief: St Valerie presents her own head to her confessor, St Martial. Limoges.
- Venerated in: Catholic Church; Eastern Orthodox Church
- Major shrine: Church of St. Michel des Lions, Limoges
- Feast: December 9

Valerie of Limoges (also Valeria of Limoges) is a legendary Christian martyr and cephalophore, associated with the Roman period, whose cult was very important in Limousin, France, during the medieval period. She has been an important subject for Christian art since the Middle Ages and for porcelain figurines over several centuries.

== Dating and hagiography ==
The incident most insistently retold about Valerie is that she was beheaded for her faith and then carried her own head to set before her bishop, Martial, who had converted her. This firmly places her in the Roman period, although later hagiographers had Martial himself sent to Gaul by Peter rather than by Pope Fabian, according to earlier tradition.

On the other hand, Valerie's legend is also retold with Duke Stephen (or Steven) of Guyenne (Aquitaine) as her antagonist and executioner. According to this version, she was pressured to marry Duke Stephen, who was a pagan. For her refusal to break her vows of chastity, he had her beheaded. This moves her into the medieval period, though precisely how it squares with her being a Christian in a pagan environment is unclear. Obviously, the duke's name is Christian. There are neither recorded dukes of Aquitaine with that name nor any pagan dukes of Aquitaine.

However, a black-and-white reproduction of a print publication depicting Saint Valerie of Limoges calls this Duke Stephen by the name Julius Silanus, and described him as a proconsul of Aquitaine:

"fille d'une noble dame qui avait donne l'hospitalite a Saint Martial lorqu'il vint a Limoges, Valerie s'etait convertie au christianisme. Comme elle refusait sa main a Julius Silanus, pro-consul d'Acquitane, celui-ci la fi decapiter. Valerie prit sa tete entre ses mains et la porta a l'autel ou saint Martin disait sa messe"

(English translation) "The daughter of a noblewoman who had given hospitality to Saint Martial when he came to Limoges, Valerie had converted to Christianity. When she refused her hand to Julius Silanus, pro-consul of Aquitaine, he had her beheaded. Valerie took his head in her hands and carried it to the altar where Saint Martin was saying his mass."

Although she was considered the first martyr of Aquitaine, it is probably best to see Valerie as a legendary figure whose cult has nourished a certain amount of narrative elaboration, attracting narrative elements of varied, sometimes inconsistent, origins.

== Parallels ==
The most obvious parallels to the legendary figure of Valerie are those that manifest the distinctive trait of cephalophory. France is fairly rich in these, including most notably the capital's patron saint, Denis. The severed head that goes on preaching is a powerful assertion of autonomy, or perhaps theonomy in the face of persecution, with bishop Denis continuing his work of prophecy and preaching. In St Valerie's case, the severed head is returned to where it belongs, the deceased person's bishop, pastor and confessor. In both cases, there is a continuity in the relationship to the Church beyond death.

The more basic theme of decapitation widens the field of comparison greatly. An obvious source of parallels is the deuterocanonical book of Judith, in which we find a young woman pledging herself to virginity after seducing and decapitating a tyrannical enemy of the faith and presenting his head to her countrymen. The mythemes are differently configured, but there seem to be similar underlying concerns in which the faith community is threatened by both persecution and exogamy.

The most obvious parallels are perhaps with the Biblical and post-Biblical narrative of John the Baptist. Here we find not only a beheading, but a problematic marriage (with suggestions of incest rather than exogamy), defiant denunciation of tyranny, a centrally important young woman, and presentation of the head to a third party. However, in this case, the threat to the faith community seems to come from inside. Nevertheless, the thematic parallel, was strong enough for the builders to back St Valerie's shrine in St. Michel des Lions with a fine stained glass window depicting John the Baptist.

== Cult ==
St Valerie was venerated alongside Martial and her alleged remains are buried alongside his at the Abbey of St Martial, in the city of Limoges. The original shrine was destroyed in a fire in the mid-10th century and a new building was erected. The reputed tomb of St Valerie under this building was among those uncovered in excavations under the Place de la République, Limoges, in 1960–62.

Around 985, at least part of the relics were transferred to the Benedictine abbey at Chambon-sur-Voueize, to the north-east of Limoges, which became a centre of her cult. A large 15th century painting of her martyrdom and a reliquary bust remain important centres of attention in the abbey. Images of the martyrdom became an important theme of Limousin art, both painting and sculpture, and later Limoges enamels.

After the destruction of the abbey at Limoges, the remaining relics of St Valerie were gathered together and installed alongside those of St Martial and St Loup of Limoges, in the Church of St. Michel des Lions, in the commercial heart of Limoges.

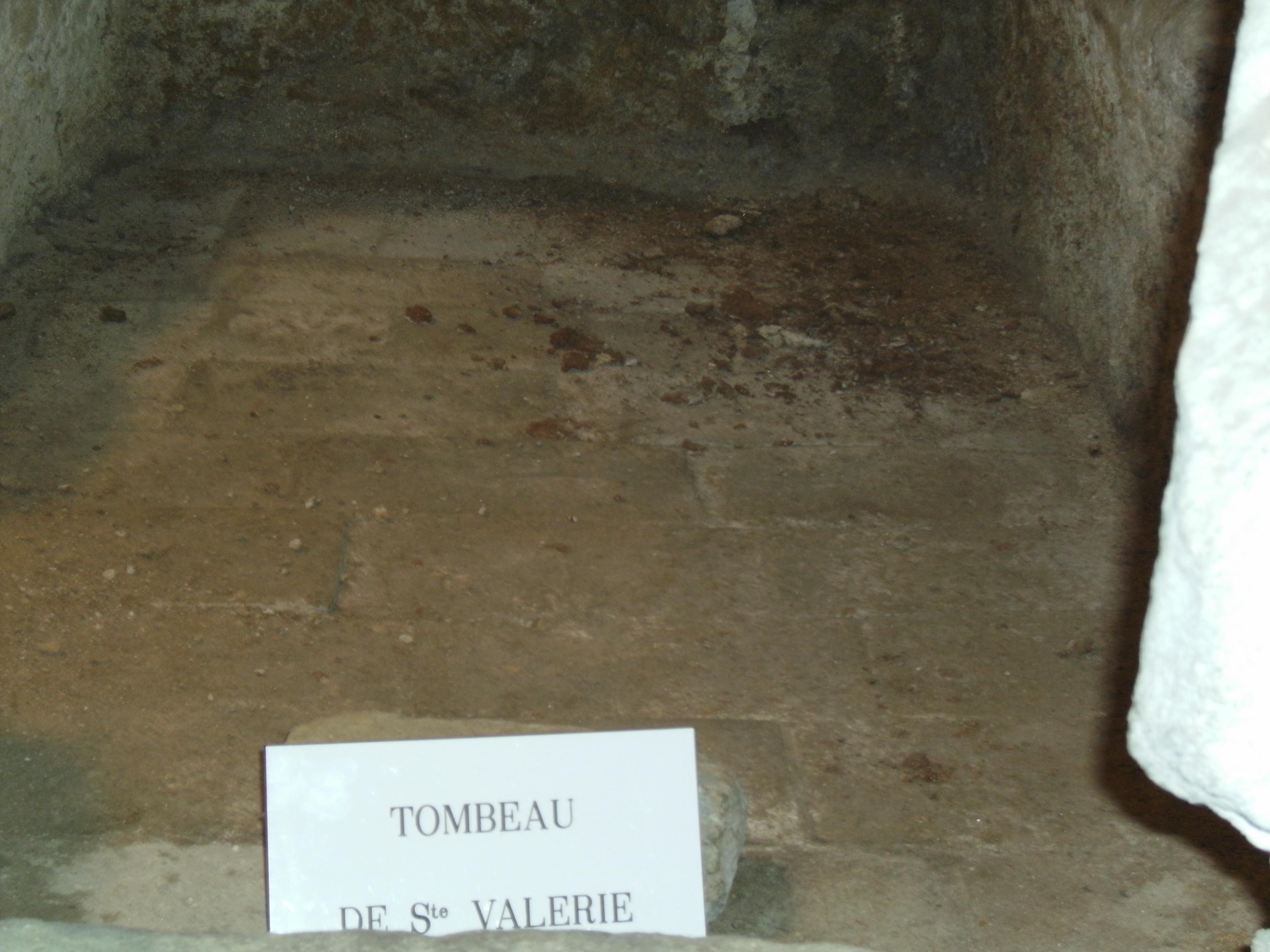
Tomb of St Valerie in the crypt beneath Place de la République, Limoges, formerly part of the abbey of St Martial

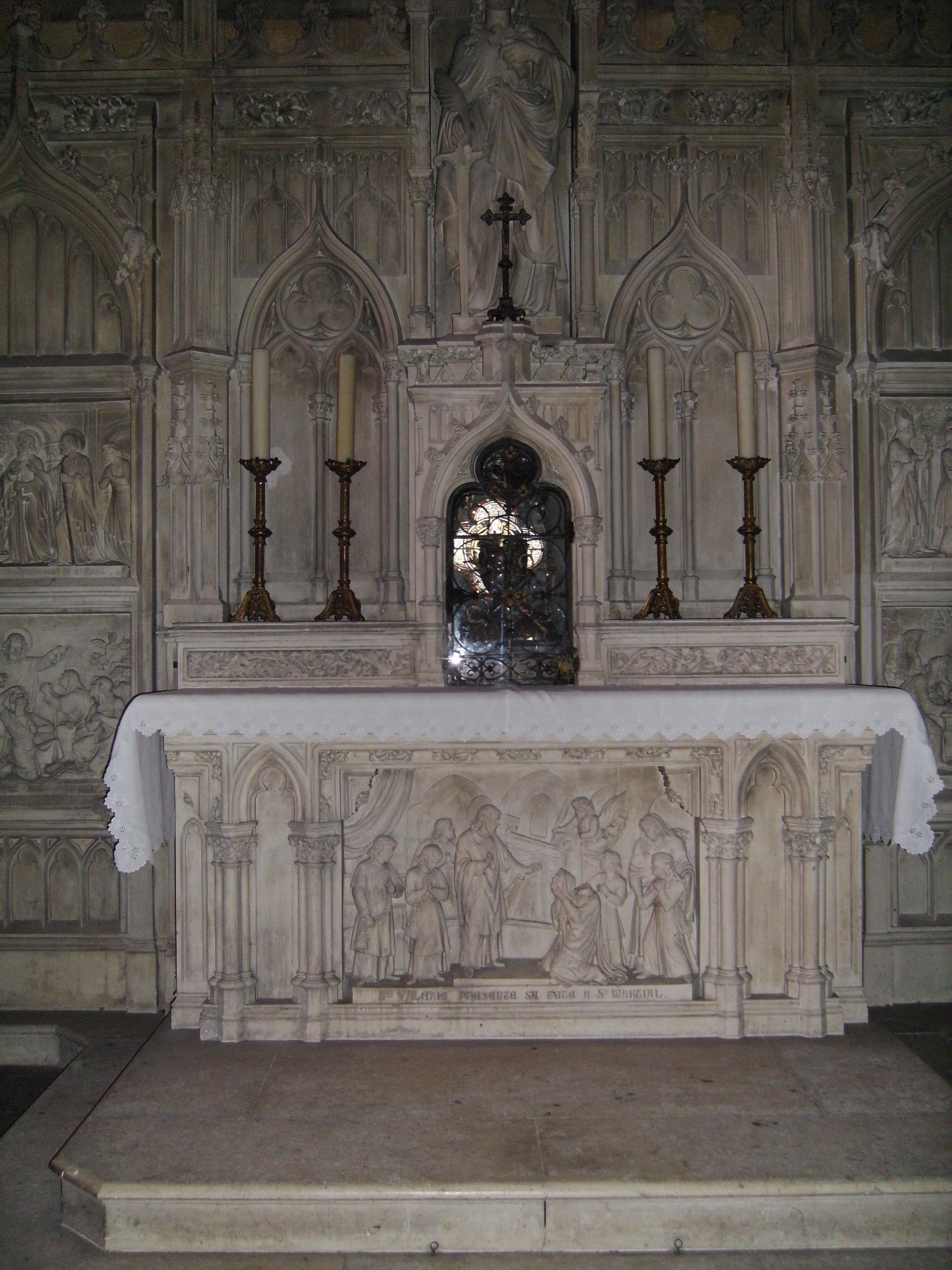
Shrine of St Valerie in the church of St Michel des Lions, Limoges
