= Abbey of Saint Martial, Limoges =

Monastery in Limoges, France

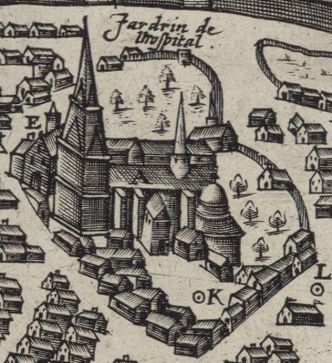
1594 drawing of Saint-Martial

The Abbey of Saint Martial (French: Abbaye Saint-Martial, Limoges; Limousin: Abadiá de Sent Marçau de Limòtges) was a monastery in Limoges, France, founded in 848 and dissolved in 1791.

The buildings were razed at the beginning of the 19th century. The only remaining part is the 10th-century crypt, which was rediscovered in 1960, and which contains the tomb of Saint Martial, the first bishop of Limoges, and also that of Saint Valerie of Limoges, another, possibly legendary, early martyr.

== Origins ==
The origins of the abbey lie in the graveyard outside the original Roman settlement of Augustoritum. This is the site of the Place de la République, at the commercial heart of modern Limoges. The cemetery was the reputed burial place of early Christian martyrs, including Saint Martial, the first bishop of Limoges. This evolved into a place of pilgrimage in Merovingian times. By the 6th century, according to Gregory of Tours, there was a funerary chapel above Saint Martial's tomb, in the care of a small community of clerics, who were recognised as a congregation of canons in the reign of the Carolingian ruler, Louis the Pious (814-840). This community became a Benedictine abbey in 848, under Charles the Bald. A mosaic above the tomb of Saint Martial dates from approximately this time, and is set in hard cement from an earlier period, indicating that the shrine was already well-established and of some antiquity by the time the abbey was founded.

== History ==
The abbey grew in importance and elaboration, alongside the "City of the Castle". This was a major commercial centre, under the patronage of the abbot, and outside the boundaries and control of the Cathedral City, dominated by the bishop. The body of Saint Martial was, at some time in the late 9th century, taken from its sarcophagus and placed for a time in a golden shrine in the great new church which was built over the spot. Here it was a magnet for pilgrims on the Way of St. James, benefiting from the wider pilgrim traffic throughout Western Europe.

The abbey reached the peak of its importance in the century following its take-over by Cluny Abbey in 1065, when it was famed for its literature and music. However, the shrine was stolen by Henry II of England, who was also the Duke of Aquitaine. Turmoil in the land was interpreted as the saint's response to the disturbance of his bones. The body was reburied and an altar placed above it.

The disturbances of the 12th century were followed by a period of rebuilding and a century of renewed prosperity. However, they had been only a foretaste of the destruction and disruption of the Hundred Years' War. The Limousin was not spared in the dynastic and religious conflicts of the 16th and 17th centuries. The abbey went through a protracted decline and it never recovered the greatness of its heyday.

There was considerable rebuilding and repair in the early 18th century. However, in 1791, during the French Revolution, the abbey community was dissolved, and in the following year the sacking and demolition of the building began. By 1807 this was complete. The area was levelled and turned into a new public space, the Place de la République. Portions of the relics of the martyrs, allegedly saved by faithful Catholic citizens of Limoges, were rehoused in the nearby church of St. Michel des Lions. The twin Castle and Cathedral cities were at last unified into a single municipality under secular governance.

Excavations were carried out from 1960, on the initiative of the city council, in the hope of uncovering the remains of the abbey and the shrine of Saint Martial. By 1962, the crypt containing the tombs of Saints Martial and Valerie had been rediscovered. Excavations were then pushed further to the east, revealing more church buildings belonging to the abbey. From 1966, the crypt with the surrounding area was consolidated and opened to the public, the whole being covered with a large concrete slab. Today, it is entered down a flight of steps from the Place de la République above. Admission is free.

Excavations started again in July 2015 to carry out detailed studies of the remains before revamping of the Place de la Republique.

== Music ==
The abbey was the center of several important developments in medieval music, including liturgical chant, early polyphony and troubadours' songs. The first chant manuscripts show revisions of the early 11th century, when Roger de Chabannes introduced his nephew Adémar as cantor and scriptor of notation. A significant body of plainchant and tonaries for its modal classification had been written at the scriptorium of this Abbey (among them Pa 909, 1120, 1121, 1132, 1240). Adémar de Chabannes composed not only sequences and prosulae, but also music for a festal octave for the Patron St Martial. He engaged in vain for the recognition of St Martial as an apostle, which was the only condition to celebrate the patron a whole week long. Among the earliest sequences composed there is the Swan Sequence from c.850 (Pa 1139). The St. Martial school of music and its library contributed and collected an almost complete repertoire of West Frankish tropes and sequences, as well as the so-called Aquitanian polyphony (Pa 1139, 3549, 3719), because cantors of the region had been most inventive in quite original compositions, dealing with all kinds of troped poetry, and two part settings between discant and florid organum.

It is a famous site for 12th century sacred and secular church music. Some of the earliest troubadour lyrics with their accompanying melodies were extant in manuscripts at St. Martial's, now preserved at the Bibliothèque Nationale.

== Gallery ==
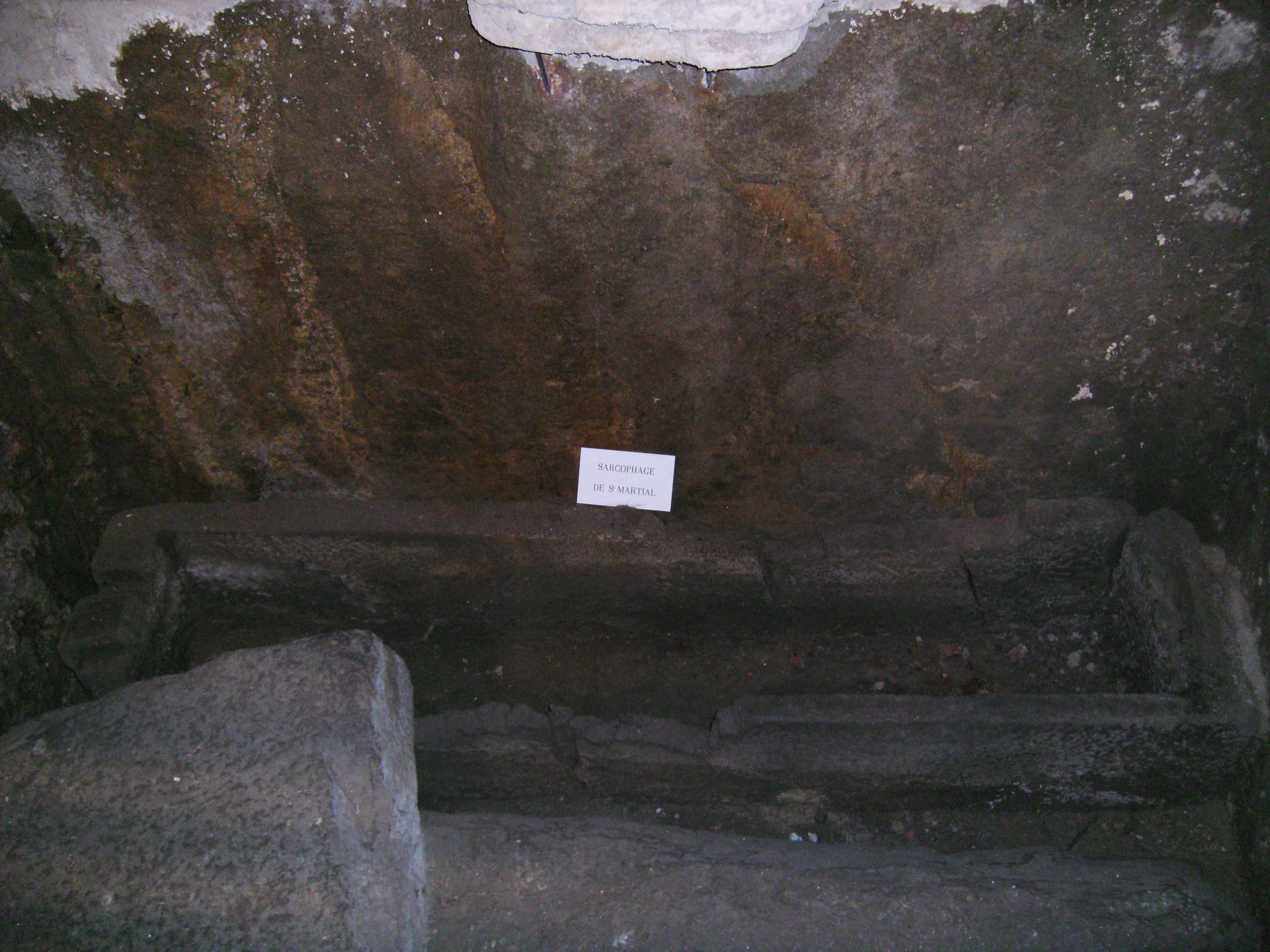
Sarcophagus of Saint Martial, focus of the medieval cult, in the crypt beneath the modern Place de la République.

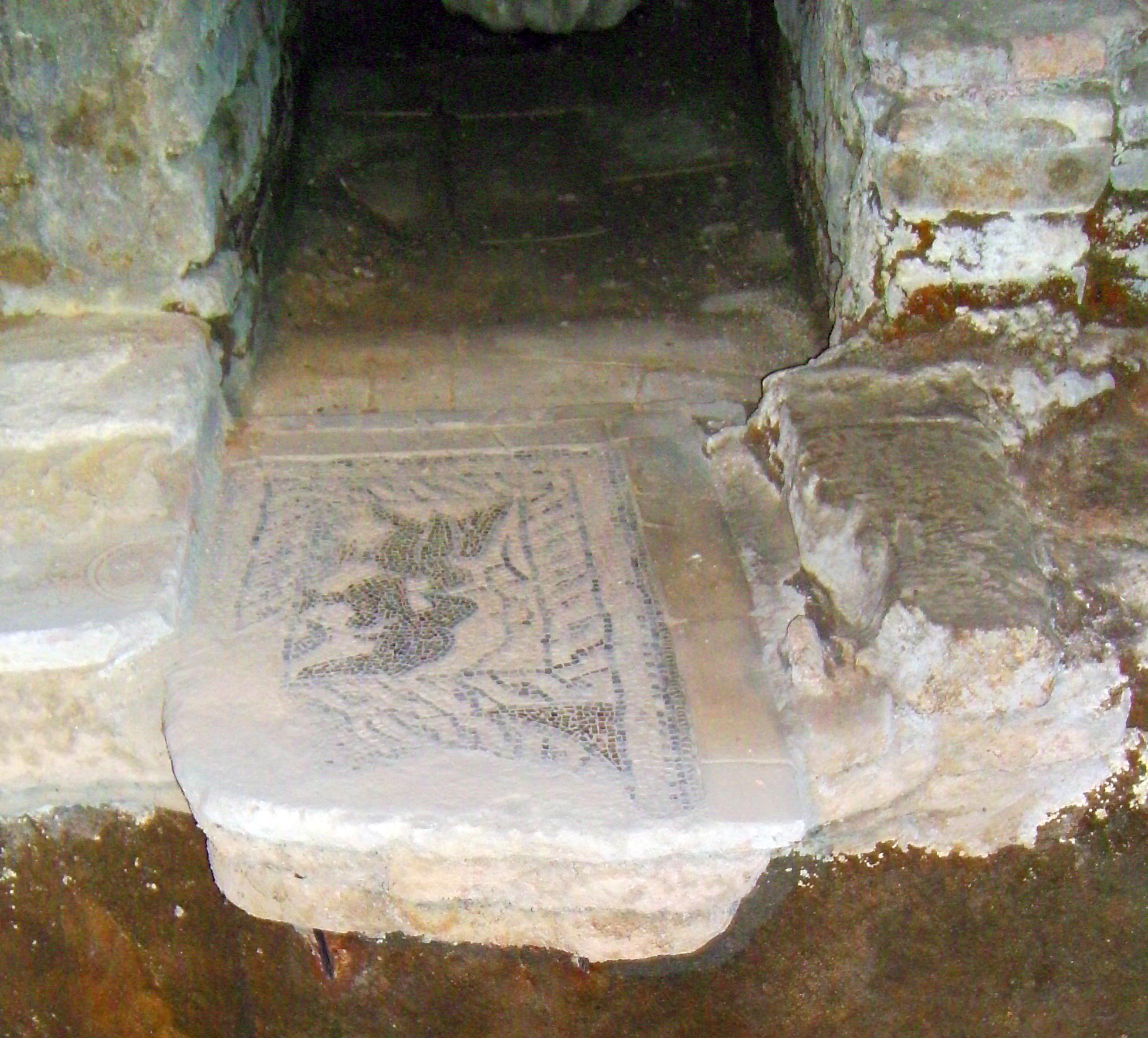
Mosaic depicting birds drinking from a cup, symbol of eternal life, above the sarcophagus of Saint Martial.

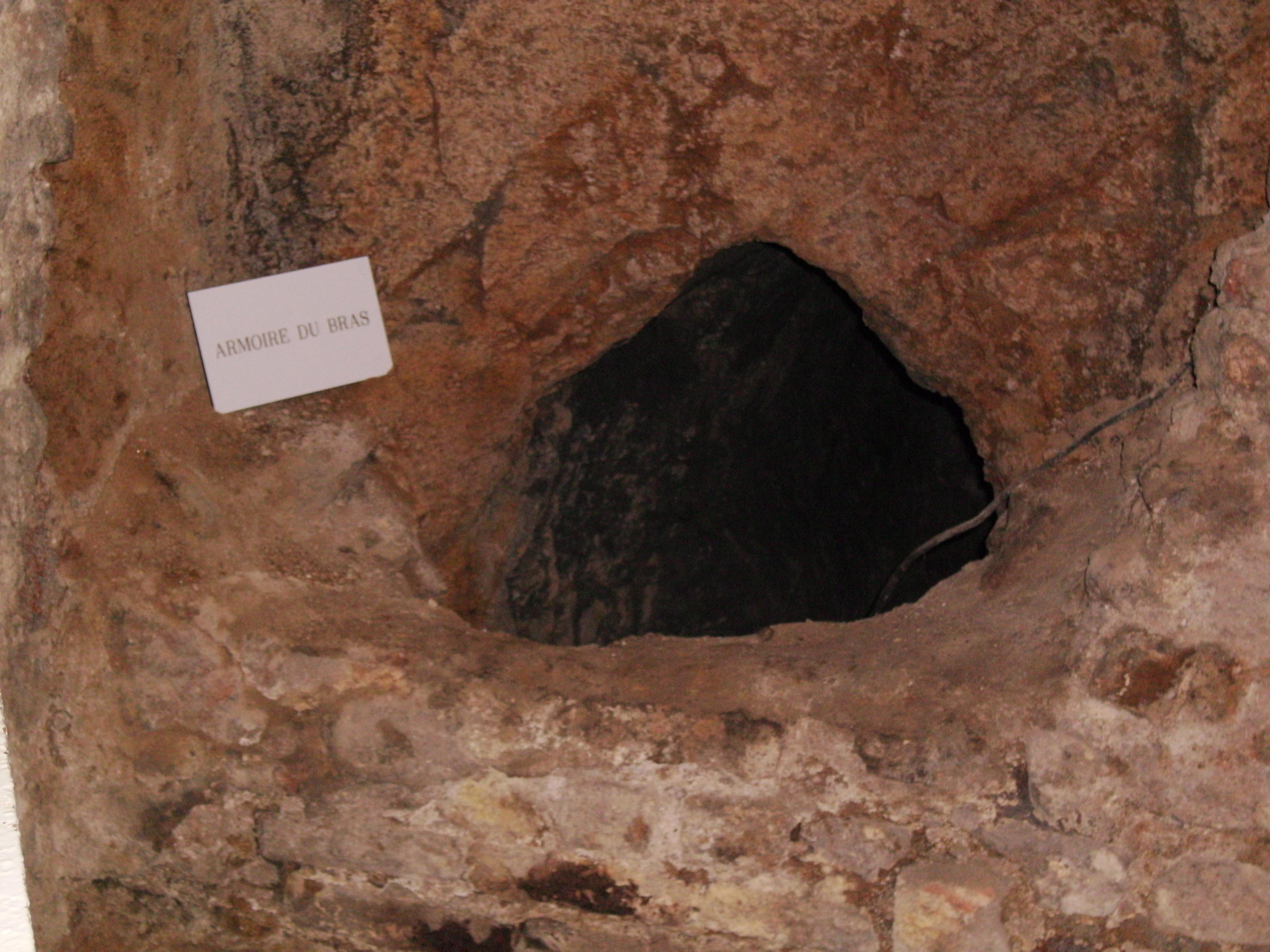
Cupboard of the Arm, a medieval reliquary in the crypt.

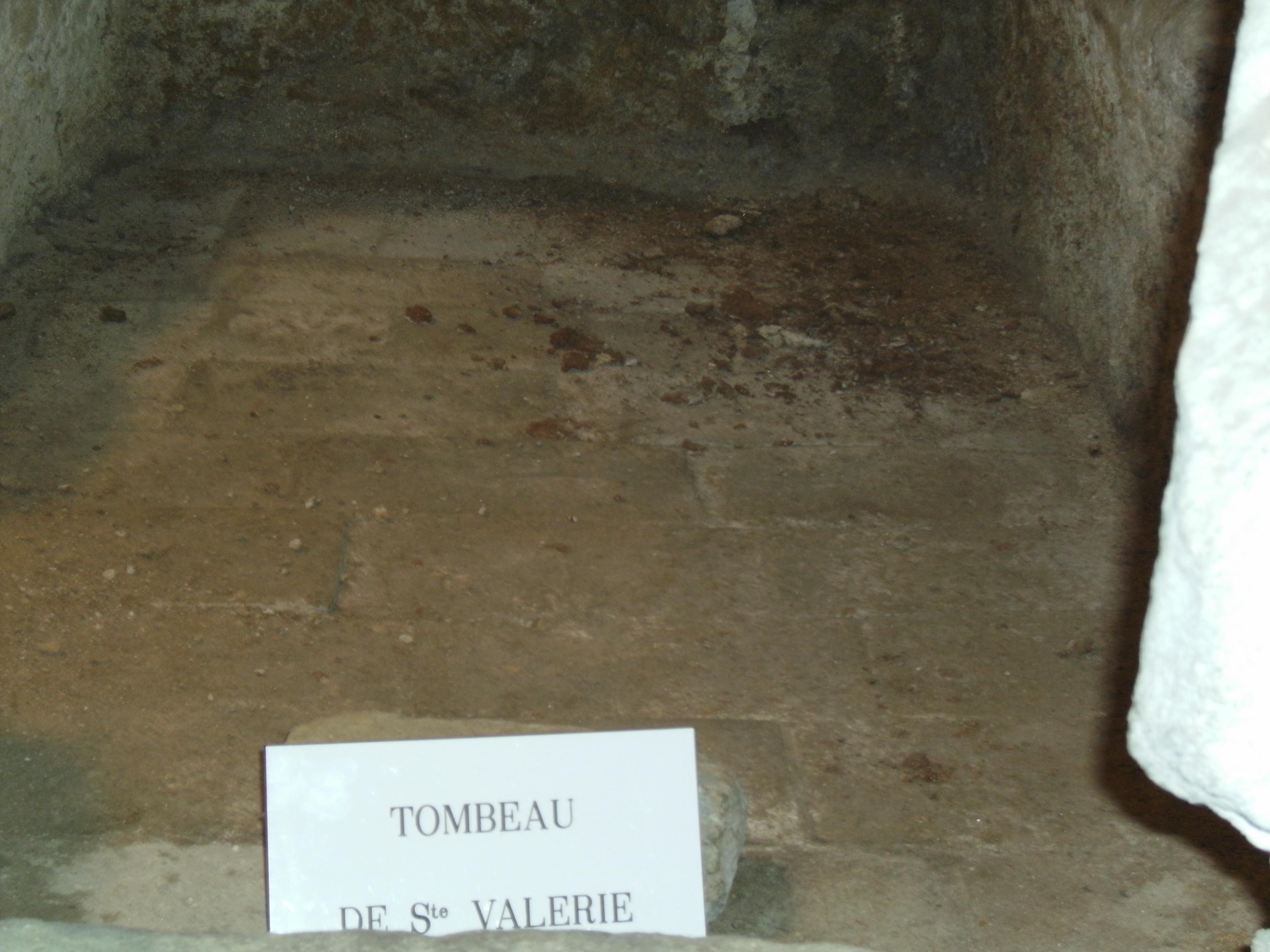
Tomb of Saint Valerie of Limoges, an associate of Saint Martial.

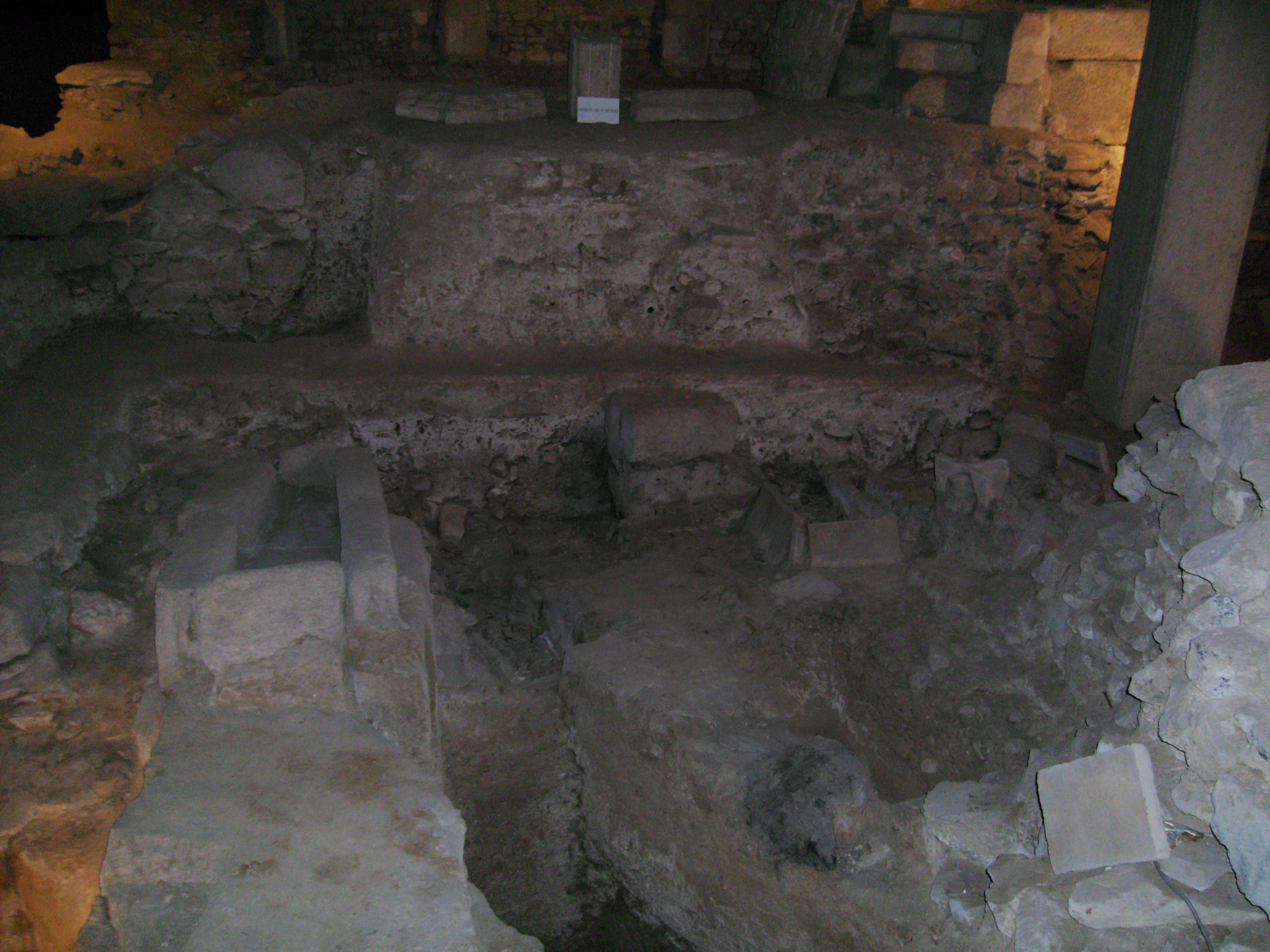
Chapel of Saint Benedict, part of the crypt complex, and dating mostly from the 13th century.

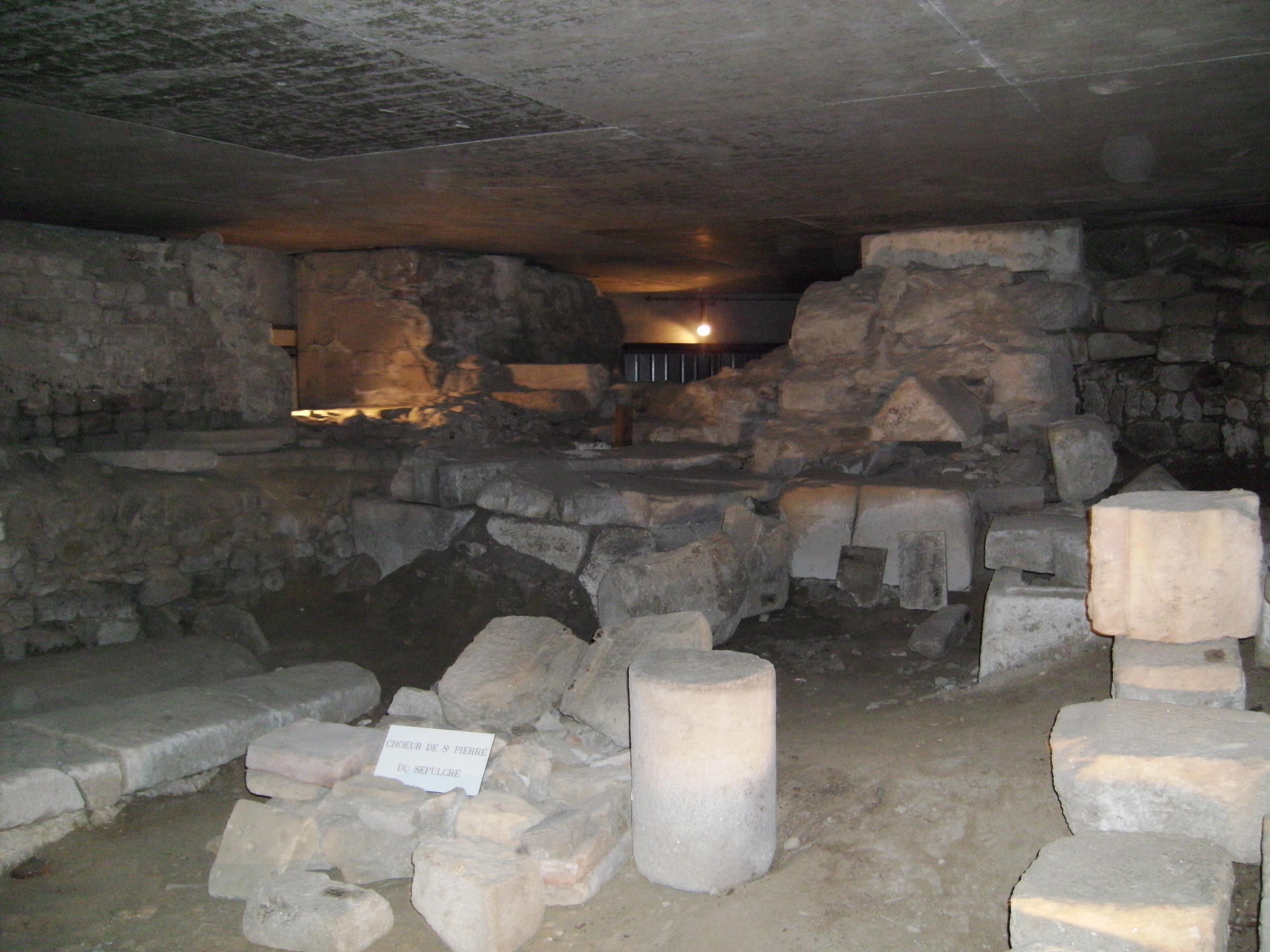
Choir of Saint Peter of the Sepulchre, the original church at the shrine, rebuilt in the 10th century and much modified in later centuries.

== Studies ==
- Grier, James (2003). "The music is the message: music in the apostolic liturgy of Saint Martial". Plainsong and Medieval Music. 12 (1): 1–14. doi:10.1017/S0961137103003012. ISSN 0961-1371. S2CID 162554319.
- Grier, James (2005). "The Musical Autographs of Adémar de Chabannes (989–1034)". Early Music History. 24: 125–168. doi:10.1017/S0261127905000100. S2CID 194078301.
- Grier, James (2006). "The music is the message II: Adémar de Chabannes' music for the apostolic Office of Saint Martial". Plainsong and Medieval Music. 15 (1): 43–54. doi:10.1017/S0961137106000246. ISSN 0961-1371. S2CID 162870563.

== Sources ==
- "Paris, Bibliothèque Nationale, fonds lat., Ms. 909". Troper, Sequentiary, and Tonary of St. Martial de Limoges (1028).
- "Paris, Bibliothèque Nationale, fonds lat., Ms. 1085". Abridged Antiphonary from the church St. Salvator Mundi, St. Martial Abbey in Limoges with later additions for the patron Saint Martial by Adémar de Chabannes (late 10th century).
- "Paris, Bibliothèque Nationale, fonds lat., Ms. 1120". Troper, Proser, Processional of St. Martial de Limoges (late 10th century).
- "Paris, Bibliothèque Nationale, fonds lat., Ms. 1121". Troper, Sequentiary, and Tonary of St. Martial de Limoges, Adémar de Chabannes (ca. 1025).
- "Paris, Bibliothèque nationale, fonds latin, ms. 1132". Gradual-Proser of the Abbey Saint-Martial at Limoges (late 11th century).
- "Paris, Bibliothèque Nationale, fonds lat., Ms. 1139". Prosae (4 series), historical documents, versus and Benedicamus tropes (some polyphonic), medieval dramas, troped kyries and Marian Offices, Abbey Saint-Martial of Limoges (late 12th, early 13th century).
- "Paris, Bibliothèque Nationale, fonds lat., Ms. 1240". Troper from the church St. Salvator Mundi, St. Martial Abbey in Limoges with later additions neumes, a tonary and an octave for the patron Saint Martial by Adémar de Chabannes (933-936).
- "Paris, Bibliothèque Nationale, fonds lat., Ms. 3549". Fragments (conducts, tropes, sequences) of the Abbey Saint-Martial of Limoges (second half 12th century).
- "Paris, Bibliothèque Nationale, fonds lat., Ms. 3719". Sequences, conducts, tropes of Benedicamus, Sanctus and Kyrie, Office of the Virgin (ff. 93r-108v) at the Abbey Saint-Martial of Limoges (12th and 13th century).

- This article is based mainly on the English-language version of the guide to the excavated site, available free to visitors.
