= Church of St. Michel des Lions =

Church of St. Michael of the Lions
- French: Église Saint-Michel-des-Lions; Occitan: Egleisa de Sent Micheu daus Lions
- Church of St. Michael of the Lions
- 45°49′50″N 01°15′25″E
- Location: Limoges, Haute-Vienne
- Country: France
- Denomination: Roman Catholic

Architecture
- Style: Gothic
- Years built: 14th–16th-centuries

Monument historique
- Official name: Église Saint-Michel-des-Lions
- Type: Classé
- Designated: 27 January 1909
- Reference no.: PA00100343

The church of Saint Michel des Lions (French: église Saint-Michel-des-Lions; Limousin Occitan: egleisa de Sent Micheu daus Lions) is one of the main churches in Limoges, Haute-Vienne, France. It derives its name from the two Gallo-Roman stone lions that stand guard at the entrance of the building.

== History ==
Around 630, Saint Loup, bishop of Limoges, bestowed St. Michel's Chapel to the canons of St. Martial. The church was destroyed by two successive fires in 1123 and 1147 and was re-built by monk Pierre de Verteuil. It was consecrated in 1213. But the building collapsed and the foundation stone of another church was laid in 1364. Only two chapels and some walls remain from the church of 1364. In 1552, the church was extended and a new bay with glass walls were added to the west side. Other works were made in the following centuries, mainly on the bell tower in 1604, 1754, 1810, etc.

== Description ==
This Gothic church from the 14th and 16th centuries has a typical Limousin bell tower (as the Limoges Cathedral) topped by a metal ball.

In 1810, lightning struck the bell tower and damaged the building. The soldier in charge of the renovation of the spire wanted to install a ball atop the bell tower "to facilitate triangulation operations and geodetic measures". This ball weighs 600 kg and is 2 meters wide. Indeed, the ball endangered the building because it had a high wind factor. Renovation works were launched, and the presence of the ball was controversial among the inhabitants. With the authorization of the Ministry of Fine Arts, a new ball was supposed to replace the older one, but the First World War broke out. The new copper ball was finally installed after the end of the War. It stands next to the weathercock which has never been moved since 1824.

The church was listed as a Historic Monument in 1909.

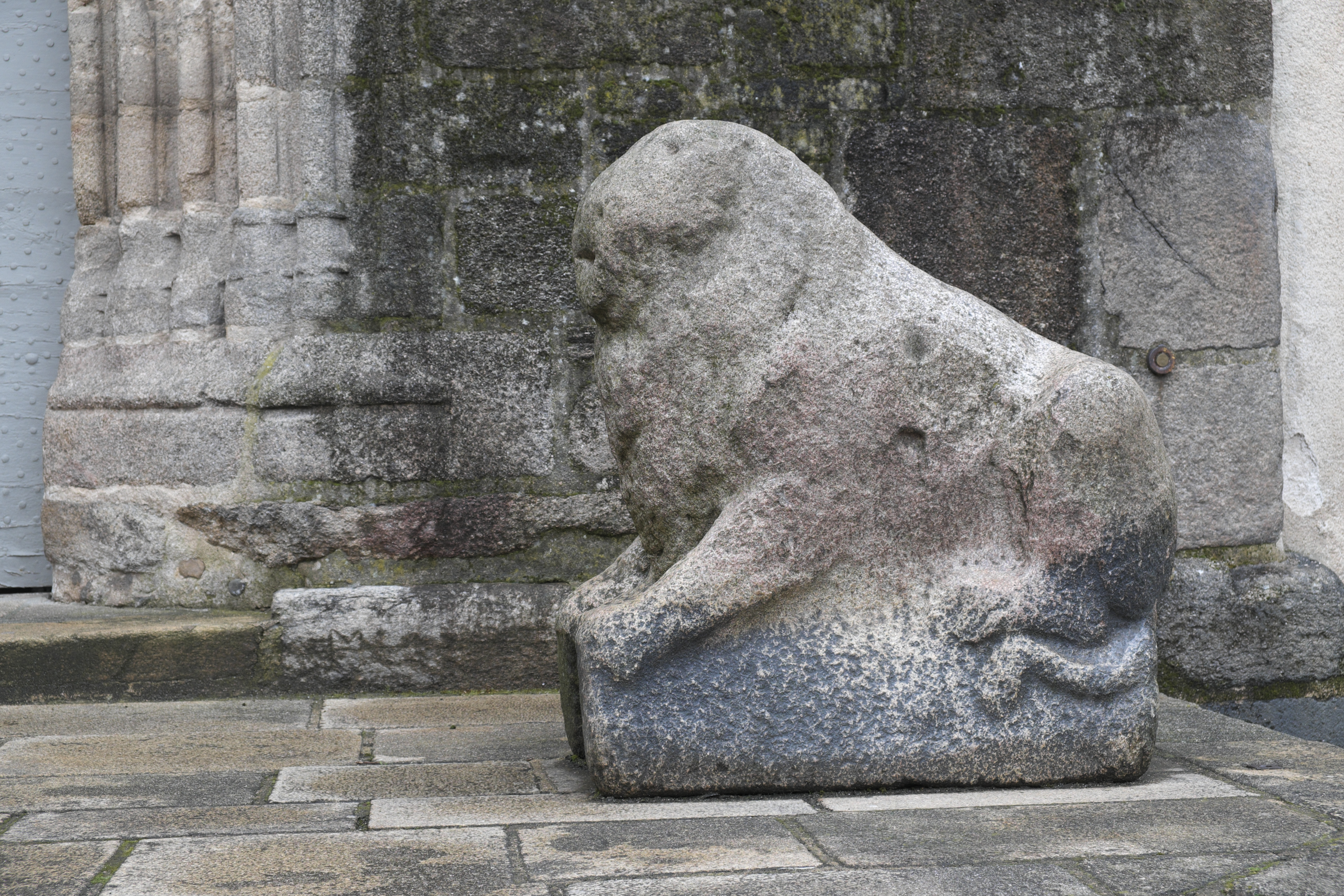
One of the two lions at the entrance of the church

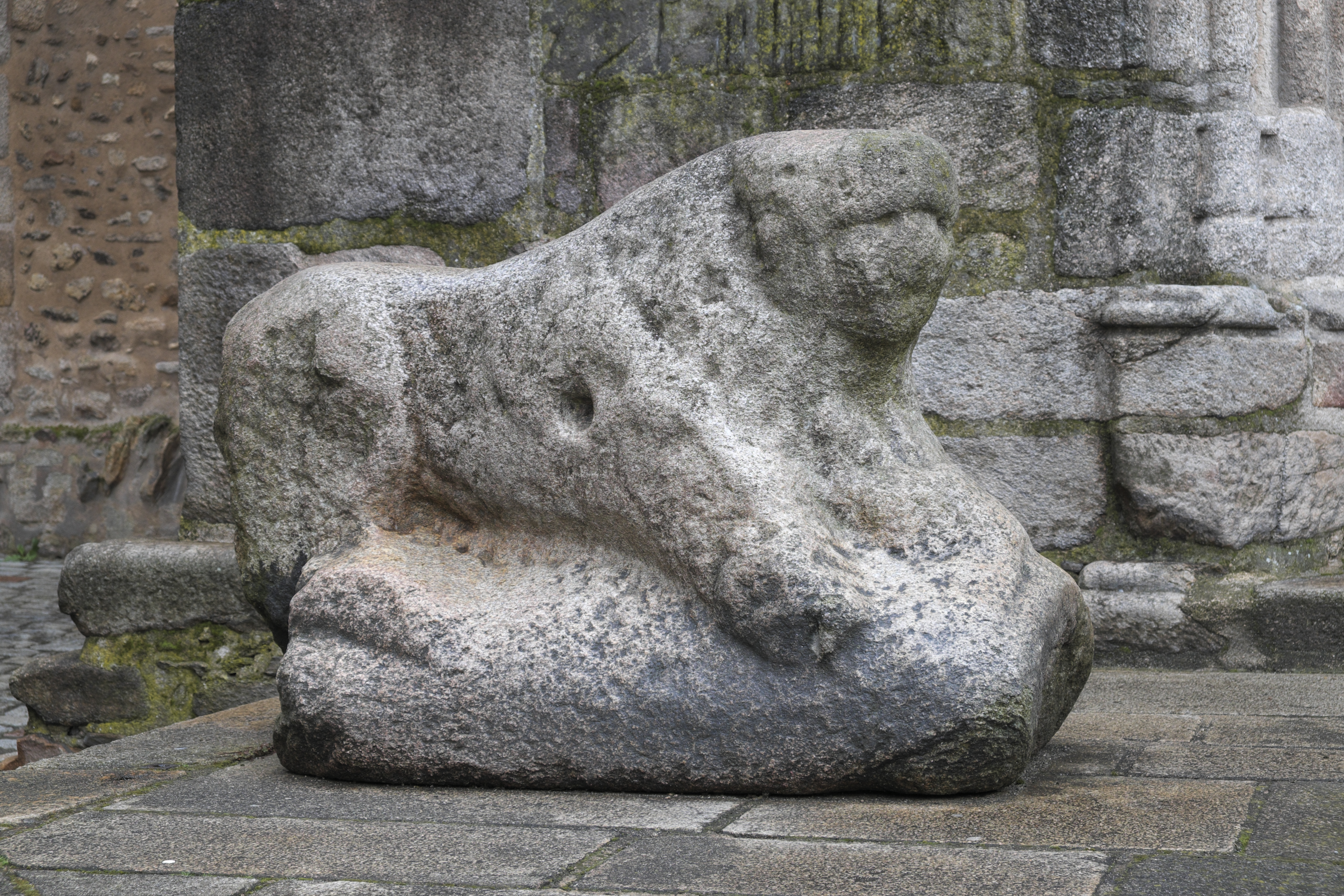
The other lion

== Interior ==
The church hosts the relics of Saint Martial, whose worship is organised by the brotherhoods Grande confrérie de saint Martial and the Confrérie des Porteurs de la Châsse. Besides, the church hosts the relics of Saint Loup and Saint Valerie, to which two other brotherhoods are dedicated. These relics are preserved in a 19th-century altarpiece that celebrates the miracles of Saint Martial.

Moreover, the church has rich furniture, among which:

- Two pietàs of the 15th century;
- Two 15th-century stained-glass windows that represent the lives of Saint John the Baptist and of the Virgin Mary;
- A 15th-century statues of Saint Valerie.
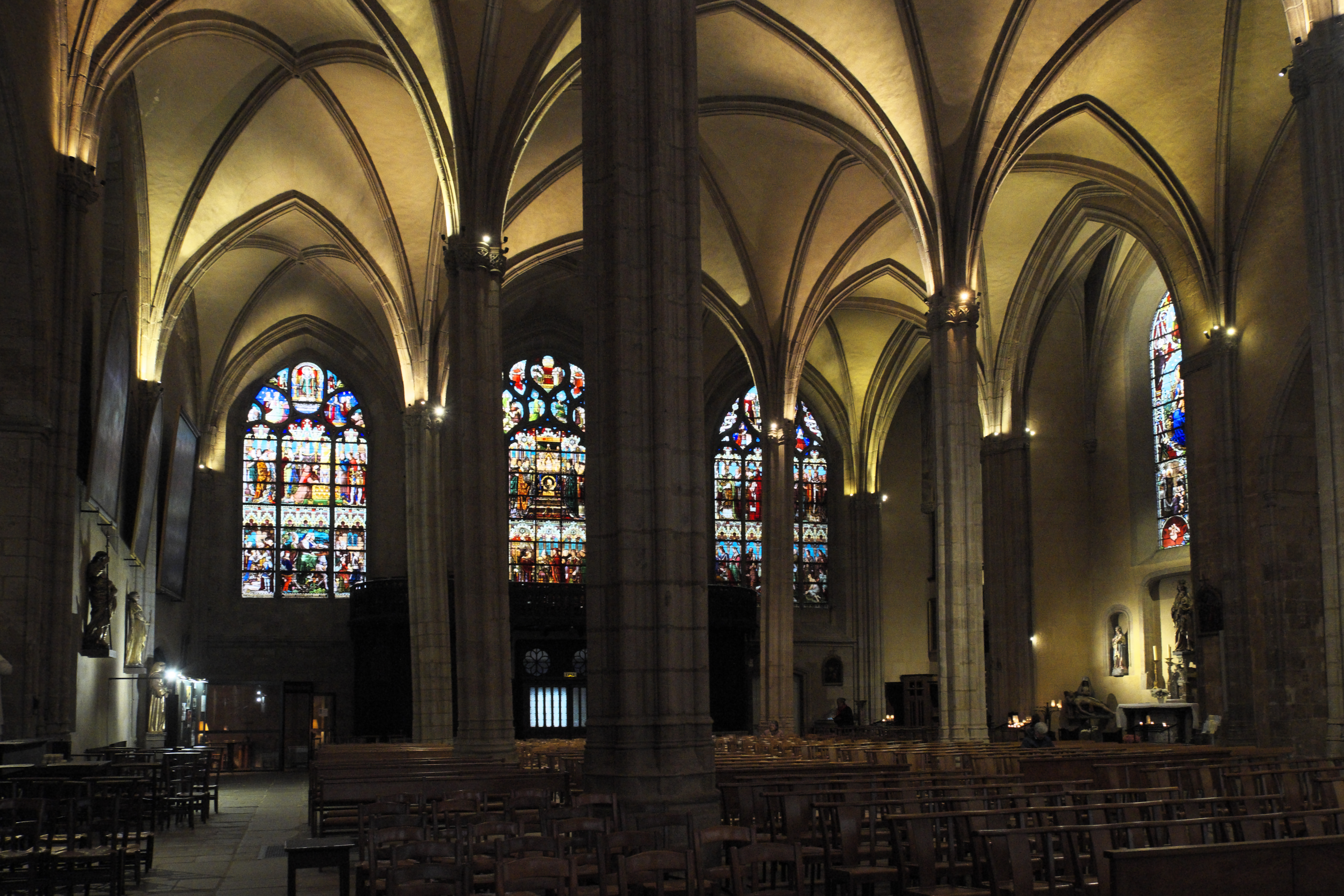
The interior of the church

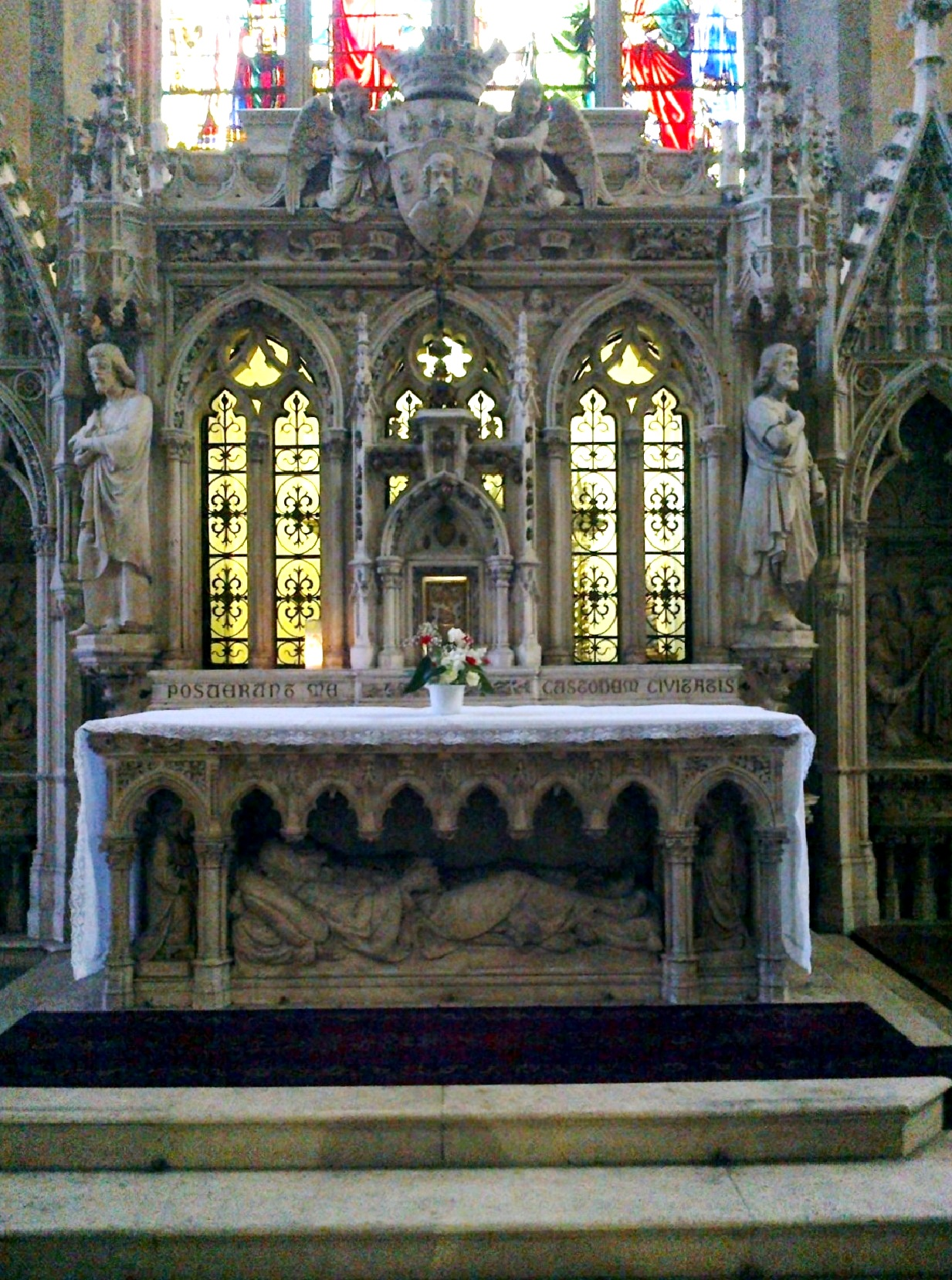
The shrine of Saint Martial

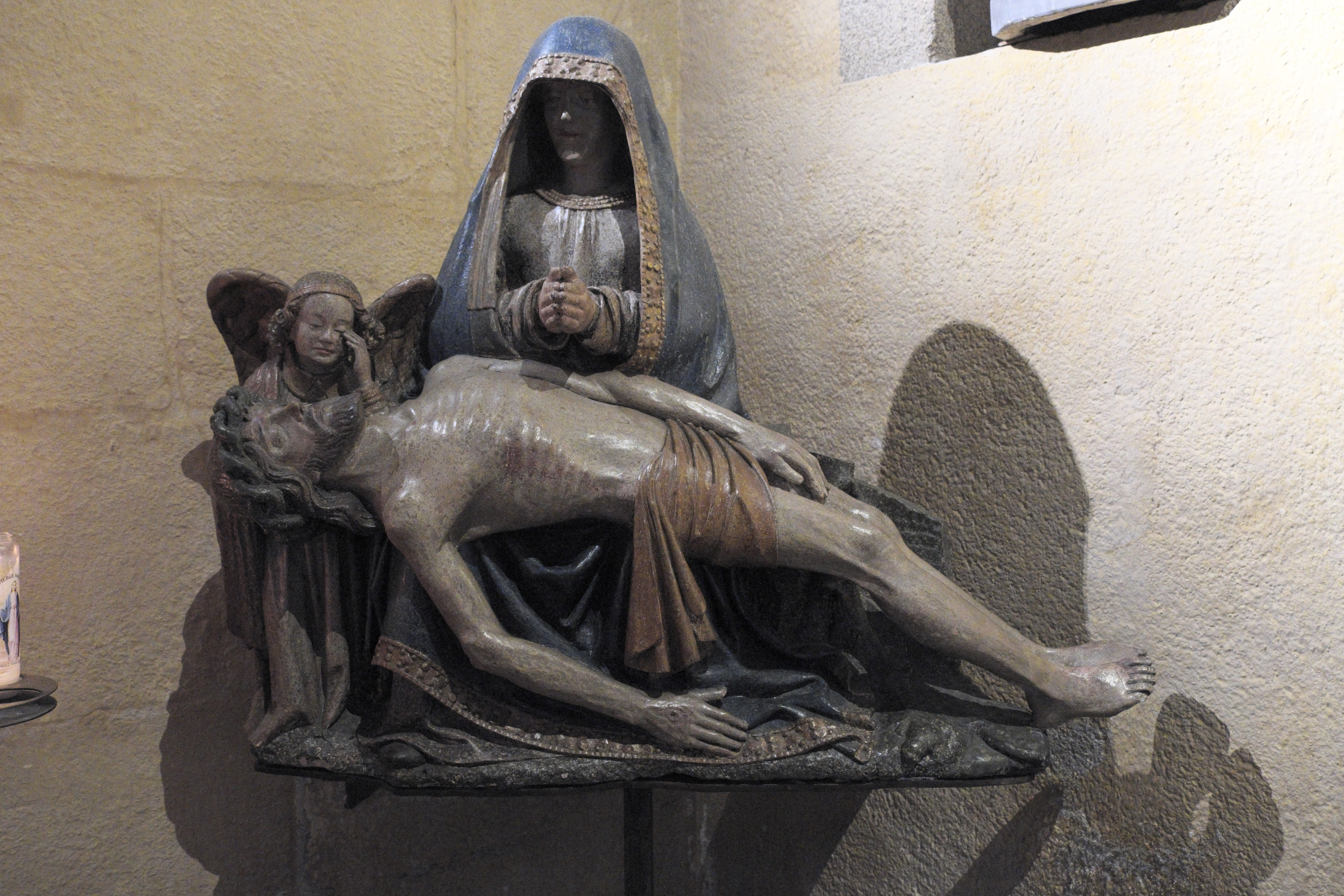
A pietà

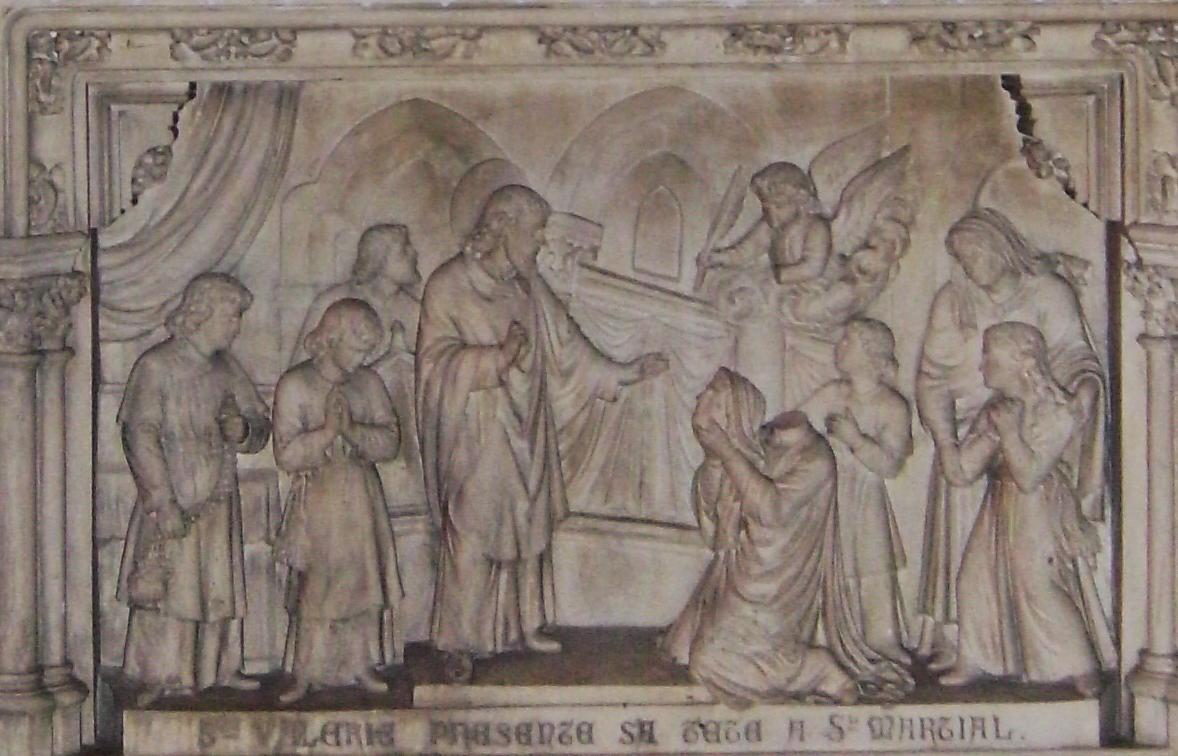
Saint Valerie and Saint Martial

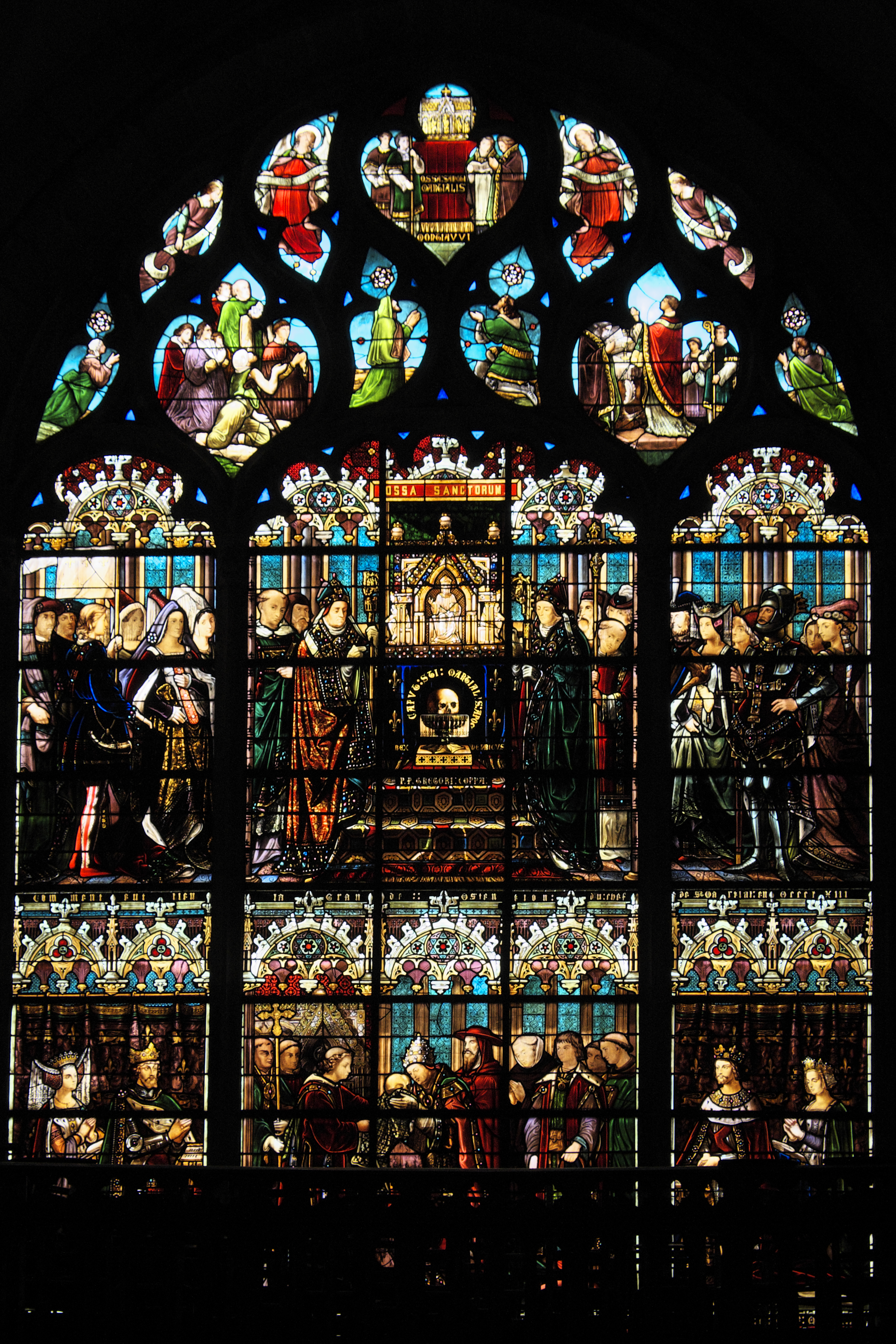
A stained-glass window

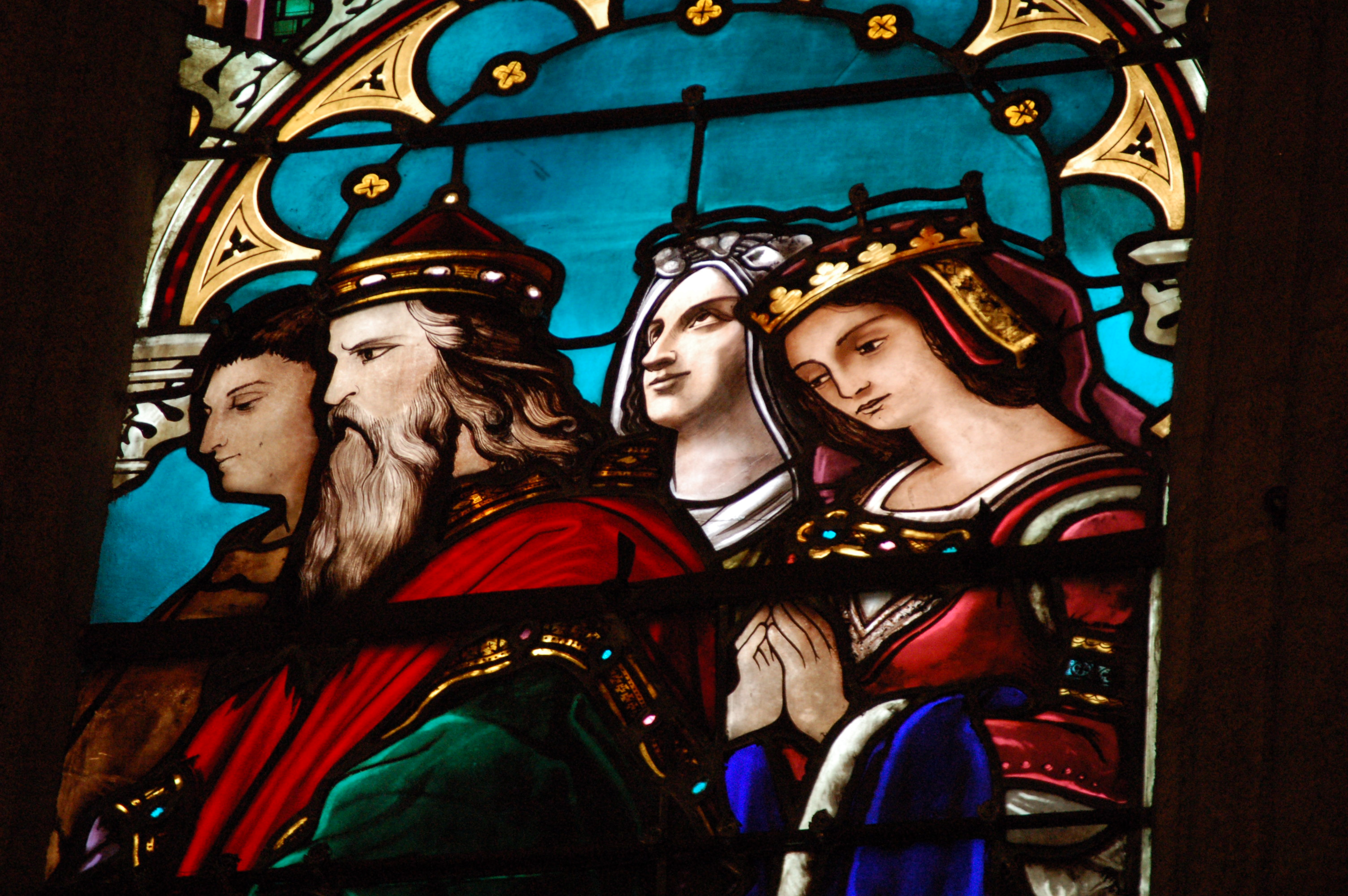
Detail of the stained glass

== Bibliography ==
- St Michel des Lions Limoges XIVe XVe siècles, 3rd edition. Limoges: Imprimerie Touron et fils, 3rd quarter 1980 (1st edition 1953; 2nd edition 1967).
- Andrault-Schmitt, Claude (2016). "Limoges, église Saint-Michel-des-Lions". Congrès archéologique de France, 172e session, Haute-Vienne romane et gothique. L'âge d'or de son architecture. 2014 (in French). Société française d'archéologie. pp. 157–171. ISBN 978-2-901837-61-9.
