= Charles De Smedt =

Belgian Jesuit priest and hagiographer

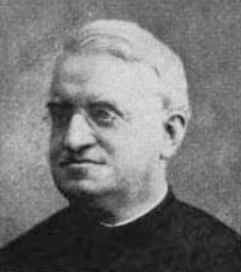
- Born: 6 April 1833; Ghent, Belgium
- Died: 4 March 1911 (aged 77); Brussels, Belgium
- Education: College of Our Lady of Peace
- Occupations: Clergyman, educator

Charles De Smedt (6 April 1833 – 4 March 1911) was a Belgian Jesuit priest and hagiographer. He was a Bollandist, and is noted for having introduced critical historical methods into Catholic hagiography, so that it became a collection of accounts of the accretion of legends, as well as the compilation of original materials.

== Life ==
Charles De Smedt was born in Ghent, Belgium on 6 April 1833. He studied at the College of St. Barbara in Ghent, and then at the College of Our Lady of Peace in Namur, continuing his studies at Tronchiennes. He entered the Society of Jesus in 1851.

De Smedt was a professor of literature and mathematics at Tronchiennes; he was ordained in 1862. He became a professor of Church History and of dogmatic theology at Louvain. In 1870 he joined the staff of the Acta Sanctorum in Brussels. He revived the Bollandist Society and founded it scholarly journal, the Analecta Bollandiana in 1882 with G. van Hooff and Joseph de Backer. From 1899 to 1902 De Smedt served as the acting rector at St. Michael's College in Brussels.

He is best known for his contribution to hagiography but also to history and metaphysics. His contribution to the development of a critical approach to History is epitomized in his masterpiece: Principes de la critique historique, which greatly influenced Friedrich von Hügel.

He died in Brussels on 4 March 1911.

== Works ==
- Introductio generalis ad historiam ecclesiasticam critice tractandam, (Paris, 1876).
- L'Église et la science (1877), early reply to the conflict thesis
- Gesta episcoporum Cameracensium, (Paris, 1880).
- Principes de la critique historique, Bruxelles, 1883.
- "The Bollandists." in the Catholic Encyclopedia, 1907.

== Honors ==
- Foreign Correspondent of the Académie des Inscriptions et Belles-Lettres, Institut de France
- Foreign Correspondent of the Royal Academy of Madrid
- Honorary member of the Royal Academy of Ireland
- Officer of the Order of Leopold "pro ecclesia et pontifice"
