= 880s =

Decade

The 880s decade ran from January 1, 880, to December 31, 889.

== Events ==
=== 880 ===
==== By place ====
====== Byzantine Empire ======
- Battle of Cephalonia: A Byzantine fleet, under Admiral Nasar, is sent by Emperor Basil I to the Ionian Islands. Nasar defeats the Aghlabids in a night battle near Cephalonia (modern Greece).
- May 1 – The Nea Ekklesia is inaugurated in Constantinople, by Patriarch Photius I, setting the model for all later cross-in-square Orthodox churches.

====== Europe ======
- February 2 – Battle of Lüneburg Heath: King Louis III is defeated by the Norse Great Heathen Army at Lüneburg Heath. The Saxons are routed in a snowstorm; many drown in the river or are captured during the retreat.
- Battle of Thimeon: King Louis III ("the Younger") defeats Vikings (probably Norsemen) from England, near Charleroi, north of the River Sambre. During the battle 5,000 Vikings are killed.
- Battle of Fjaler: King Harald Fairhair moves east along the Norwegian coast with his fleet. He defeats his rival Atle Mjove at Fjaler in Sunnfjord, and lands with his longships at Tønsberg.
- December – Treaty of Ribemont: Louis the Younger and the kings of the West Frankish Kingdom sign a treaty. The young Frankish monarch, Louis III, is reduced to merely Neustria.
- Lambert I, duke of Spoleto, dies while besieging the city of Capua. He is succeeded by his son Guy II.
- The oldest known mention is made of the city of Dortmund (approximate date).

====== Asia ======
- Fujiwara no Mototsune, Japanese statesman, creates the position of regent (kampaku) for himself. The Fujiwara clan will be able to dominate the government for more than 3 centuries.
- December 22 – Luoyang, eastern Chinese capital of the Dynasty, is captured by rebel leader Huang Chao, during the reign of emperor Xi Zong.

==== By topic ====
====== Religion ======
- Pope John VIII issues the bull Industriae Tuae, creating an independent ecclesiastical province in Great Moravia, with archbishop Methodius as its head. Old Church Slavonic is recognized as the fourth liturgical language, besides Latin, Greek and Hebrew.
- The first known Christian bishopric in Slovakia is established in the city of Nitra, with Wiching as bishop.

=== 881 ===
==== By place ====
====== Europe ======
- February 12 – King Charles the Fat, the third son of the late Louis the German, is crowned as Holy Roman Emperor by Pope John VIII at Rome.
- August 3 – Battle of Saucourt-en-Vimeu: The West Frankish kings Louis III, and his brother Carloman II, rout Viking raiders (near Abbeville).

====== Britain ======
- Battle of the Conwy: King Anarawd of Gwynedd (Wales) initiates a revenge attack on the Mercian armies, and defeats them on the River Conwy.
- Anarawd, and his brothers Cadell and Merfyn, begin extensive military campaigns to quell resistance in Powys and Seisyllwg (approximate date).

====== Arabian Empire ======
- Zanj Rebellion: Abbasid general Al-Muwaffaq lays siege to the Zanj capital of Mukhtara, using his base on the opposite side of the River Tigris.

====== Asia ======
- Bakong, the first temple mountain of sandstone, is constructed by rulers of the Khmer Empire (modern Cambodia) at Angkor.
- 881 Acre earthquake: It takes place in the vicinity of Acre. Alexandria is reportedly affected by the same earthquake.

==== By topic ====
====== Religion ======
- St. Cecilia's Church (Cäcilienkirche) is founded as a college for women. It is now home of the Schnütgen Museum in Cologne.

=== 882 ===
==== By place ====
====== Europe ======
- January 20 – King Louis the Younger dies in Frankfurt. He leaves his territory to his younger brother, Emperor Charles the Fat, who becomes sole ruler of the East Frankish Kingdom.
- April 11 – Battle of Remich: A Frankish army under Bishop Wala of Metz is defeated by Vikings, who are on a raid, near Remich (modern Luxembourg). During the fighting Wala is killed.
- Siege of Asselt: Charles the Fat besieges a Viking camp, who have plundered along the Meuse, the Rhine and the Moselle. He defeats their leader Godfrid, and grants him West Frisia.
- August 5 – King Carloman II becomes sole ruler of the West Frankish Kingdom, after the accidental death of his brother, Louis III. His power is limited by rebellious nobles in Burgundy.
- Oleg of Novgorod takes Kyiv, and makes it his capital, forming the Kievan Rus'.

====== Britain ======
- King Alfred the Great increases the size of his new navy, and sails out to attack four Viking ships. Two of the ships are captured (before they surrender), and the other crews are killed.

====== Arabian Empire ======
- December – Ishaq ibn Kundaj, a Turkic military leader, arrests the Abbasid caliph Al-Mu'tamid, when the latter (and his followers) try to flee into Tulunid territory.

==== By topic ====
====== Religion ======
- December 16 – Pope John VIII is assassinated at Rome after a 10-year reign, probably the victim of a political conspiracy. He is succeeded by Marinus I, as the 108th pope of the Catholic Church.

=== 883 ===
==== By place ====
====== Europe ======
- Spring – Viking raiders ravage Flanders, and sack the abbey at Saint-Quentin. King Carloman II blocks their passage at Laviers, which had been on the banks of the Somme. Meanwhile, Vikings enter the Rhine, but are turned back by Henry of Franconia (possibly a margrave of Saxony). They over-winter at Duisburg.
- King Charles the Fat travels to Nonantola (Northern Italy), where he meets Pope Marinus I. He receives complaints of Guy II of Spoleto, who is the official "protector" of Rome, and invades the Papal States. King Charles orders Guy to appear before a tribunal.
- Guy II of Spoleto begins a revolt, and assembles an army supported with Arab auxiliaries. King Charles the Fat sends Berengar of Friuli with an expeditionary force to deprive him of Spoleto. An epidemic ravages Berengar's army, and forces them to retire.
- Svatopluk I, ruler (knyaz) of Great Moravia, conquers Lower Pannonia (today's Southwestern Hungary and Northern Croatia), during the succession strife in the East Frankish Kingdom (approximate date).
- The first historic document (written by Regino of Prüm) mentions Duisburg.

====== Arabian Empire ======
- The Zanj Rebellion: Abbasid general Al-Muwaffaq brings in Egyptian forces, to help him in his two-year siege of the Zanj capital Mukhtara. He captures the city, and crushes the revolt that has devastated Chaldea (modern Iraq) since 869.
- September 11 – Yazaman al-Khadim, Abbasid governor of Tarsus, routs a Byzantine army under general Kesta Styppiotes, in a night attack. According to Arab chroniclers, 70,000 out of 100,000 Byzantine troops are killed.

=== 884 ===
==== By place ====
====== Europe ======
- March 1 – Diego Rodríguez Porcelos, count of Castile, founds and repopulates (repoblación) Burgos and Ubierna (Northern Spain), under the mandate of King Alfonso III of Asturias.
- Summer – King Carloman II reverts to the former fall-back of 'pay and pray', buying (with Danegeld) a truce at Amiens, while he raises 12,000 lbs of silver for the Vikings to depart.
- December 12 – Carloman II dies after a hunting accident. He is succeeded by his cousin, Emperor Charles the Fat, who for the last time reunites the Frankish Empire.

====== Britain ======
- King Æthelred II of Mercia marries Princess Æthelflæd, daughter of King Alfred the Great. He accepts Wessex overlordship, and demotes himself to become "Lord of the Mercians".

====== Arabian Empire ======
- January 6 – Hasan ibn Zayd, founder of the Zaydid Dynasty, dies after a 20-year reign at Amul. He is succeeded by his brother Muhammad, as emir of Tabaristan.
- May 10 – Ahmad ibn Tulun, founder of the Tulunid Dynasty, dies after a 15-year reign. He is succeeded by his son Khumarawayh, as ruler of Egypt and Syria.
- Fall – The Arabs sack the abbey of Monte Cassino in two raids (September and November). The bulk of the monastic community flee to Teano (Campania).

====== Asia ======
- March 4 – Emperor Yōzei is forced to abdicate the throne by Fujiwara no Mototsune, chancellor (kampaku) of the Japanese royal court. He is succeeded by his great-uncle Kōkō.
- The Huang Chao rebellion is suppressed by forces of Emperor Xi Zong, with the help of the Shatuo Turks. Chinese warlords rule the country, instead of the imperial government.

==== By topic ====
====== Religion ======
- May 15 – Pope Marinus II dies at Rome, after a reign of less than 1½ years. He is succeeded by Adrian III (also referred to as Hadrian III), as the 109th pope of the Catholic Church.

=== 885 ===
==== By place ====
====== Europe ======
- Summer – Emperor Charles the Fat summons a meeting of officials at Lobith (modern Netherlands), and accuses Hugh, an illegitimate son of former king Lothair II, and his vassal Godfrid, Duke of Frisia, of plotting against him. Hugh is blinded, and exiled to the Abbey of Saint Gall (modern Switzerland). Godfrid is killed by a group of Frisian and Saxon nobles, at the connivance of Henry of Franconia. The local count, Gerolf, takes over the West Frisian coastline from the Danish, after the murder.
- Summer – Charles the Fat designates his illegitimate son Bernard as his heir, ignoring the claims of his nephew, Arnulf of Carinthia (illegitimate son of Carloman of Bavaria), and Charles the Simple (5-year-old son of King Louis the Stammerer). The Frankish bishops protest, so Charles summons Pope Adrian III to an assembly in Worms, to resolve the issue. Adrian leaves Rome in the hands of Bishop John of Pavia and heads to Germany, but dies on the way, just after crossing the River Po.
- November 25 – Siege of Paris: Viking forces, under the Norse chieftains Sigfred and Sinric, sail up the River Seine for eastern France, with a fleet of 300 longships (10,000 men). They appear before Paris, and offer to spare the city if they are allowed free passage, by paying them tribute (Danegeld). Their request is denied.
- November 27 – The Vikings begin the Siege of Paris by attacking the northeast tower with ballistae, mangonels and catapults. All Viking attacks are repulsed by Odo, Count of Paris, who defends the city with a small garrison (about 200 men). Sigfred decides to withdraw, and builds a camp on the right bank of the river. Meanwhile he mines the city, and scours the countryside for provisions.

====== Britain ======
- King Alfred the Great summons Asser, a relative of Bishop Nobis of St. David's, to the English court. He agrees to spend six months of the year in the king's service. Asser helps to negotiate the recognition of Alfred, as overlord of the Welsh kings.
- Danish Vikings land in Kent and besiege Rochester. Town defences having been improved, the city holds out long enough for Alfred the Great to organize an army. He forces the Vikings to flee back across the Channel, to the Continent.
- A naval force raised by Alfred the Great takes part in the two Battles of the River Stour.
- Kings Hyfaidd of Dyfed, Elisedd of Brycheiniog and Hywel of Glywysing, being harassed by the armies of King Anarawd in Wales, seek the protection of Alfred the Great, and submit to his overlordship. Anarawd seeks an alliance with King Guthred of York.

====== Arabian Empire ======
- Battle of Tawahin: Muslim forces (4,000 men) of the Abbasid Caliphate, under Al-Mu'tadid, are defeated near Ramlah (modern Israel) by Khumarawayh, ruler of the Tulunid dynasty. This ends the Abbasid attempt to recover Syria from the Tulunids. A large part of the Abbasid army is captured, and transported to Egypt. Khumarawayh aims for reconciliation with the caliphal government, and allows the soldiers who want to return to modern-day Iraq to depart without ransom, while offering the rest the opportunity to settle in Egypt.

==== By topic ====
====== Religion ======
- July 8 – Pope Adrian III dies after a 1½ reign near Modena (Lombardy), while en route to an Imperial Diet, summoned by Charles the Fat at Worms. He is succeeded by Stephen V, as the 110th pope of the Catholic Church.

=== 886 ===
==== By place ====
====== Byzantine Empire ======
- March – A wide-ranging conspiracy against Emperor Basil I, led by John Kourkouas, is uncovered.
- August 29 – Emperor Basil I the Macedonian dies from a fever, contracted after a hunting accident. He is succeeded by the 19-year-old Leo VI, a son of former emperor Michael III, as sole ruler (basileus) of the Byzantine Empire. After his coronation Leo reburies the remains of his father with great ceremony in the imperial mausoleum, within the Church of the Holy Apostles in Constantinople.

====== Europe ======
- October – Siege of Paris: Count Odo slips through Viking-controlled territory, to ask the king of West Francia Charles the Fat for support. He returns with a relief force, and reaches safety within the walls. Charles arrives later with a large army, and establishes a camp at Montmartre. After negotiations he promises the Vikings tribute (Danegeld) worth 700 Livres (equivalent to 257kg of silver), and allows them to sail up the River Seine, to over-winter in Burgundy.

====== Britain ======
- King Alfred the Great of Wessex recaptures London from the Danish Vikings, and renames it Lundenburh. Slightly upstream from London Bridge, he builds a small harbor called Queenhithe. Alfred hands the town over to his son-in-law Æthelred, lord of Mercia. A street system is planned out in the town, with boundaries of 1,100 yards from east to west, and around 330 yards from north to south.
- King Alfred receives the formal submission of all of the citizens of England not under Viking rule, and adopts the title King of the Anglo-Saxons.

==== By topic ====
====== Religion ======
- December – Emperor Leo VI dismisses Patriarch Photius I, who has been his tutor, and replaces him with his own brother Stephen I.
- The Glagolitic alphabet, devised by Cyril and Methodius, missionaries from Constantinople, is adopted in the Bulgarian Empire.
- Boris I, ruler (khan) of the Bulgarian Empire, establishes the Preslav and Ohrid Literary Schools.

=== 887 ===
==== By place ====
====== Europe ======
- November 17 – East Frankish magnates revolt against the inept emperor Charles III (the Fat) in an assembly at Frankfurt, and depose him. His nephew Arnulf of Carinthia, the illegitimate son of former king Carloman of Bavaria, is elected ruler of the East Frankish Kingdom. Charles yields his throne without a struggle, and retires to Neidingen.
- December 26 – In an assembly at Pavia (Northern Italy), the lords of Lombardia elect Berengar I, a grandson of former emperor Louis the Pious (through his daughter Gisela), as king of Italy. He is crowned with the Iron Crown of Lombardy. After the deposition of Charles the Fat, the nobility chooses Ranulf II as duke (or 'king') of Aquitaine.

====== Japan ======
- August 26 – Emperor Kōkō abdicates the throne and soon dies, after a 3-year reign. He is succeeded by his 20-year-old son Uda, as the 59th emperor of Japan.

====== Al-Andalus ======
- The city of Toledo rises against the Umayyad Dynasty, in Al-Andalus (modern Spain).

==== By topic ====
====== Religion ======
- February 5 – Theodosius Romanus ascends as Syriac Orthodox patriarch of Antioch.

=== 888 ===
==== By place ====
====== Europe ======
- January 13 – Emperor Charles III (the Fat) dies at Neidingen, after having suffered repeat bouts of an illness that may have been epilepsy. The Frankish Empire is split again, and falls apart into separate kingdoms. Count Odo, the hero of the Siege of Paris, is elected king of the West Frankish Kingdom, and crowned at Compiègne by Walter, archbishop of Sens. Other Frankish noblemen support the 8-year-old Charles the Simple (the posthumous son of the late king Louis the Stammerer).
- October – Alan I (the Great), count of Vannes, and his rival Judicael, unite their forces to defeat the Vikings at Questembert (or 889). Judicael is killed, in a notable victory for the Bretons, with 15,000 Vikings crushed, some few 400 escaping to their ships. In command of a 'united' Breton force, Alan is able to drive the Vikings back to the Loire River. Alan becomes sole ruler of Brittany, and over the Frankish counties of Rennes, Nantes, Coutances and Avranches.
- October – Battle of Milazzo: the Aghlabids score a crushing victory over a Byzantine fleet off Sicily.
- Winter – King Arnulf of Carinthia leads an East Frankish expedition into Italy, after he is recognized as overlord of France and Burgundy. Arnulf descends with an army over the Brenner Pass, and meets King Berengar I at a peace conference at Trento. Berengar grants him two counties in the Val d'Adige (Northern Italy), and does homage to Arnulf as overlord. In turn, Arnulf confirms Berengar as king of Lombardia, and returns to Germany.
- Lord Æthelred II of the Mercians is struck down with a debilitating illness. His wife, Princess Æthelflæd (a daughter of Alfred the Great) of Wessex, joins him as joint ruler of Mercia (approximate date).
- The Aghlabids issue decrees according to which Jews and Christians are to wear a patch (ruq'a) of white fabric on their shoulder of their outer garment, with the patch for Jews depicting an ape and that for the Christians depicting a pig.

====== Al-Andalus ======
- Al-Mundhir, Moorish emir of Córdoba, dies after a two-year reign (possibly murdered by his brother Abdullah ibn Muhammad al-Umawi, who succeeds him as ruler of the Emirate of Córdoba).

====== China ======
- April 20 – Emperor Xi Zong (Li Xuan) dies of illness at Chang'an, after a 14-year reign. He is succeeded by his 21-year-old brother Zhao Zong, as ruler of the Tang Dynasty.

==== By topic ====
====== Religion ======
- Shaftesbury Abbey is founded by King Alfred the Great in Dorset. He installs his daughter Æthelgifu as first abbess (approximate date).

=== 889 ===
==== By place ====
====== Europe ======
- Guy III, duke of Spoleto, defeats the Lombard king Berengar I at the Trebbia River, and is acclaimed as king of Italy at an assembly in Pavia. After confirming some privileges to the Catholic Church, he is crowned with the Iron Crown of Lombardy, by Pope Stephen V. Berengar is forced to retreat to Verona; Guy does not pursue him into Friuli, because of the (possible) wrath of King Arnulf of Carinthia.
- Boris I, ruler (khan) of the Bulgarian Empire, abdicates the throne after a 37-year reign, and retires to a monastery. He is succeeded by his eldest son Vladimir, as monarch of Bulgaria. Vladimir falls under the influence of the old boyars; many remain anti-Christian and anti-Byzantine. He attempts to restore the former Frankish alliance, and to reestablish paganism.
- Arnulf of Carinthia has his illegitimate son Zwentibold recognized, as heir of the East Frankish Kingdom. He supports the claim of Louis the Blind as king of Provence, after receiving a personal appeal from Louis's mother, Ermengard, who comes to see Arnulf at Forchheim (Northern Bavaria). Arnulf grants the town of Osnabrück trade and coinage privileges.
- A ship carrying about twenty Arab freebooters, from Pechina in Al-Andalus (modern Spain), sets anchor in the Gulf of Saint-Tropez in Provence. They establish a fortified base at Fraxinet (modern-day La Garde-Freinet). After raiding the surrounding area, the Muslim colony is bolstered by contingents of Saracen adventurers.
- The Magyars, an Ugric tribe from the steppe of Central Asia, move west under the leadership of Árpád. They are pushed by their rivals, the Pechenegs, into the Balkan Peninsula, and become entangled in a war between Bulgaria and the Byzantine Empire. The Magyars head north and settle in Great Moravia.
- In Italy, Forlì becomes a republic for the first time. The city is allied with the Ghibelline faction, in the medieval struggles between the Guelphs and Ghibellines.
- In Portugal, the count of Coimbra, Hermenegildo Gutiérrez, reconquers Coimbra, which was temporarily lost after the first conquest of 878.

====== Britain ======
- Kings Eochaid and Giric of Alba and Strathclyde (modern Scotland) are deposed by Viking invaders. They are succeeded by Donald II, the son of the late Constantine I, who becomes king of Scotland.
- Lord Æthelred II and Lady Æthelflæd (a daughter of king Alfred the Great) of the Mercians begin their policy of fortifying Mercian cities as defensive burghs, starting with Worcester (approximate date).

====== Asia ======
- The Unified Silla kingdom (modern Korea) under King Jinseong seeks to collect taxes by force from peasants, setting off massive peasant rebellions (approximate date).
- Indravarman I, ruler of the Khmer Empire (modern Cambodia), dies and is succeeded by his son Yasovarman I, called the Leper King (or 890).
- April – The Japanese era Ninna ends and Kanpyō begins, lasting until 898.

==== By topic ====
====== Religion ======
- Bongwon Temple, located in Seoul (modern South Korea), is founded by the Korean Buddhist master Doseon.

== Significant people ==
- Al-Mu'tamid
- Al-Muwaffaq
- Charles the Fat
- Alfred the Great
- Al-Mufawwid
- Abdallah ibn al-Mu'tazz
- Basil I

== Births ==
880

- Æthelweard, son of Alfred the Great (approximate date)
- Abu Bakr ibn Yahya al-Suli, Muslim poet and scholar (d. 946)
- Béatrice of Vermandois, Frankish queen (approximate date)
- Bernard the Dane, Viking nobleman (earl) (approximate date)
- Fujiwara no Tadahira, Japanese statesman and regent (d. 949)
- Gagik I of Vaspurakan, Armenian king (approximate date)
- Hugh of Arles, king of Italy and Lower Burgundy (or 881)
- Hywel ap Cadell, king of Deheubarth (Wales) (approximate date)
- Lambert II, co-ruler and king of Italy (approximate date)
- Louis the Blind, Frankish king and Holy Roman Emperor (d. 928)
- Rudolph II, Burgundian king and Holy Roman Emperor (d. 937)
- Sinan ibn Thabit, Muslim physician (d. 943)

881

- Conrad I, king of the East Frankish Kingdom (approximate date)
- Hugh of Arles, king of Italy and Lower Burgundy (or 880)
- Liu Churang, Chinese general (d. 943)

882

- February 8 – Muhammad ibn Tughj al-Ikhshid, founder of the Ikhshidid Dynasty (d. 946)
- Abu 'l-Asakir Jaysh ibn Khumarawayh, Muslim emir (approximate date)
- Cao Zhongda, official and chancellor of Wuyue (d. 943)
- Feng Dao, Chinese prince and chancellor (d. 954)
- Han Yanhui, Chinese Khitan chancellor (d. 959)
- Saadia Gaon, Jewish philosopher and exegete (or 892)
- Xia Luqi, general of the Later Tang Dynasty (d. 930)

883

- Burchard II, duke of Swabia (or 884)
- Ibn Masarra, Muslim ascetic and scholar (d. 931)
- Zhao Jiliang, chancellor of Later Shu (d. 946)
- Zhao Tingyin, Chinese general (d. 949)

884

- Burchard II, duke of Swabia (or 883)
- Kong Xun, Chinese general and governor (d. 931)
- Zhang Yanhan, Chinese official and chancellor (d. 941)

885

- Hyogong, king of Silla (Korea) (d. 912)
- February 6 – Daigo, emperor of Japan (d. 930)
- February 11 – Li Congke, emperor of Later Tang (d. 937)
- December 2 – Zhuang Zong, emperor of Later Tang (d. 926)
- Atto of Vercelli, Lombard bishop (d. 961)
- Eberhard III, duke of Franconia (d. 939)
- Eric Bloodaxe, Norwegian Viking ruler (d. 954)
- Fujiwara no Onshi, empress of Japan (d. 954)
- Gao Xingzhou, Chinese general (d. 952)
- Ibn Muqla, Muslim official and vizier (or 886)
- Reccared, Galician clergyman (d. 923)
- Zhao Ying, Chinese chancellor (d. 951)

886

- Ibn Muqlah, Muslim official and vizier (or 885)
- Ōnakatomi no Yorimoto, Japanese poet (approximate date)
- Yang Wo, emperor of Wu (Ten Kingdoms) (d. 908)

887

- Frederuna, queen of the West Frankish Kingdom (d. 917)
- Qian Yuanguan, king of Wuyue (Ten Kingdoms) (d. 941)
- Song Qiqiu, chief strategist of Southern Tang (d. 959)

888

- October 20 – Zhu Youzhen, emperor of Later Liang (d. 923)
- Liu Xu, chancellor of Later Tang and Later Jin (d. 947)
- Vratislaus I, duke of Bohemia (approximate date)
- Zhu Yougui, emperor of Later Liang (approximate date)

889

- January 7 – Li Bian, emperor of Southern Tang (d. 943)
- January 11 – Abd al-Rahman III, Muslim caliph (or 891)
- Liu Yan, emperor of Southern Han (d. 942)
- Minamoto no Kintada, Japanese waka poet (d. 948)

== Deaths ==
880

- February 2 – Bruno, duke of Saxony
- March 22 – Carloman of Bavaria, Frankish king
- Ansgarde of Burgundy, Frankish queen (or 882)
- Ariwara no Narihira, Japanese waka poet (b. 825)
- Guaifer of Salerno, Lombard prince
- Hugh of Saxony, illegitimate son of Louis the Younger
- Fatima al-Fihri, Arab university founder
- Lambert I, duke of Spoleto (approximate date)
- Lothar I, Frankish nobleman (b. 840)
- Sugawara no Koreyoshi, Japanese nobleman (b. 812)

881

- December 7 – Anspert, archbishop of Milan
- Bárid mac Ímair, king of Dublin
- Cui Hang, chancellor of the Tang Dynasty
- David I, prince of Iberia (Georgia)
- Gabriel, prince of Kakheti (Georgia)
- Guaifer, duke of Benevento
- John I, Frankish abbot (approximate date)
- Liu Ye, chancellor of the Tang Dynasty
- Lu Guimeng, Chinese poet
- Odo I, bishop of Beauvais
- Orso I, doge of Venice
- Radi Abdullah, Muslim tenth Imam
- Zhang Zhifang, Chinese general

882

- January 20 – Louis the Younger, king of the East Frankish Kingdom
- August 5 – Louis III, king of the West Frankish Kingdom
- December 16 – John VIII, pope of the Catholic Church
- December 21 – Hincmar, archbishop of Reims (b. 806)
- Ainbíth mac Áedo, Dál Fiatach king of Ulaid (Ireland)
- Al-Hasan ibn Makhlad al-Jarrah, Muslim vizier
- Ansgarde of Burgundy, Frankish queen (or 880)
- Chen Tao, Chinese poet (b. 824)
- Eric Anundsson, Swedish king (approximate date)
- Eudokia Ingerina, Byzantine empress (approximate date)
- Duan Yanmo, Chinese warlord (approximate date)
- García Íñiguez I, king of Pamplona (approximate date)
- Guaram Mampali, Georgian Bagratid prince
- Lambert III, Frankish nobleman (b. 830)

883

- September 11 – Kesta Styppiotes, Byzantine general
- Ansegisus, archbishop of Sens (or 879)
- Anselm of Farfa, Frankish abbot (approximate date)
- Bertharius, Benedictine abbot and poet
- Bertulf, archbishop of Trier
- Dawud al-Zahiri, Muslim scholar (or 884)
- Eochocán mac Áedo, king of Ulaid (Ireland)
- Froila, Galician bishop
- Guy II, duke of Spoleto
- Han Jian, Chinese warlord
- Ignatius II, patriarch of Antioch
- Pi Rixiu, Chinese poet
- Wang Jingchong, Chinese governor (b. 847)
- Yang Fuguang, Chinese general (b. 842)

884

- January 6 – Hasan ibn Zayd, Muslim emir of Tabaristan
- May 10 – Ahmad ibn Tulun, Governor of Egypt and founder of the Tulunid dynasty (b. 835)
- May 15 – Marinus I, pope of the Catholic Church
- June 11 – Shi Jingsi, general of the Tang Dynasty
- June 29 – Yang Shili, general of the Tang Dynasty
- July 13 – Huang Chao, Chinese rebel leader (b. 835)
- September – Buran bint al-Hasan ibn Sahl, Abbasid consort (b. 807)
- October 12 – Tsunesada, Japanese prince (b. 825)
- December 12 – Carloman II, king of the West Frankish Kingdom
- Al-Abbas ibn Ahmad ibn Tulun, Tulunid prince and usurper
- Colcu mac Connacan, Irish abbot and historian
- Dawud al-Zahiri, Muslim scholar (or 883)
- Empress Cao (Huang Chao's wife)
- Domnall mac Muirecáin, king of Leinster
- Li Changyan, Chinese warlord and governor
- Shang Rang, Chinese rebel leader (approximate date)
- Wang Duo, chancellor of the Tang Dynasty
- Zhou Ji, Chinese warlord (approximate date)

885

- April 6 – Methodius, Byzantine missionary and bishop (b. 815)
- June – Godfrid, Duke of Frisia, 'the Sea King', murdered
- July 8 – Adrian III, pope of the Catholic Church
- July 25 – Ragenold, margrave of Neustria, killed
- July/August – Sulayman ibn Wahb, Muslim official and vizier
- November 17 – Liutgard of Saxony, Frankish queen
- Chen Ru, Chinese warlord and governor, killed
- Gerebald, bishop of Chalon-sur-Saône
- Mihira Bhoja, king of the Gurjara-Pratihara dynasty (b. 836)
- Muiredach mac Brain, king of Leinster (Ireland)
- Zhu Jingmei, Chinese eunuch and military leader, assassinated

886

- March 9 – Abu Ma'shar al-Balkhi, Muslim scholar and astrologer (b. 787)
- August 29 – Basil I, emperor of the Byzantine Empire (b. 811)
- Adalbert I, Frankish margrave (approximate date)
- Airemón mac Áedo, king of Ulaid (Ireland)
- Bernard Plantapilosa, Frankish nobleman (b. 841)
- Deorlaf, bishop of Hereford (approximate date)
- Fiachnae mac Ainbítha, king of Ulaid
- Gao Renhou, Chinese general
- Henry of Franconia, Frankish general
- Heongang, king of Silla (Korea)
- Hugh, archbishop of Cologne
- Joscelin, bishop of Paris
- Li Quanzhong, Chinese warlord
- Li Sigong, Chinese warlord (approximate date)
- Lu Yanhong, Chinese warlord
- Min Xu, governor of the Tang Dynasty
- Muhammad I, Muslim emir of Córdoba (b. 823)
- Robert I, Frankish nobleman
- Wang Xu, Chinese warlord
- Wulgrin I, Frankish nobleman
- Zhuge Shuang, Chinese general

887

- January 11 – Boso of Provence, Frankish nobleman
- April 6 – Pei Che, chancellor of the Tang Dynasty
- July 6 – Wang Chongrong, Chinese warlord
- August 26 – Kōkō, emperor of Japan (b. 830)
- September 18 – Pietro I Candiano, doge of Venice
- September 24 – Gao Pian, general of the Tang Dynasty
- Abbas ibn Firnas, Muslim physician and inventor (b. 810)
- Ibn Majah, Muslim hadith compiler (or 889)
- Jeonggang, king of Silla (modern Korea)
- Xiao Gou, chancellor of the Tang Dynasty
- Yantou Quanhuo, Chinese Chan master (b. 828)
- Zheng Changtu, chancellor of the Tang Dynasty
- Zhu Mei, Chinese warlord (approximate date)
- Sigurd Ragnarsson, King of Denmark

888

- January 13 – Charles the Fat, Frankish emperor (b. 839)
- April 20 – Xi Zong, emperor of the Tang Dynasty (b. 862)
- June 11 – Rimbert, archbishop of Bremen (b. 830)
- June 30 – Æthelred, archbishop of Canterbury
- Áed mac Conchobair, king of Connacht (Ireland)
- Æthelswith, Anglo-Saxon queen
- Al-Mundhir, Muslim emir of Córdoba
- Cerball mac Dúnlainge, king of Osraige (Ireland)
- Ingelger, founder of the House of Anjou
- Judicael, duke of Brittany (or 889)
- Le Yanzhen, Chinese warlord
- Nasra of Tao-Klarjeti, Georgian prince
- Sichfrith mac Ímair, king of Dublin
- Tetbert, Frankish nobleman
- Zhang Gui, Chinese warlord
- Zhou Bao, Chinese general (b. 814)

889

- June 9 – Aimoin, Frankish monk and archivist
- December 23 – Solomon II, bishop of Constance
- Bořivoj I, duke of Bohemia (approximate date)
- Ibn Marwan, Muslim Sufi leader (approximate date)
- Ibn Qutaybah, Muslim scholar (b. 828)
- Indravarman I, king of the Khmer Empire (or 890)
- Judicael, duke of Brittany (or 888)
- Liutbert, archbishop of Mainz
- Meng Fangli, Chinese warlord
- Qin Zongquan, Chinese warlord
- Sa'id ibn Makhlad, Muslim vizier
- Wang Jingwu, Chinese warlord
- Wilbert, archbishop of Cologne
- Zhao Chou, Chinese warlord (b. 824)
- Zhao Huang, Chinese warlord
