= 880 =

Calendar year

880 in various calendars
- Gregorian calendar: 880; DCCCLXXX
- Ab urbe condita: 1633
- Armenian calendar: 329; ԹՎ ՅԻԹ
- Assyrian calendar: 5630
- Balinese saka calendar: 801–802
- Bengali calendar: 286–287
- Berber calendar: 1830
- Buddhist calendar: 1424
- Burmese calendar: 242
- Byzantine calendar: 6388–6389
- Chinese calendar: 己亥年 (Earth Pig); 3577 or 3370 — to — 庚子年 (Metal Rat); 3578 or 3371
- Coptic calendar: 596–597
- Discordian calendar: 2046
- Ethiopian calendar: 872–873
- Hebrew calendar: 4640–4641
- Hindu calendars
- Vikram Samvat: 936–937
- Shaka Samvat: 801–802
- Kali Yuga: 3980–3981
- Holocene calendar: 10880
- Iranian calendar: 258–259
- Islamic calendar: 266–267
- Japanese calendar: Gangyō 4 (元慶４年)
- Javanese calendar: 778–779
- Julian calendar: 880; DCCCLXXX
- Korean calendar: 3213
- Minguo calendar: 1032 before ROC 民前1032年
- Nanakshahi calendar: −588
- Seleucid era: 1191/1192 AG
- Thai solar calendar: 1422–1423
- Tibetan calendar: ས་མོ་ཕག་ལོ་ (female Earth-Boar); 1006 or 625 or −147 — to — ལྕགས་ཕོ་བྱི་བ་ལོ་ (male Iron-Rat); 1007 or 626 or −146

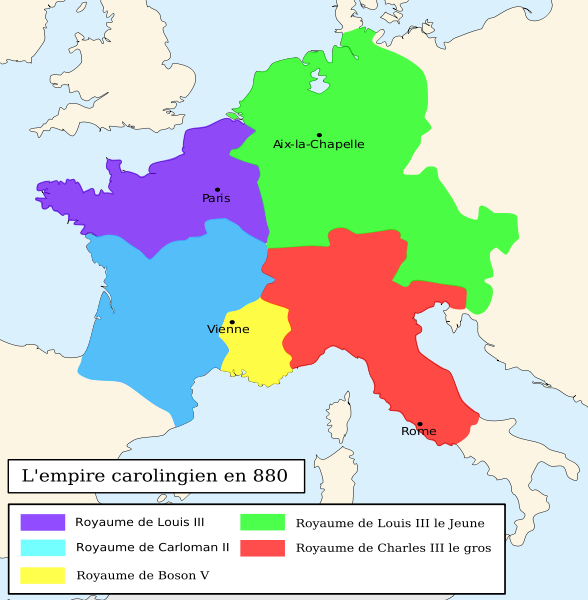
Frankish Empire: the realm ruled by King Louis III (purple) after the division in 880.

Year 880 (DCCCLXXX) was a leap year starting on Friday of the Julian calendar.

== Events ==
=== By place ===
==== Byzantine Empire ====
- Battle of Cephalonia: A Byzantine fleet, under Admiral Nasar, is sent by Emperor Basil I to the Ionian Islands. Nasar defeats the Aghlabids in a night battle near Cephalonia (modern Greece).
- May 1 – The Nea Ekklesia is inaugurated in Constantinople, by Patriarch Photius I, setting the model for all later cross-in-square Orthodox churches.

==== Europe ====
- February 2 – Battle of Lüneburg Heath: King Louis III is defeated by the Norse Great Heathen Army at Lüneburg Heath. The Saxons are routed in a snowstorm; many drown in the river or are captured during the retreat.
- Battle of Thimeon: King Louis III ("the Younger") defeats Vikings (probably Norsemen) from England, near Charleroi, north of the River Sambre. During the battle 5,000 Vikings are killed.
- Battle of Fjaler: King Harald Fairhair moves east along the Norwegian coast with his fleet. He defeats his rival Atle Mjove at Fjaler in Sunnfjord, and lands with his longships at Tønsberg.
- December – Treaty of Ribemont: Louis the Younger and the kings of the West Frankish Kingdom sign a treaty. The young Frankish monarch, Louis III, is reduced to merely Neustria.
- Lambert I, duke of Spoleto, dies while besieging the city of Capua. He is succeeded by his son Guy II.
- The oldest known mention is made of the city of Dortmund (approximate date).

==== Asia ====
- Fujiwara no Mototsune, Japanese statesman, creates the position of regent (kampaku) for himself. The Fujiwara clan will be able to dominate the government for more than 3 centuries.
- December 22 – Luoyang, eastern Chinese capital of the Tang dynasty, is captured by rebel leader Huang Chao, during the reign of emperor Xizong.

=== By topic ===
==== Religion ====
- Pope John VIII issues the bull Industriae Tuae, creating an independent ecclesiastical province in Great Moravia, with archbishop Methodius as its head. Old Church Slavonic is recognized as the fourth liturgical language, besides Latin, Greek and Hebrew.
- The first known Christian bishopric in Slovakia is established in the city of Nitra, with Wiching as bishop.

== Births ==
- Æthelweard, son of Alfred the Great (approximate date)
- Abu Bakr ibn Yahya al-Suli, Muslim poet and scholar (d. 946)
- Béatrice of Vermandois, Frankish queen (approximate date)
- Bernard the Dane, Viking nobleman (earl) (approximate date)
- Fujiwara no Tadahira, Japanese statesman and regent (d. 949)
- Gagik I of Vaspurakan, Armenian king (approximate date)
- Hugh of Arles, king of Italy and Lower Burgundy (or 881)
- Hywel ap Cadell, king of Deheubarth (Wales) (approximate date)
- Lambert II, co-ruler and king of Italy (approximate date)
- Louis the Blind, Frankish king and Holy Roman Emperor (d. 928)
- Rudolph II, Burgundian king and Holy Roman Emperor (d. 937)
- Sinan ibn Thabit, Muslim physician (d. 943)

== Deaths ==
- February 2 – Bruno, duke of Saxony
- March 22 – Carloman of Bavaria, Frankish king
- Ansgarde of Burgundy, Frankish queen (or 882)
- Ariwara no Narihira, Japanese waka poet (b. 825)
- Guaifer of Salerno, Lombard prince
- Hugh of Saxony, illegitimate son of Louis the Younger
- Fatima al-Fihri, Arab university founder
- Lambert I, duke of Spoleto (approximate date)
- Lothar I, Frankish nobleman (b. 840)
- Sugawara no Koreyoshi, Japanese nobleman (b. 812)
