= Louis III of Germany =

Louis III of Germany may refer to:

- Louis the Younger, son of Louis II of Germany
- Louis the Child, grandnephew of the previous. He would rather have been Louis IV of Germany
