= Ochancourt =

- Commune
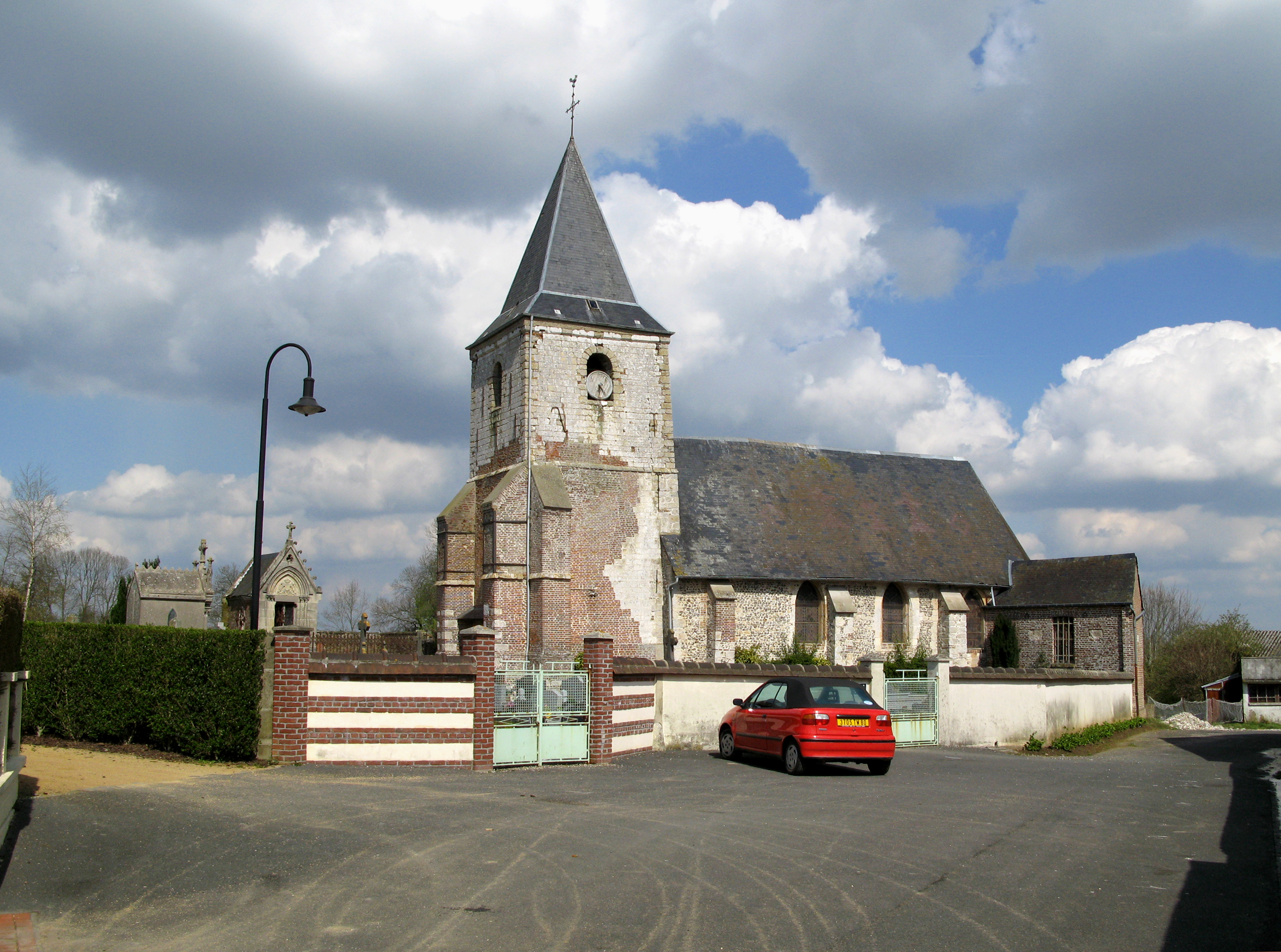
- Cemetery and church
- Location of Ochancourt
- Location within France Location within Hauts-de-France
- Coordinates: 50°06′15″N 1°36′57″E
- Country: France
- Region: Hauts-de-France
- Department: Somme
- Arrondissement: Abbeville
- Canton: Friville-Escarbotin
- Intercommunality: CC Vimeu

Government
  - Mayor (2020–2026): Flavien Grenon
- Area^{1}: 3.95 km^{2} (1.53 sq mi)
- Elevation: 71 m (233 ft)
- Highest elevation: 79 m (259 ft)
- Lowest elevation: 45 m (148 ft)
- Population (2023): 322
  - Density: 81.5/km^{2} (211/sq mi)
- Time zone: UTC+01:00 (CET)
  - Summer (DST): UTC+02:00 (CEST)
- INSEE/Postal code: 80603 /80210
- ^{1} French Land Register data, which excludes lakes, ponds, glaciers > 1 km^{2} (0.386 sq mi or 247 acres) and river estuaries.

Ochancourt (French pronunciation: [ɔʃɑ̃kuʁ]) is a commune in the Somme department in Hauts-de-France in northern France.

== Geography ==
Ochancourt is situated on the D48 road, some 10 miles (16 km) west of Abbeville.

== Population ==
Historical population
| Year | Pop. | ±% p.a. |
|---|---|---|
| 1968 | 213 | — |
| 1975 | 189 | −1.69% |
| 1982 | 241 | +3.53% |
| 1990 | 253 | +0.61% |
| 1999 | 235 | −0.82% |
| 2007 | 254 | +0.98% |
| 2012 | 288 | +2.54% |
| 2017 | 317 | +1.94% |
| 2023 | 322 | +0.26% |
Source: INSEE

== History ==
Within the commune, on the ‘land of graves’, are said to rest the remains of those that died (9000+ ) at the Battle of Saucourt-en-Vimeu, where Louis III of France fought and defeated the Normans in 881. Other historians claim it is the site of the battle itself.

== Places of interest ==
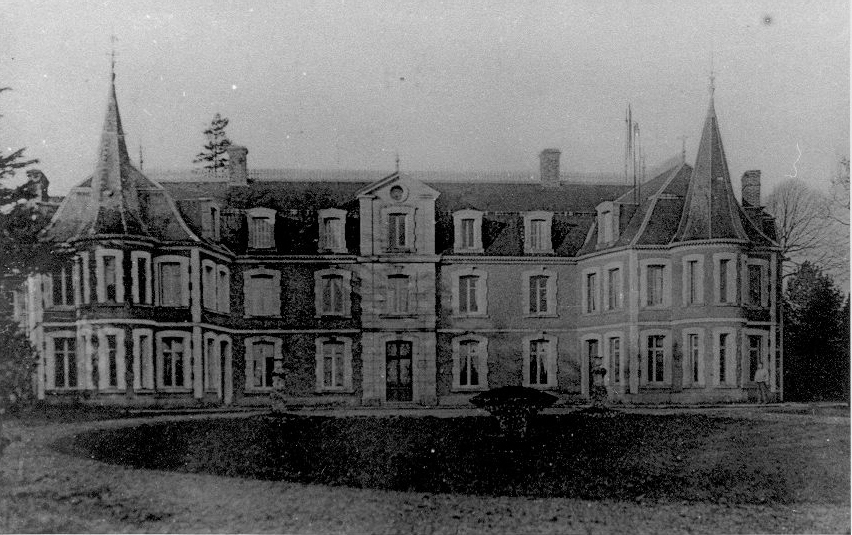
Castle, on a postcard.

- The church, with parts dating from the twelfth century
- The family chapels in the cemetery and at the crossroads

== See also ==
- Communes of the Somme department
