= Gundachar, Margrave of Carinthia =

Gundachar (died 869) was the Count (or margrave) of Carinthia from around 858 and prefect from 863. He was a Bavarian.

Around 858, the counts (or dukes, duces) Rihher of Pannonia and Pabo of Carinthia conspired against their overlord, the prefect Carloman. Carloman replaced them with Udalrich of Pannonia and Gundachar respectively. This display of independence on Carloman's part startled his father, King Louis the German, into purging a party of noblemen who were close to Carloman (861) and granting extensive holdings in Pannonia and Carinthia to the Archdiocese of Salzburg (860).

In 863, Louis marched an army towards Pannonia on the pretense of subduing Rastislav of Moravia, but intended to subdue Carloman, who had entrusted most of his forces to Gundachar to guard the river Schwarza. Louis had secretly negotiated with Gundachar, however, and the latter went over with the army to the king's side in return for the appointment to Carinthia with the title of prefect.

In 866, Gundachar, again a vassal of Carloman, was involved in the insurrection of Louis the Younger and rebelled against Louis the German, but was defeated and nearly killed. He is said to have taken part in other revolts and perjuries (oath breakings). In 869, he went over to Rastislav and was given a position of authority. While preparing to attack Carloman, he reportedly told his Moravian men that he Saint Emmeram of Regensburg, on whose relics he had sworn fealty to Louis, was holding his weapons down and preventing him from raising his arms and contributing to the fight. He was killed in battle and Louis ordered celebrations to be made for his death. The annalist of Fulda compared him to Catiline.

== Sources ==
- The Annals of Fulda. (Manchester Medieval series, Ninth-Century Histories, Volume II.) Reuter, Timothy (trans.) Manchester: Manchester University Press, 1992.
