= Battle of Saucourt-en-Vimeu =

881 battle during the Viking invasions of West Francia

Coordinates: 50.1042°N 1.6158°E

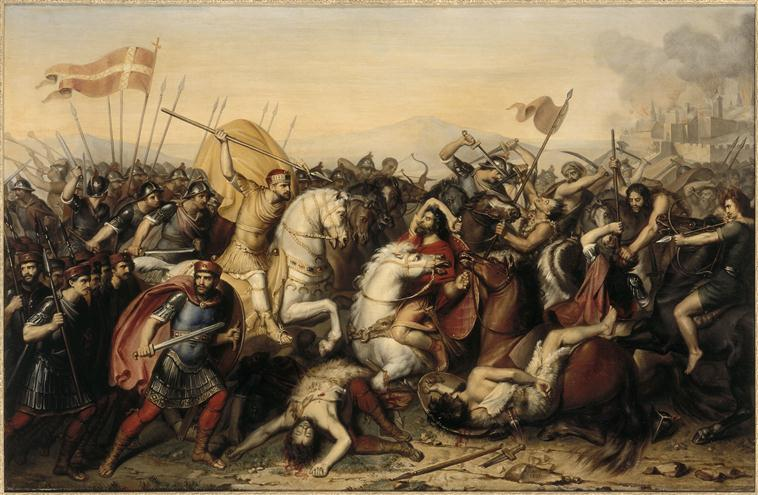
Battle of Saucourt-en-Vimeu, as depicted by Jean-Joseph Dassy

The Battle of Saucourt was part of the Viking invasions of West Francia and occurred between forces of Vikings and the troops of Kings of West Francia, Louis III of France and his brother Carloman II, on 3 August 881 at Saucourt-en-Vimeu.

== Background ==
Following the Battle of Thimeon near Charleroi where the Vikings were defeated by Louis the Younger, King of East Francia, they resumed their raids on the West Frankish kingdom. After taking Kortrijk in November 880, they raided Arras and Cambrai in December. Later in 881, they sacked Amiens and Corbie.

== Battle ==
Louis and Carloman were victorious, in what must have been a rare pitched battle, against the northern raiders in which some 9,000 Vikings were slain according to the Annals of Fulda. The battle is celebrated in the Old High German poem Ludwigslied.

Despite winning the battle, Louis was unable to take advantage of this victory since he would die in an accident in 882. The battle of Saucourt did nothing to stop Viking raids, who switched to raiding Lotharingia.

== See also ==
- Carolingian Empire

== Sources ==
- Augustana (1992). "bibliotheca Augustana". Hs-augsburg.de.
- Costambeys, Marios; Innes, Matthew; MacLean, Simon (2011). The Carolingian World. Cambridge University Press. ISBN 9781139936149.
- Gillmor, C.M. (2010). "Saucourt, Battle of". In Rogers, Clifford J. (ed.). The Oxford Encyclopedia of Medieval Warfare and Military Technology. Oxford University Press. pp. 223–224.
- McKitterick, Rosamond (1999). The Frankish Kingdoms under the Carolingians. Pearson Education Limited.
- Verhulst, Adriaan (1999). The Rise of Cities in North-West Europe. Cambridge University Press.
