= Charles the Fat =

Carolingian emperor from 881 to 887

- Emperor of the Romans
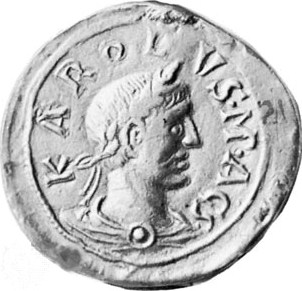
- A seal of Charles the Fat with the inscription KAROLVS MAGS (Carolus Magnus)

Emperor of the Carolingian Empire
- Reign: 12 February 881 – November 887
- Coronation: 12 February 881, Rome
- Predecessor: Charles the Bald (877)
- Successor: Guy of Spoleto (as Emperor in Italy), (891)

King of West Francia and Aquitaine
- Reign: 12 December 884 – November 887
- Coronation: 20 May 885, Grand
- Predecessor: Carloman II
- Successor: Odo of France; Ranulf II of Aquitaine

King of East Francia
- Reign: January 882 - November 887
- Predecessor: Vacant (unity restored)
- Successor: Arnulf of Carinthia

King of Italy
- Reign: 22 March 880 – November 887
- Coronation: 12 April 880, Ravenna
- Predecessor: Carloman
- Successor: Berengar I

King of Alamannia
- Reign: 28 August 876 – January 882
- Predecessor: None, title created 876 (or 865)
- Successor: None, East Francia unified under one king in 882, Duchy of Swabia created in 912
- Co-rulers: Carloman (876–880); Louis the Younger (876–882)
- Born: 839; Neudingen (Donaueschingen), Carolingian Empire
- Died: 13 January 888 (aged 48–49); Neudingen (Donaueschingen), Carolingian Empire
- Burial: Abbey of Reichenau, Lake Constance (present-day Germany)
- Spouse: Richardis of Swabia (m. 862)
- Issue: Bernard (illegitimate)
- Dynasty: Carolingian
- Father: Louis the German
- Mother: Hemma
- Religion: Chalcedonian Christianity

Charles the Fat (839 – 13 January 888) was the emperor of the Carolingian Empire (Note: This is the term preferred by scholars for the early phase of what became the Holy Roman Empire of the high Middle Ages and the early modern period. He is numbered as "Charles III" in the lists on German monarchs but, despite briefly ruling over West Francia, is not counted as king of France, a precedent set when Charles V adopted his regnal number.) from 881 to 887. A member of the Carolingian dynasty, Charles was the youngest son of Louis the German and Hemma, and a great-grandson of Charlemagne. He was the last Carolingian emperor of legitimate birth and the last to rule a united kingdom of the Franks.

Over his lifetime, Charles became ruler of the various kingdoms of Charlemagne's former empire. Granted lordship over Alamannia in 876, following the division of East Francia, he succeeded to the Italian throne upon the abdication of his older brother Carloman of Bavaria who had been incapacitated by a stroke. Crowned emperor in 881 by Pope John VIII, his succession to the territories of his brother Louis the Younger (Saxony and Bavaria) the following year reunited the kingdom of East Francia. Upon the death of his cousin Carloman II in 884, he inherited all of West Francia, thus reuniting the entire Carolingian Empire.

Usually considered lethargic and inept—he was frequently ill, and is believed to have had epilepsy—Charles twice purchased peace with Viking raiders, including at the infamous Siege of Paris, which led to his downfall.

The reunited empire did not last. During a coup led by his nephew Arnulf of Carinthia in mid-November 887, Charles was deposed in East Francia, Lotharingia, and the Kingdom of Italy. Forced into quiet retirement, he died of natural causes on 13 January 888, just a few weeks after his deposition. The Empire quickly fell apart after his death, splintering into five separate successor kingdoms; the territory it had occupied was not entirely reunited under one ruler until the conquests of Napoleon.

== Nickname and number ==
The nickname "Charles the Fat" (Latin Carolus Crassus) is not contemporary. It was first used by the Annalista Saxo (the anonymous "Saxon Annalist") in the twelfth century. There is no contemporary reference to Charles's physical size, but the nickname has stuck and is the common name in most modern European languages (French Charles le Gros, German Karl der Dicke, Italian Carlo il Grosso).

His numeral is roughly contemporary. Regino of Prüm, a contemporary of Charles, recording his death, calls him "Emperor Charles, third of that name and dignity" (Latin Carolus imperator, tertius huius nominis et dignitatis).

== Biography ==
=== Youth and inheritance ===
Charles was the youngest of the three sons of Louis the German, first King of East Francia, and Hemma from the House of Welf. An incident of demonic possession is recorded in his youth, in which he was said to have been foaming at the mouth before he was taken to the altar of the church. This greatly affected him and his father. He was described as: "… a very Christian prince, fearing God, with all his heart keeping His commandments, very devoutly obeying the orders of the Church, generous in alms-giving, practising unceasingly prayer and song, always intent upon celebrating the praises of God."

In 859, Charles was made Count of the Breisgau, an Alemannic march bordering southern Lotharingia. In 863, his rebellious eldest brother Carloman revolted against their father. The next year Louis the Younger followed Carloman in revolt and Charles joined him. Carloman received rule over the Duchy of Bavaria. In 865, the elder Louis was forced to divide his remaining lands among his heirs: the Duchy of Saxony (along with the Duchy of Franconia and the Duchy of Thuringia) went to Louis, Alemannia (the Duchy of Swabia along with Rhaetia) went to Charles, and Lotharingia was to be divided between the younger two.

When, in 875, the Emperor Louis II, who was also King of Italy, died having agreed with Louis the German that Carloman would succeed him in Italy, Charles the Bald of West Francia invaded the peninsula and had himself crowned king and emperor. Louis the German sent first Charles and then Carloman himself, with armies containing Italian forces under Berengar of Friuli, their cousin, to the Italian kingdom. These wars, however, were not successful until the death of Charles the Bald in 877.

In 876, Louis the German died and the inheritance was divided as planned after a conference at Ries, though Charles received less of his share of Lotharingia than planned. In his charters, Charles's reign in Germania is dated from his inheritance in 876.

=== Acquisition of Italy ===
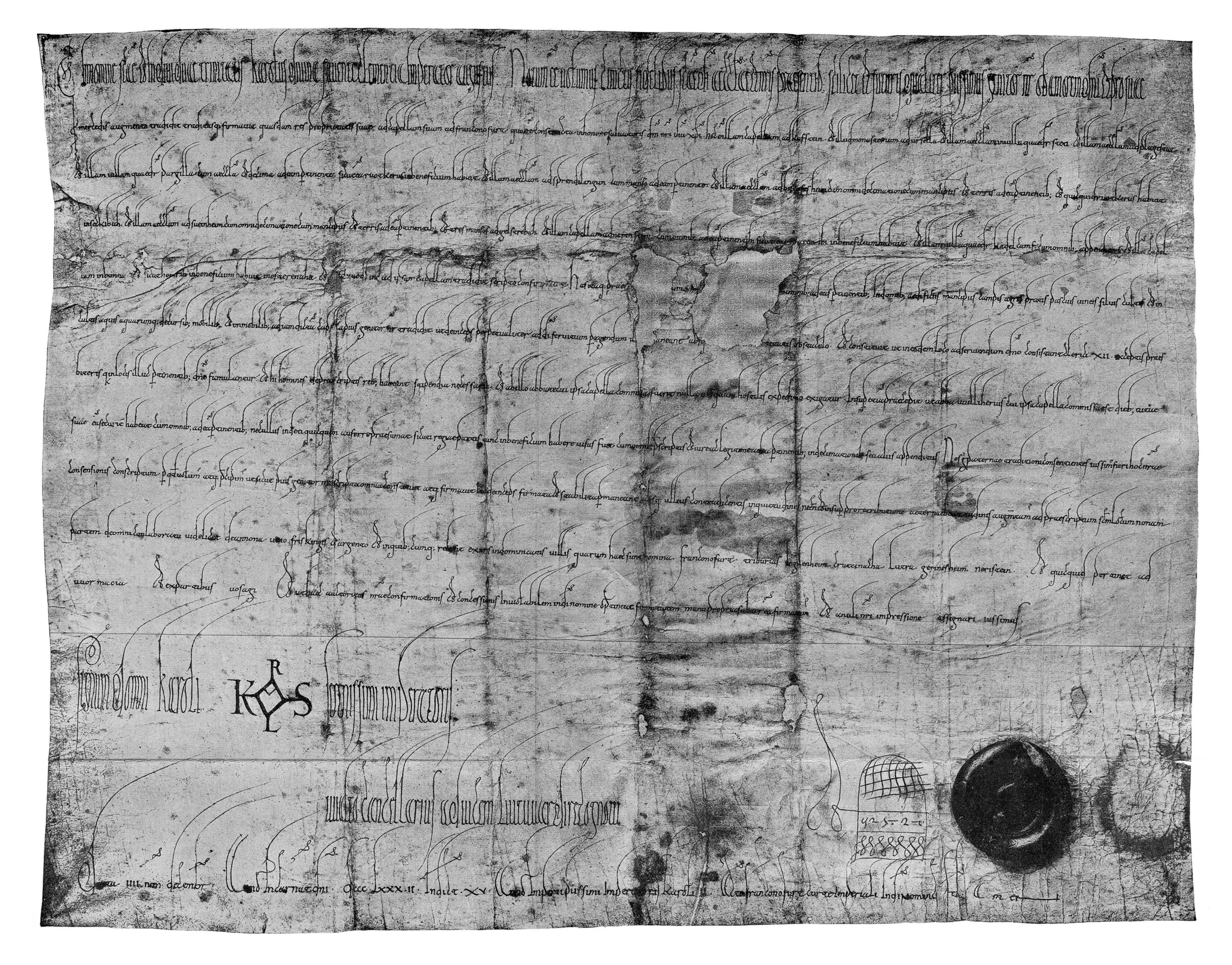
Charter of Charles III, 2 December 882

Three brothers ruled in cooperation and avoided wars over the division of their patrimony: a rare occurrence in the Early Middle Ages. In 877, Carloman finally inherited Italy from his uncle Charles the Bald. Louis divided Lotharingia and offered a third to Carloman and a third to Charles. In 878, Carloman returned his Lotharingian share to Louis, who then divided it evenly with Charles. In 879, Carloman was incapacitated by a stroke and divided his domains between his brothers: Bavaria went to Louis and Italy to Charles. Charles dated his reign in Italia from this point, and from then, he spent most of his reign until 886 in his Italian kingdom.

In 880, Charles joined Louis III of France and Carloman II, the joint kings of West Francia, in a failed siege of Boso of Provence in Vienne from August to September. Provence, legally a part of the Italian kingdom from 863, had rebelled under Boso. In August 882, Charles sent Richard, Duke of Burgundy, Count of Autun, to take the city, which he finally did in September. After this, Boso was restricted to the vicinity of Vienne.

=== Imperial coronation ===
The Empire under Charles in 887

On 18 July 880, Pope John VIII sent a letter to Guy II of Spoleto seeking peace, but the duke ignored him and invaded the Papal States. John responded by begging the aid of Charles in his capacity as king of Italy and crowned Charles emperor on 12 February 881. This was accompanied by hopes of a general revival in western Europe, but Charles proved to be unequal to the task. Charles did little to help against Guy II. Papal letters as late as November were still petitioning Charles for action.

As emperor, Charles began the construction of a palace at Sélestat in Alsace. He modelled it after the Palace at Aachen which was built by Charlemagne, whom he consciously sought to emulate, as indicated by the Gesta Karoli Magni of Notker the Stammerer. As Aachen was located in the kingdom of his brother, it was necessary for Charles to build a new palace for his court in his own power base of western Alemannia. Sélestat was also more centrally located than Aachen.

In February 882, Charles convoked a diet in Ravenna. The duke, emperor, and pope made peace and Guy and his uncle, Guy of Camerino, vowed to return the papal lands. In a March letter to Charles, John claimed that the vows went unfulfilled. In 883, Guy of Camerino, now duke of Spoleto as Guy III, was accused of treason at an imperial synod held at Nonantula late in May. He returned to Spoleto and made an alliance with the Saracens. Charles sent Berengar against Guy III. Berengar was initially successful until an epidemic of disease, which ravaged all of Italy, affecting the emperor and his entourage as well as Berengar's army, forced him to retreat.

In 883, Charles signed a treaty with Giovanni II Participazio, Doge of Venice, granting that any assassin of a doge who fled to the territory of the Empire would be fined 100 lbs of gold and banished.

=== Rule in East Francia ===
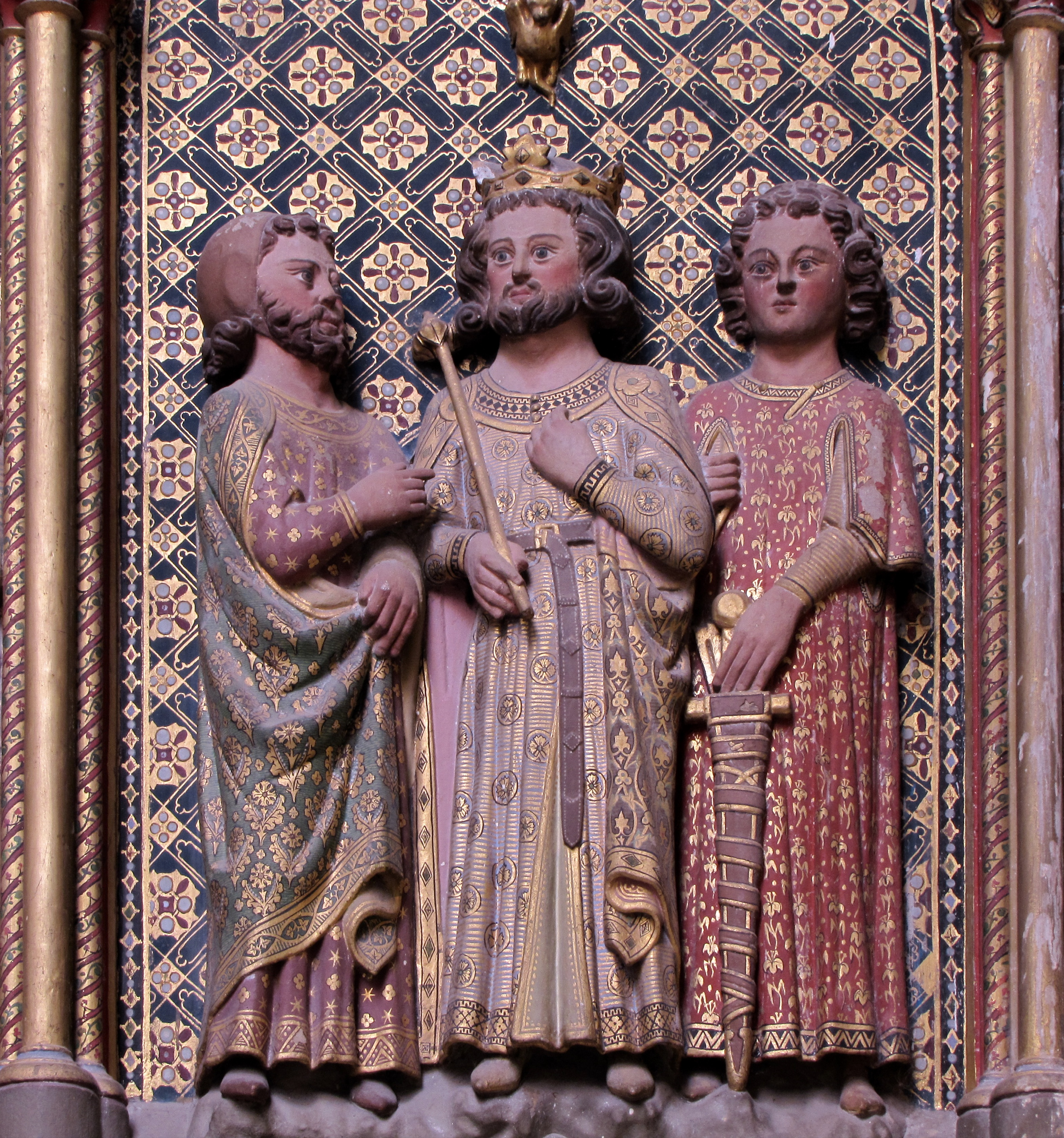
Charles in a 14th-century sandstone relief, flanked by a squire and a knight

In the early 880s, the remnants of the Great Heathen Army, defeated by Alfred the Great at the Battle of Ethandun in 878, began to settle in the Low Countries. Charles's brother Louis the Younger had opposed them with some success, but he died after a short campaign on 20 January 882, leaving his throne to Charles, who reunited the whole East Frankish kingdom.

After returning from Italy, Charles held an assembly at Worms with the purpose of dealing with the Vikings. Armies from the whole East Francia were assembled in the summer under Arnulf, Duke of Carinthia, and Henry, Count of Saxony. The chief Viking camp was then besieged at Asselt. Charles then opened negotiations with the Viking chiefs Godfrid and Sigfred. (Note: The identity of Sigfred is not known, it is potentially Sigurd Snake-in-the-Eye, but the matter is not conclusive. See also Sigfred and Halfdan) Godfrid accepted Christianity and became Charles's vassal. He was married to Gisela, daughter of Lothair II of Lotharingia. Sigfred was bribed off. Despite the insinuations of some modern historians, no contemporary account criticised Charles's actions during this campaign. In 885, fearing Godfrid and his brother-in-law, Hugh, Duke of Alsace, Charles arranged for a conference at Spijk near Lobith, where the Viking leader fell into his trap. Godfrid was executed, and Hugh was blinded and sent to Prüm.

From 882 to 884, the Wilhelminer War engulfed the March of Pannonia (later March of Austria). Arnulf of Carinthia, Charles's illegitimate nephew, made an alliance with the rebel Engelschalk II against Aribo of Austria, Charles's appointed margrave of the region. Svatopluk I, ruler of Great Moravia, agreed to help Aribo and in 884 at Kaumberg took an oath of fidelity to Charles. Though the emperor lost his vassals of the Wilhelminer family and his relationship with his nephew was broken, he gained powerful new allies in the Moravian dux and other Slavic duces of the region.

=== Rule in West Francia ===
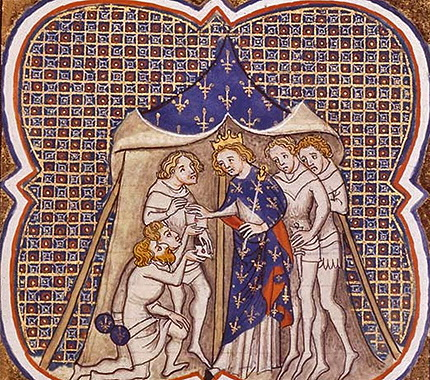
Charles the Fat receives the offer of kingship from two West Francian ambassadors (from the Grandes Chroniques de France, illustration from c. 1375–1379).

When Carloman II of West Francia died on 12 December 884, the nobles of the kingdom invited Charles to assume the kingship. Charles gladly accepted, it being the third kingdom to "fall into his lap". According to the Anglo-Saxon Chronicle, Charles succeeded to all of the kingdom of Carloman except Brittany, but this does not seem to have been true. It is likely that Charles was crowned by Geilo, Bishop of Langres, as rex in Gallia on 20 May 885 at Grand in the Vosges in southern Lorraine. Although Geilo even developed a special West Frankish seal for him, Charles's government in the West was always very distant and he left most day-to-day business to the higher nobility.

Though West Francia (the future France) was far less menaced by the Vikings than the Low Countries, it was heavily hit nonetheless. In 885, a huge fleet led by Sigfred sailed up the Seine, for the first time in years, and besieged Paris. Sigfred demanded a bribe again, but this time Charles refused. He was in Italy at the time and Odo, Count of Paris, sneaked some men through enemy lines to seek his aid. Charles sent Henry of Saxony to Paris. In 886, as disease began to spread through Paris, Odo himself went to Charles to seek support. Charles brought a large army and encircled the army of Rollo and set up a camp at Montmartre. However, Charles had no intention of fighting. He sent the attackers up the Seine to ravage Burgundy, which was in revolt. When the Vikings withdrew from France next spring, he gave them 700 pounds of promised silver. Charles's prestige in France was greatly diminished.

Charles issued a number of charters for West Frankish recipients during his stay in Paris during and after the siege. He recognised rights and privileges granted by his predecessors to recipients in the Spanish March and Provence, but especially in Neustria, where he had contact with Nantes at a time when the Breton duke Alan I was known to be powerful in the county of Nantes. It is probable that Charles granted Alan the right to be titled rex; as emperor he would have had that prerogative and Alan's use of the title appears legitimate. A charter dated to between 897 and 900 makes reference to the soul of Karolus, on whose behalf Alan had ordered prayers to be said in the monastery of Redon. This was probably Charles the Fat.

=== Succession problems ===
Charles, childless by his marriage to Richgard, tried to have Bernard, his illegitimate son by an unknown concubine, recognised as his heir in 885, but this met with opposition from several bishops. He had the support of Pope Hadrian III, whom he invited to an assembly in Worms in October 885, but the pope died on the way there, just after crossing the river Po. Hadrian was going to remove the obstructing bishops for Charles, as he doubted he could do this himself, and legitimise Bernard. Based on the unfavorable attitude shown by the chronicler responsible for the Mainz continuation of the Annales Fuldenses, the chief of Charles's opponents in this matter was most likely Liutbert, Archbishop of Mainz. Because Charles had called together the "bishops and counts of Gaul" as well as the pope to meet him at Worms, it is likely that he had plans to make Bernard King of Lotharingia. Notker the Stammerer, who considered Bernard as a possible heir, wrote in his Deeds of Charlemagne:

I will not tell you [Charles the Fat] of this [the Viking sack of the Abbey of Prüm] until I see your little son Bernard with a sword girt to his thigh.

After the failure of this first attempt, Charles set about to try again. He had the term proles (offspring) inserted into his charters (it had not been in previous years), in a likely attempt to legitimise Bernard. In early 886 Charles met the new Pope Stephen V and probably negotiated for the recognition of his illegitimate son as heir. An assembly was planned for April and May of the following year at Waiblingen. Pope Stephen cancelled his planned attendance on 30 April 887. Nevertheless, at Waiblingen, Berengar, who after a brief feud with Liutward had lost the favour of the emperor, came in early May 887, made peace with the emperor and compensated for his actions of the previous year by dispensing great gifts.

Charles eventually abandoned his plans for Bernard and instead adopted Louis of Provence as his son at an assembly at Kirchen in May. It is possible, however, that the agreement with Louis was only designed to engender support for Bernard's sub-kingship in Lotharingia. In June or July, Berengar arrived in Kirchen, probably pining to be declared Charles's heir; he may in fact have been so named in Italy, where he was acclaimed (or made himself) king immediately after Charles's deposition. Odo, Count of Paris, may have had a similar purpose in visiting Charles at Kirchen. On the other hand, the presence of these magnates at these two great assemblies may merely have been necessary to confirm Charles's illegitimate son as his heir (Waiblingen), a plan which failed when the pope refused to attend, and then to confirm Louis instead (Kirchen).

=== Deposition, death and legacy ===
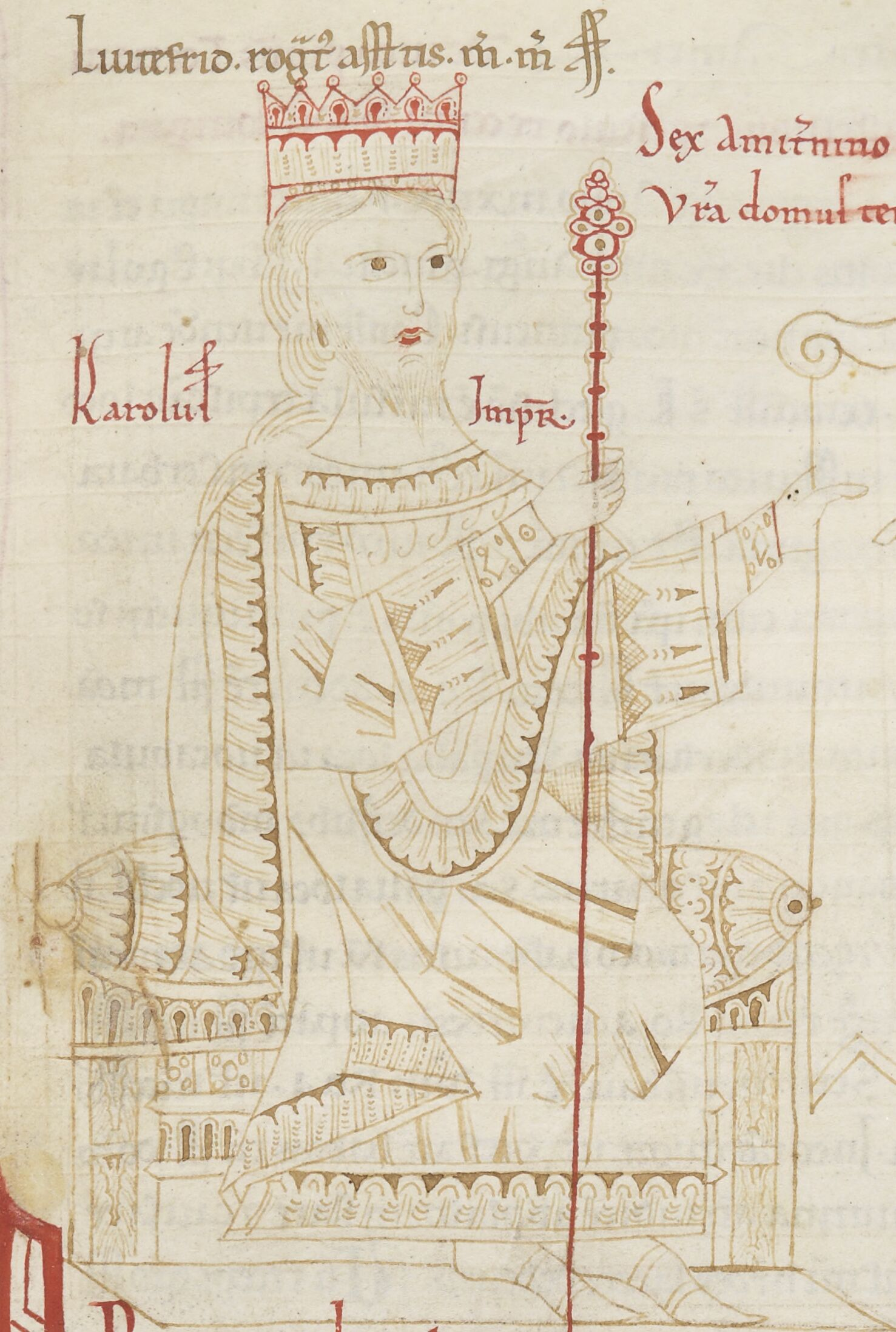
Charles the Fat in the Chartularium monasterii Casauriensis, ordinis S. Benedicti (San Clemente a Casauria, illustration from c. 1182)

With Charles increasingly seen as spineless and incompetent, matters came to a head in late 887. In the summer of that year, having given up on plans for his son's succession, Charles received Odo and Berengar, Margrave of Friuli, a relative of his, at his court. He may have accepted neither, one, or both of these as his heir in their respective kingdoms. His inner circle then began to fall apart. First, he accused his wife Richgard of having an affair with his chief minister and archchancellor, Liutward, bishop of Vercelli. She proved her innocence in an ordeal of fire and left him for the monastic life. He then turned against Liutward, who was hated by all, and removed him from office, appointing Liutbert, archbishop of Mainz, in his place.

In that year, his first cousin once removed, Ermengard of Provence, daughter of the Emperor Louis II and wife of Boso of Provence, brought her son Louis the Blind to him for protection. Charles confirmed Louis in Provence (he may even have adopted him) and allowed them to live at his court. He probably intended to make Louis heir to the whole realm and the imperium. On November, he called an assembly to Frankfurt. While there he received news that an ambitious nephew, Arnulf of Carinthia, had fomented a general rebellion and was marching into Germany with an army of Bavarians and Slavs. The next week saw the collapse of all his support in East Francia. The last to abandon him were his loyal Alemanni, though the men of Lotharingia never seem to have formally accepted his deposition. By 17 November, Charles was out of power, though the exact course of events is unknown. Aside from rebuking his faithlessness, he did little to prevent Arnulf's move—he had recently been ill again—but assured that Bernard was entrusted to his care and possibly Louis too. He asked for a few estates in Swabia on which to live out his days and thus received Naudingen (Donaueschingen). There he died six weeks later, on 13 January 888.

The Empire fell apart, never to be restored. According to Regino of Prüm, each part of the realm elected a "kinglet" from its own "bowels"—the bowels being the regions inside the realm. It is probable that Arnulf desired the whole empire, but the only part he received other than East Francia was Lotharingia. The French elected Odo, although he was opposed at first by Guy III of Spoleto, who also opposed Arnulf in Lotharingia. Guy sought the kingship in Italy after his failures in Francia, despite Berengar having already been crowned. Louis was crowned in Provence, as Charles had intended, and he sought the support of Arnulf and gained it, probably through supplication to him. Odo would eventually submit to Arnulf's supremacy as well. In Upper Burgundy, one Rudolph, a dux of the region, was elected as king in a distinctly non-Carolingian creation, probably the result of his failure to succeed in the whole of Lotharingia. In Aquitaine, Ranulf II declared himself king and took the guardianship of the young Charles the Simple, the Carolingian heir to the West, refusing to recognise Odo's election.

It is unknown if these elections were a response to Charles's East Frankish deposition or to his death. Only those of Arnulf and Berengar can be certainly placed before his death. Only the magnates of the East ever formally deposed him. He was buried with honour in Reichenau after his death and the Annales Fuldenses heap praises on his piety and godliness. Indeed, contemporary opinion of Charles is consistently kinder than later historiography, though it is a modern suggestion that his lack of apparent successes is the excusable result of near constant illness and infirmity.

Charles was the subject of a hortative piece of Latin prose, the Visio Karoli Grossi, designed to champion the cause of Louis the Blind and warn the Carolingians that their continued rule was not certain if they did not have "divine" (i.e. ecclesiastical) favour.

== See also ==
- Family tree of the German monarchs

== Bibliography ==
- Airlie, Stuart. "'Sad stories of the death of kings': Narrative Patterns and Structures of Authority in Regino of Prüm's Chronicle." In Elizabeth M. Tyler and Ross Balzaretti (eds.), Narrative and History in the Early Medieval West, pp. 105–32. Brepols, 2006.
- Duckett, Eleanor. Death and Life in the Tenth Century. University of Michigan Press, 1968.
- Leyser, Karl. Communications and Power in Medieval Europe: The Carolingian and Ottonian Centuries. London, 1994.
- MacLean, Simon. Kingship and Politics in the Late Ninth Century: Charles the Fat and the end of the Carolingian Empire. Cambridge University Press: 2003.
- Reuter, Timothy. Germany in the Early Middle Ages, c. 800–1056. Longman, 1991.
- Reuter, Timothy (trans.) The Annals of Fulda. (Manchester Medieval series, Ninth-Century Histories, Volume II.) Manchester: Manchester University Press, 1992.
- Smith, Julia M. H. Province and Empire: Brittany and the Carolingians. Cambridge University Press: 1992.

Emperor Charles III Carolingian dynasty Born: 839 Died: 13 January 888
Regnal titles
Preceded by Louis II as King of East Francia	King of Alamannia; 28 August 876 – 20 January 882	Succeeded by Himself as King of East Francia
Preceded by Carloman of Bavaria	King of Italy; 879–887	Succeeded by Berengar I
Vacant Title last held by Charles II	Carolingian emperor 881–888	Vacant Title next held by Guy
Preceded by Louis III the Younger	King of Saxony, Bavaria and Lotharingia; 20 January 882	Succeeded by Himself as King of East Francia
Preceded by Himself as King of Alemannia, Saxony, and Bavaria	King of East Francia; 20 January 882 – 17 November 887	Succeeded by Arnulf of Carinthia as King of East Francia
Preceded by Himself as King of Alemannia, Saxony, and Bavaria	King of East Francia; 20 January 882 – 17 November 887	Succeeded by Rudolph I of Burgundy as King of Upper Burgundy
Preceded by Carloman II	King of West Francia; 884–888	Succeeded by Odo as King of West Francia
Preceded by Carloman II	King of West Francia; 884–888	Succeeded by Ranulf II of Aquitaine as King of Aquitaine
