= Carloman of Bavaria =

King of Bavaria from 876 to 879

Carloman
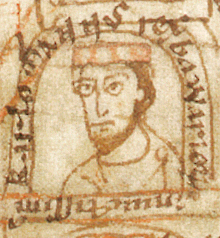
- Carloman (Karlomannus rex Bawariae), from a 12th-century manuscript

King of Bavaria
- Reign: 28 August 876 – 879
- Predecessor: Louis the German
- Successor: Louis the Younger

King of Italy
- Reign: 877–879
- Predecessor: Charles the Bald
- Successor: Charles the Fat
- Born: c. 830
- Died: 22 March 880
- Burial: Ötting, Bavaria
- Issue: Arnulf
- Dynasty: Carolingian
- Father: Louis the German
- Mother: Hemma

Carloman (German: Karlmann, Latin: Carlomannus; c. 830 – 22 March 880) was a Frankish king of the Carolingian dynasty. He was the eldest son of Louis the German, king of East Francia, and Hemma, daughter of a Bavarian count. His father appointed him governor of Carantania in 856, and commander of southeastern frontier marches in 864. Upon his father's death in 876 he became king of Bavaria. He was appointed by King Louis II of Italy as his successor, but the Kingdom of Italy was taken by his uncle Charles the Bald in 875. Carloman only conquered it in 877. In 879 he was incapacitated, perhaps by a stroke, and abdicated his domains in favour of his younger brothers: Bavaria to Louis the Younger and Italy to Charles the Fat.

== Early life ==
Carloman's birth date is unknown, but was probably around 828 or 830. His naming can be connected to his father's push to rule Alemannia around the time of his father's assembly of Worms in 829. The first member of the Carolingian dynasty named Carloman had ruled Alemannia in 741–48, and subjugated it to the Franks.

Carloman was old enough to participate in the civil war of 840–43, waged between his father and his uncles, Lothair and Charles the Bald. His first record public appearance is as the leader of an army of reinforcements from Bavaria and Alemannia which he brought to his father at Worms in 842. He subsequently led them in battle alongside his father and uncle (Charles the Bald) against his other uncle (Lothair). It was the beginning of a warlike career. Notker of Saint Gall, who bewailed the decline of the dynasty a generation later, called Carloman bellicosissimus (literally "most warlike", or in historian Eric Goldberg's words a "real ass-kicker").

In October 848, Carloman was present at his father's council in Regensburg, where the Slavic commander (dux) Pribina was rewarded for his service in defending the Bavarian frontier. In the charter confirming the grant, Carloman signed his name first among the secular magnates (after the ecclesiastics).

In the 840s, Carloman had a liaison with Liutswind, daughter of the Bavarian count Ratolt and sister-in-law of Count Sigihard of the Kraichgau. This was Carloman's first politically independent action, and it confirms his close connection to Bavaria. Around 850, Liutswind bore him a son, Arnulf. This name was chosen because it was distinctly dynastic (the founder of the Carolingian family was Bishop Arnulf of Metz), yet had never been used by a reigning king and was thus appropriate for an illegitimate eldest son. The choice of the name is the surest evidence that Liutswind and Carloman were not legally married. Around 860, Arnulf and his cousin, Hugh, the illegitimate son of Carloman's brother Louis, were both in Koblenz at the court of their grandfather, who was probably overseeing their military education and also holding them to ensure the good behaviour of their fathers.

== Guardian of the southeastern frontiers ==
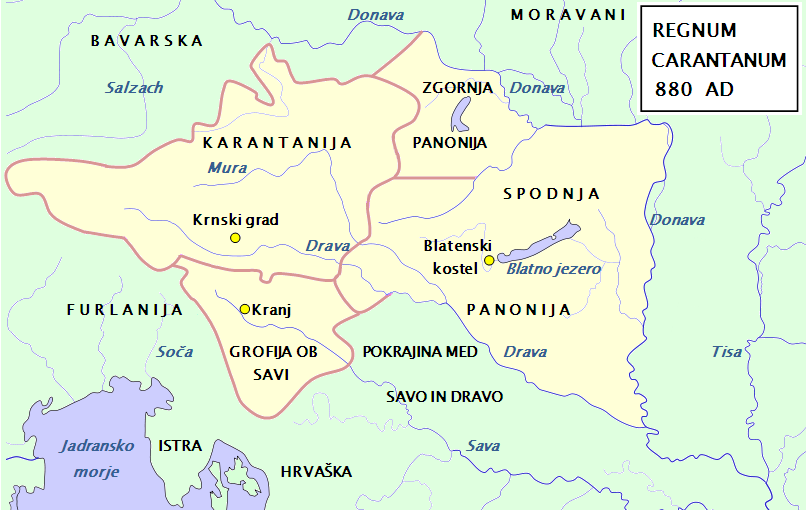
Carantania and eastern regions in the second half of the 9th century

In 856, Louis first associated Carloman with his rule by appointing him governor of Carantania. According to the Annales Fuldenses (863), he was given the title "prelate of the Carantanians" (Latin: praelatus Carantanis). Since this was his first governorship, Louis did not give him rule over the entire March of Pannonia, with traditional seat of frontier governor (prefect) at Tulln. Instead, Carloman was given rule over the inner region (Carantania), in order do gain experience, and perhaps because his father wanted to keep him from trying to seize too much power.

Gaining the first foothold of power in Carantania, Carloman moved to assume a more prominent role in governorship over the frontier regions of his father's realm. Starting from 857, Carloman was an occasional witness to his father's charters, and already in 858 he was appointed to lead a military expedition against the Great Moravia.

In 861, Carloman came into conflict with several frontier commanders in southeastern regions, expelled them from their offices, and replaced them with his loyals. That move was made without his fathers consent, and by 862 an open conflict erupted, with Carloman siding with Rastislav of Moravia and taking control over all southeastern regions, advancing further into Bavaria, up to the river Inn. An attempted reconciliation and truce between father and son failed, and in 863 king Louis invaded his son's territory, forced Carloman into submission, and took him into custody.

Replaced by count Gundachar, who was appointed governor of eastern marches by king Louis (863), prince Carloman remained in his father custody until 864, when he escaped and returned to Carantania. Welcomed by supporters, he assumed power in the province. At that time, king Louis was campaigning against Moravia, but ceased further operations and moved south, towards Carantania. Conflict was avoided by reconciliation. Father and son met and reached an agreement. Carloman submitted to his father and in return he was granted governorship over eastern marches.

Carloman's letter to his father from 869 survives, describing conditions on the frontier. In 870, he succeeded in establishing Frankish domination over Great Moravia, through arrangement with Svatopluk, who captured his uncle Rastislav of Moravia, ruling prince of Moravia, and gave him over to Carloman. During the following Frankish invasion, Moravian archbishop Methodius was also captured and sent to Carloman. In 871, he managed to capture Svatopluk, thus establishing direct control over the entire principality, but soon decided to reinstall him, in order to pacify the country. That proved to be disastrous, since Svatopluk, as soon as reaching Moravia, turned against Carloman, inflicting severe losses on Frankish army.

In 873, after several interventions of Pope John VIII, including those made to Carloman, a peace settlement was reached in Forchheim, between king Louis and envoys of Svatopluk, thus concluding the state of war on eastern borders.

== Division of Frankfurt ==
In order to prevent future dynastic conflicts, king Louis decided to regulate the position of his three sons within the government. In 865, an arrangement on the future succession was reached and promulgated in Frankfurt, thus becoming known as the Division of Frankfurt. Bavaria and southeastern marches were designated to Carloman, Saxony and Franconia to Louis the Younger, and Alamannia to Charles the Fat. Princes were to become rulers of designated domains only upon their father's death. None of them was given the title of a king during his father's lifetime, but their position within the state affairs was regulated in detail, with king Louis keeping all of the main prerogatives of royal power.

At the same time, all of king's sons married into the local aristocracy of the regions marked out for them. Carloman married the daughter of a Bavarian military leader (dux) named Ernest, whom the Annales Bertiniani describe as "the greatest of all the king's great men". This marriage must have taken place before Ernest's disgrace and dismissal in 861, for Louis the German strongly disapproved of his second son's seeking a marriage with family that had likewise been disgraced in 858–59.

By the 870s, according to the Annales Bertiniani, at the time being composed by Archbishop Hincmar of Reims, Carloman's mother, Emma, was encouraging her husband to favour Carloman over his brothers. This is the first recorded involvement of Emma in politics, and it may relate to Louis's illness during 869–70. On the other hand, historian Ernst Dümmler thought Carloman must have been a "mamma's boy" (Muttersöhnchen).

== Ruler of Bavaria ==
Carolingian empire in 876, with Carloman′s Bavaria in blue

In Bavaria, Carloman re-founded the palace and monastery at Ötting. He dedicated it to the Virgin Mary and "numerous other saints whose relics we were able to collect with God's help". He appointed his father's friend, the linguistic scholar Baldo, as his chancellor. In 878, he may have been the object of an assassination attempt. According to the Annales Iuvavenses, the king "was surrounded by Count Ermenpert and some of his soldiers" at Ergolding, but the count apparently fled to West Francia, where he was received by Louis the Stammerer.

Carloman groomed his illegitimate son Arnulf for the succession in Bavaria. In a charter issued at Regensburg, he called him "regal son" (filius regalis), a term similar to "the king's son" (filius regis), which was the standard title of a legitimate royal son. This policy had supporters, like Abbot Regino of Prüm and the monks of Saint Gall, but also detractors, who appealed to Carloman's brother Louis. In early 879, Carloman was incapacitated by illness, perhaps a stroke. Louis came to Bavaria to receive the recognition of the aristocracy as future king. By Easter he had left, and Arnulf took control of the kingdom in his father's name. He dismissed some prominent counts, who appealed to Louis to restore them. Carloman tried to legitimise Arnulf's actions by adding his son's name to the prayer provisions of his charters, but in November Louis came to Bavaria to force a resolution of the succession. He restored the deposed counts and Carloman formally abdicated his Bavarian throne to his brother. He also placed Arnulf under Louis's protection. His brother Charles dated his reign in Italy from November 879, so presumably Carloman abdicated that kingdom at the same time as Bavaria.

== Ruler of Italy ==
Carolingian empire in 877, with Carloman′s Bavaria and Italy

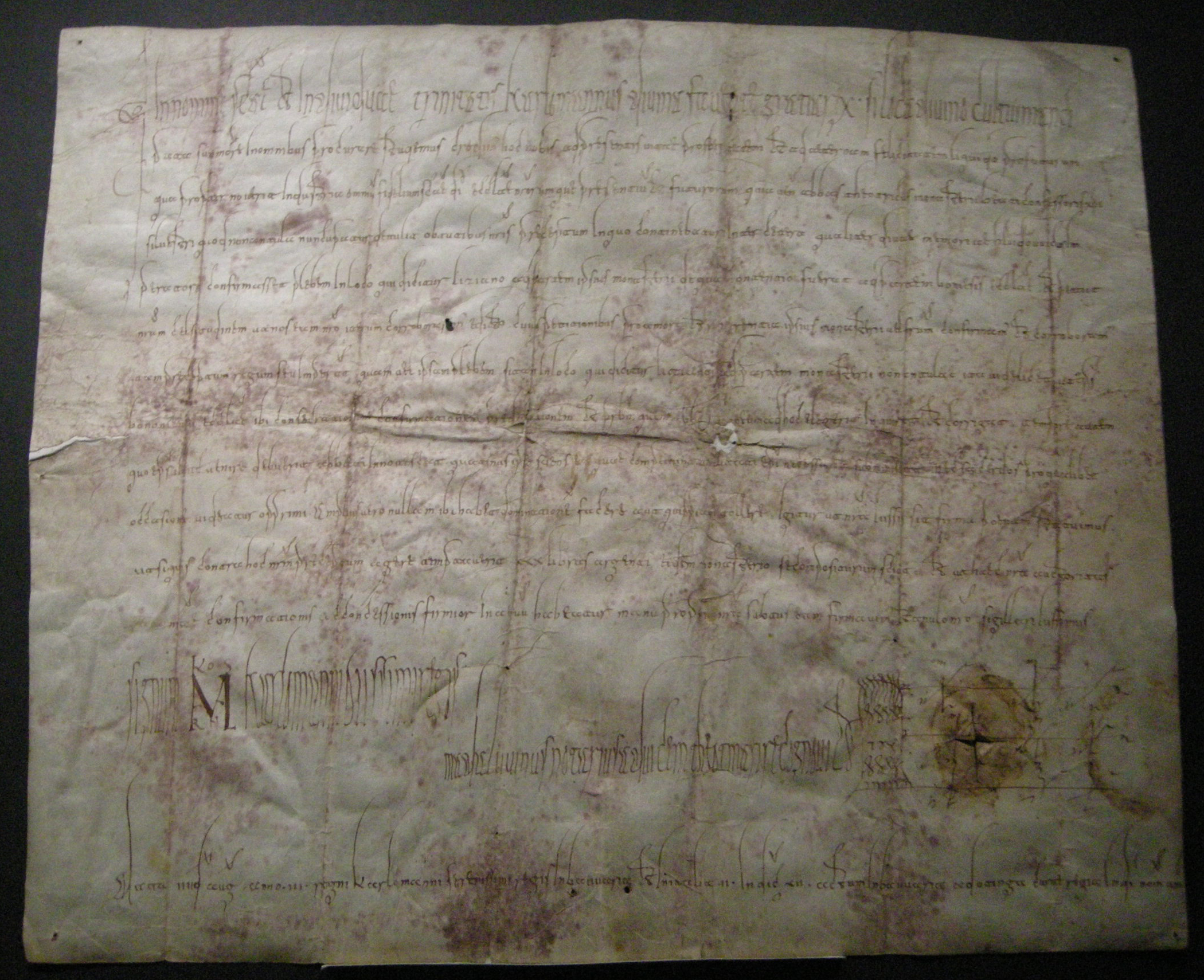
An original charter in which Carloman confirms the Abbey of Nonantola in its possession of the rural baptistery (pieve) in Lizzano

On 12 August 875, Louis II of Italy died and his kingdom was claimed by Louis the German for his sons Carloman and Charles and by Charles the Bald. Pope John VIII, dealing with the constant threat of raiders from Muslim Sicily, sided with Charles the Bald. Carloman led an army into Italy, where he granted a diploma to the monastery of San Clemente a Casauria, one of Louis II's most favored houses. In the diploma Carloman declared himself Louis's chosen successor. According to the Annales Fuldenses, Charles had to offer him "a huge sum in gold and silver and precious stones" to get him to leave Italy. On 28 August 876, Louis died and his sons became kings in their allotted kingdoms. On 6 October 877, Charles the Bald died and later that month Carloman succeeded in having himself elected King of Italy by the nobles assembled in Pavia. The lure of Italy was "the looting which was apparently acceptable when a king first took over a kingdom", providing rewards that could be shared out among followers and more than offset the cost of raising an army and crossing the Alps. Carloman was one of only two Carolingian kings of Italy—his brother and successor Charles being the other—who did not issue a capitulary at the beginning of his reign in order to proclaim his legitimacy and affirm his keeping to traditions of good government.

In Italy, Carloman confirmed his predecessor's act that made bishops permanent missi dominici (royal representatives) in their dioceses. He added to the new regulation by expanding the jurisdiction of individual bishops to gain their loyalty. His grant to Bishop Wibod of Parma of the districtio, or temporal authority in the district outside the city walls, was the first grant of its kind to a bishop. By the time of Carloman's death, the confirmation of a predecessor's concessions to the episcopate and the negotiating of new ones in exchange for support had become an Italian tradition. In 876, Charles had granted Pope John jurisdictional rights in the duchies of Spoleto and Camerino. After his succession, Carloman supported the dukes, Lambert I and Guy III, who had always claimed the rights as royal representatives which Charles had offered the pope.

In 879, Carloman donated land to the monastery of Santa Cristina by the royal palace at Olona. Although the monastery was reportedly built during the eighth century, the first record of its dedication to Cristina is found in Carloman's charter. In a letter of 7 June 879, Pope John, having failed to convince Louis the Stammerer, Charles the Bald's heir, to come to Italy for its defence, appealed to Carloman, whom he had previously rejected. It was too late; by then Carloman was incapacitated. Shortly before his abdication, he granted a complex of estates around Olona to the church of San Sisto, which had been founded by Queen Engelberga in Piacenza.

In Italy, Carloman had denarii (pennies) minted at Milan and Pavia. Those minted at Milan generally bore the inscription CARLOMAN REX, while those of Pavia bore HCARLEMANNVS RE. All had a stylised temple on one side. Carloman did not issue coinage in Bavaria.

== Illness and death ==
Regarding Carloman's condition, the Annales Fuldenses (879) record that he lost his voice, but was still able to communicate by writing. Regino of Prüm, writing in his chronicle for the year 880, recalls that he was "erudite in letters" (litteris eruditus), which meant he could write Latin. Regino's entire encomium on Carloman goes:

That most excellent king was learned in letters, devoted to the Christian religion, just, peaceful, and morally upright. The beauty of his body was exceptional, and his physical strength was a wonder to behold. He possessed a very warlike spirit. He waged numerous wars against the Slavic kingdoms with his father, and even more without him. He always returned the victor in triumph and expanded the borders of his empire with glorious iron. He was mild to his own men and a living terror to his enemies. He was charming in speech, humble, and endowed with great cleverness for managing the business of the realm. He was so skilled that he was the very embodiment of royal majesty.

Most sources place Carloman's death in March 880, but the Annales Iuvavenses place it on 21 September. He was buried in the chapel of his palace at Ötting. Carloman left one illegitimate son, Arnulf, who continued as margrave of Carinthia during the reigns of Carloman's brothers, but in 887 became king of East Francia and in 896 emperor.

== Sources ==
- Bowlus, Charles R. (1995). Franks, Moravians, and Magyars: The Struggle for the Middle Danube, 788-907. Philadelphia: University of Pennsylvania Press. ISBN 9780812232769.
- Chisholm, Hugh, ed. (1911). "Carloman (King of Bavaria and Italy)" . Encyclopædia Britannica. Vol. 5 (11th ed.). Cambridge University Press. pp. 342–343.
- Engreen, Fred E. (1945). "Pope John the Eighth and the Arabs". Speculum. 20 (3): 318–30. doi:10.2307/2854614. JSTOR 2854614. S2CID 154749195.
- Goldberg, Eric J. (2006). Struggle for Empire: Kingship and Conflict under Louis the German, 817-876. Ithaca, NY: Cornell University Press. ISBN 9780801438905.
- Grierson, Philip; Blackburn, Mark (1986). Medieval European Coinage, With a Catalogue of the Coins in the Fitzwilliam Museum, Volume 1: The Early Middle Ages (5th–10th Centuries). Cambridge: Cambridge University Press.
- MacLean, Simon (2003). Kingship and Politics in the Late Ninth Century: Charles the Fat and the End of the Carolingian Empire. Cambridge: Cambridge University Press. ISBN 9781139440295.
- MacLean, Simon (2010). "Legislation and Politics in Late Carolingian Italy: The Ravenna Constitutions". Early Medieval Europe. 18 (4): 394–416. doi:10.1111/j.1468-0254.2010.00304.x. hdl:10023/4177. S2CID 154906554.
- Reuter, Timothy (1991). Germany in the Early Middle Ages c. 800–1056. Longman.
- Riezler, Sigmund von (1882). "Karlmann, König von Baiern und von Italien". Allgemeine Deutsche Biographie. Vol. 15. Leipzig: Duncker und Humblot. pp. 397–400.
- Schieffer, Theodor (1977). "Karlmann". Neue Deutsche Biographie. Vol. 11. Berlin: Duncker und Humblot. pp. 275f.

Carloman of Bavaria Carolingian dynasty Born: c. 830 Died: 22 March 880
Regnal titles
Preceded by Louis the German as King of Eastern Francia	King of Bavaria; 876–880	Succeeded by Louis the Younger
Preceded by Charles the Bald	King of Italy; 877–880	Succeeded by Charles the Fat
Other offices
Preceded by Radbod as count	Governor of Carantania and the Pannonian March; 856–863 and 864–876	Succeeded by Aribo as count
