= Aimoin of Saint-Germain-des-Prés =

Aimoin (died 9 June 889) was a monk of Saint-Germain-des-Prés from before 845. From 872 he was the abbey's chancellor (archivist) and chief copyist, overseeing the scriptorium. He was the teacher of Abbo Cernuus.

Aimoin's chief interests were relics and miracles, and his writings mostly hagiography. Around 874 he wrote De miraculis sancti Germani ("On the Miracles of Saint Germain"), and De Normanorum gestis circa Parisiacam urbem et de divine in eos ultione tempore Caroli calvi ("On the Deeds of the Normans at the Siege of the City of Paris and of the Divine Vengeance upon Them in the Time of Charles the Bald"), which only survives as a single fragment. It is an important source for contemporary Viking raids. Both of these were first edited in the second volume of Historiae Francorum Scriptores, published at Paris in 1639–49.
