= Carloman II =

King of West Francia from 879 to 884

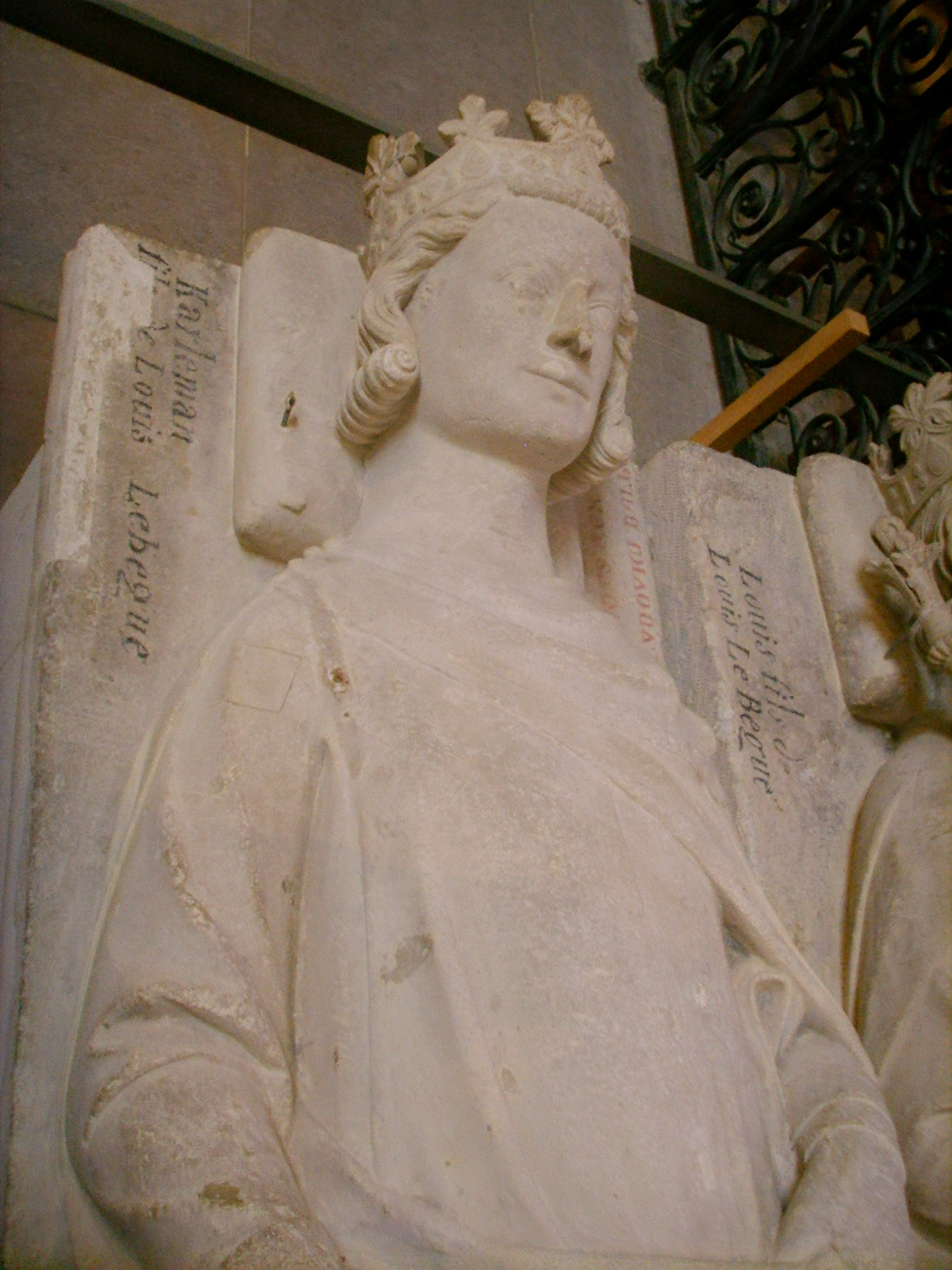
- 1264 gisant of Carloman, Basilica of Saint-Denis

King of West Francia
- Reign: 10 April 879 – 6 December 884
- Coronation: September 879
- Predecessor: Louis II
- Successor: Charles the Fat
- Co-Monarch: Louis III (879–882)
- Born: c. 866
- Died: 6 December 884 (aged c. 18) near Les Andelys
- Burial: Basilica of Saint-Denis
- Dynasty: Carolingian
- Father: Louis the Stammerer
- Mother: Ansgarde of Burgundy

Carloman II (c. 866 – 6 December 884) was the King of West Francia (future France) from 879 until his death. A member of the Carolingians, he and his elder brother Louis III, divided the kingdom between themselves and ruled jointly until the latter's death in 882. Thereafter Carloman ruled alone until his own death. He was the second son of King Louis the Stammerer and Queen Ansgarde.

== Early life ==
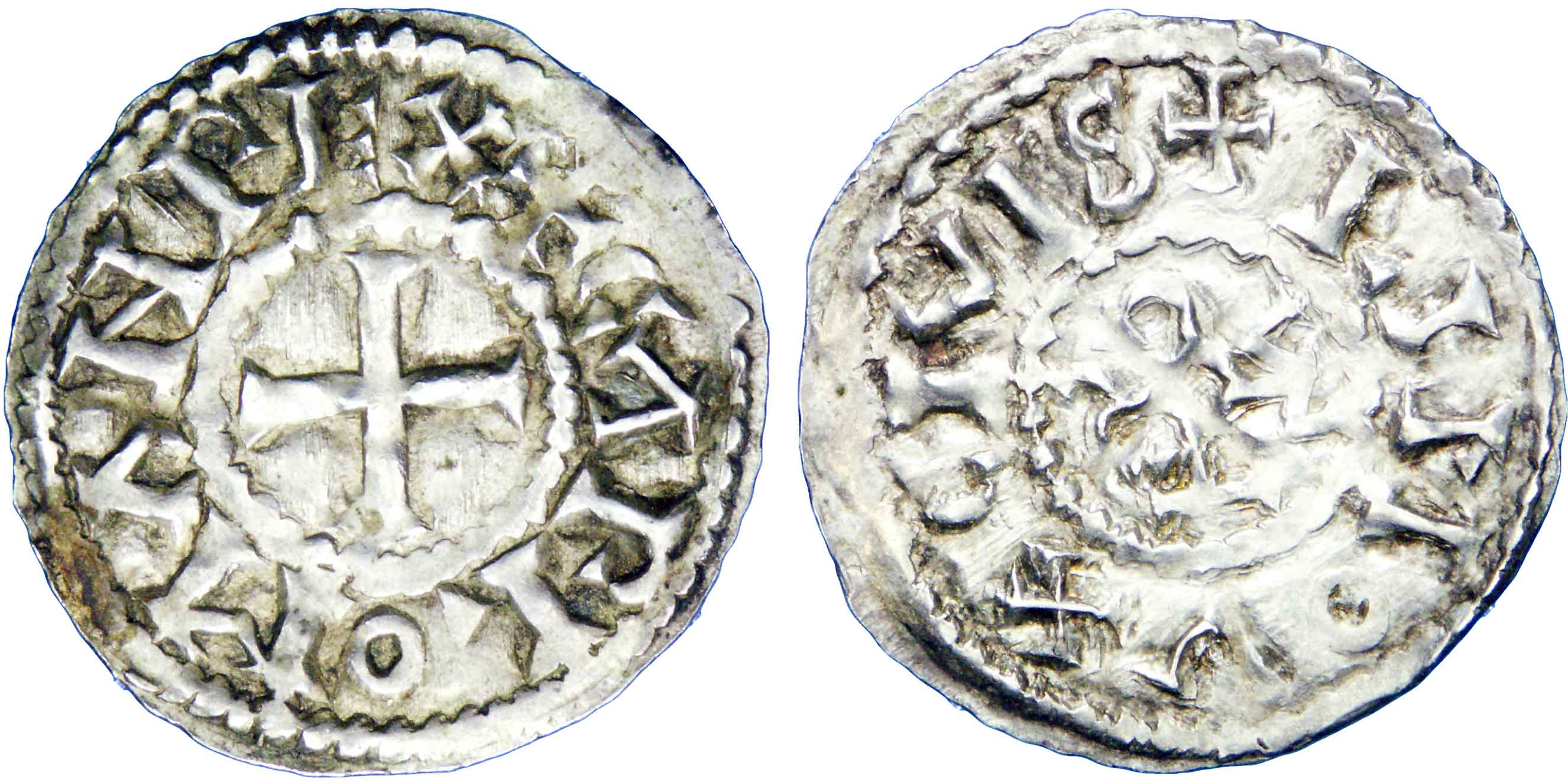
A denarius of Carloman II

Carloman II was born around 866 as the second son of King Louis II the Stammerer and Ansgarde of Burgundy. His grandfather was Charles the Bald, himself a grandson of Charlemagne, placing him firmly within the prestigious Carolingian dynasty. Carloman and his older brother Louis were born while their father was still King of Aquitaine, before Louis the Stammerer ascended to the throne of West Francia.

== Succession to the throne ==
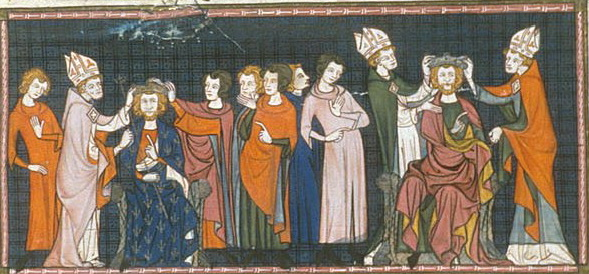
The coronation of Carloman (left) and his elder brother, who is shown seated higher and crowned by two bishops

Upon Louis the Stammerer's death, some Frankish nobles advocated electing Louis III as the sole king, but eventually both brothers were elected kings. They were both crowned in September 879. Some doubts were cast upon the legitimacy of their birth, but these disappeared after their victory over the Vikings on November of that year. In March 880, the brothers divided their father's realm at Amiens, Carloman receiving the southern kingdoms of Burgundy and Aquitaine.

== Military Campaigns ==
The realm of Carloman II after the division of the Carolingian Empire in March 880 is shown in red

=== Against Boso of Provence ===
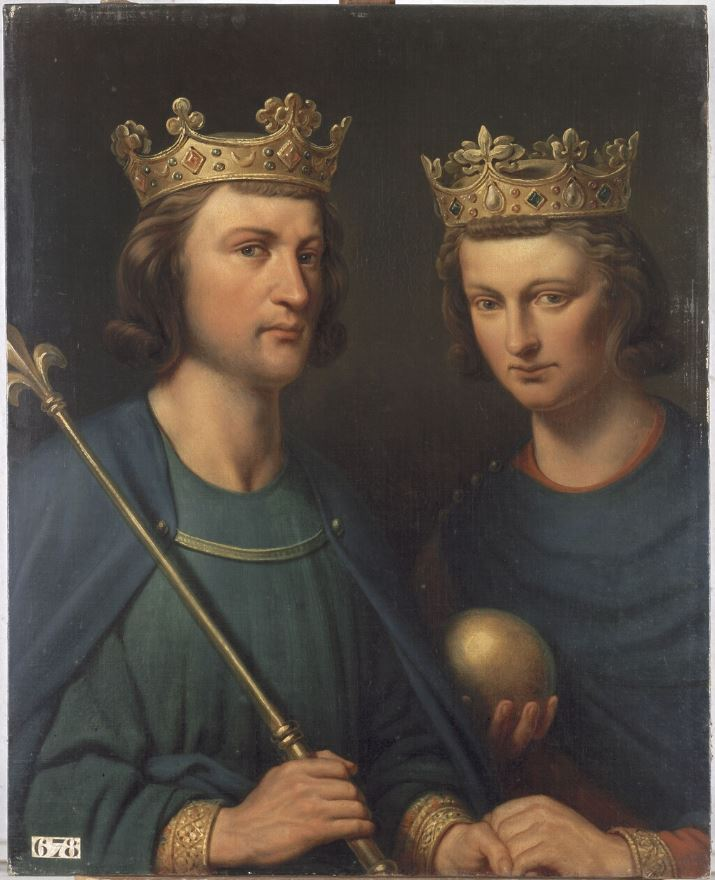
Artistic representation of Louis III & Carloman II, as part of a large collection of commissioned paintings by Louis Philippe I of all the French monarchs. (Charles Auguste Steuben, ca. 1837).

One of the first major challenges faced by the young kings was the rebellion of Duke Boso of Provence, who had renounced his allegiance to both brothers and had himself elected King of Provence in October 879. In 880, Carloman and Louis III marched against Boso and successfully captured the northern parts of his realm. They initiated a siege of Vienne, Boso's stronghold, which would last for two years. While Boso fled to the hills, the brothers maintained the siege, though they were unable to capture the city immediately. The city was finally taken in 882 by Richard, Duke of Burgundy, after Carloman and Louis had received assistance from their cousin Charles the Fat, who ruled East Francia and the Kingdom of Italy.

=== Against the Vikings ===
Like many rulers of this era, Carloman II spent much of his reign defending his territories against Viking raiders. Following the Battle of Thimeon near Charleroi in February 880, where the Vikings had been defeated by Louis the Younger of East Francia, the raiders resumed their attacks on West Francia.

After taking Kortrijk in November 880, the Vikings raided Arras and Cambrai in December, and later in 881, they sacked Amiens and Corbie. On August 3, 881, Carloman and his brother Louis III achieved a significant victory against the Vikings at the Battle of Saucourt-en-Vimeu.

== Sole Rule ==
When Louis III died unexpectedly in August 882 at the young age of 19, Carloman became the sole ruler of West Francia.

The kingdom Carloman inherited was in a deplorable condition, partly due to repeated incursions from Viking raiders. His power was significantly limited by rebellious nobles, especially in Burgundy. Despite these challenges, Carloman continued to defend his territories and maintain the governance structures established by his Carolingian predecessors.

== Death ==
Carloman II died near Les Andelys while hunting on December 884. He was accidentally stabbed in the leg by his servant Bertoldus while they were attacked by a wild boar. Carloman survived but died seven days later, on 5–6 December. He was only about 18 years old. Some modern sources give his death date as 12 December, but this is not corroborated by contemporary sources. Carloman's land were inherited by his cousin, the emperor Charles the Fat.

== Sources ==
- Goldberg, Eric J. (2006). Struggle for Empire: Kingship and Conflict under Louis the German, 817-876. Ithaca, NY: Cornell University Press. ISBN 978-0-8014-3890-5.
- MacLean, Simon (2001). "The Carolingian response to the revolt of Boso, 879–887". French Historical Studies. 10 (1): 21–48. doi:10.1111/1468-0254.00078.
- MacLean, Simon (2003). Kingship and Politics in the Late Ninth Century: Charles the Fat and the end of the Carolingian Empire. New York: Cambridge University Press.
- McKitterick, Rosamond (1983). The Frankish Kingdoms Under the Carolingians, 751-987. Harlow: Longman. ISBN 978-0-582-49005-5.
- McKitterick, Rosamond (2008). Charlemagne: The Formation of a European Identity. Cambridge: Cambridge University Press. ISBN 978-1-139-47285-2.
- Reuter, Timothy (2013) [1991]. Germany in the Early Middle Ages c. 800–1056. London and New York: Routledge.
- Reuter, Timothy (2006). Medieval Polities and Modern Mentalities. Cambridge: Cambridge University Press.
- West, Charles (2023). The Fall of a Carolingian Kingdom: Lotharingia, 855–869. Toronto: University of Toronto Press.

Carloman II Carolingian dynasty Born: c. 866 Died: 6 December 884
Preceded by Louis II	King of West Francia; 10 April 879 – 6 December 884 with Louis III (10 April 879 – 5 August 882)	Succeeded by Charles the Fat
