= Ansgarde of Burgundy =

9th-century queen of Aquitaine

Ansgarde of Burgundy (d. 880/882) was a French queen of Aquitaine, but never of West Francia, and the daughter of Hardouin of Burgundy. She secretly married Louis the Stammerer before he was king, in 862, against the will of his father, Charles the Bald. They had two sons, who later became Louis III of France and Carloman II.

Because Charles the Bald wished to marry his son Louis to Adelaide of Paris, he allegedly forced Louis to seek a papal annulment of the marriage to Ansgarde. Thus, Louis repudiated Ansgarde, and Adelaide married Louis in February 875. However, this strange situation muddied the waters around the legitimacy of Louis' marriages, and his potential heirs. If the marriage to Ansgarde was invalid (in some cases a marriage without a parent's approval could be considered invalid), then their sons were not legitimate. If, however, the marriage to Ansgarde was valid, then the marriage to Adelaide would be invalid, because Louis first wife was still alive, and any heirs born to Adelaide would be illegitimate. In 878, the reigning pope, John VIII, was unwilling to crown Adelaide, possibly indicating that he viewed Louis' second marriage as invalid.

Ansgarde was thus repudiated, but at the death of Louis in 879 she worked to ensure that her sons could mount the throne of France themselves. To that end, she sought to revisit the subject of her divorce with the archbishop of Reims. Adelaide, however, was pregnant, and gave birth to a son on September 17 of that year, which thus called into doubt the inheritance of Ansgarde's own sons.

Ansgarde and her sons attacked Adelaide's marriage, accusing her of adultery; consequently, Louis and Carloman mounted the throne together. However, both died without issue, and after a long and difficult process Adelaide finally saw her son confirmed as Charles III, the only legitimate heir to the throne.

Ansgarde passes into obscurity after this episode, and the date of her death is not conclusively known.
