= Hugh of Saxony =

Frankish prince (ca. 850 – 880)

- Born: c. 850
- Died: February 880
- Dynasty: Carolingian
- Father: Louis the Younger

Hugh of Saxony (ca. 850 – 880) was a Frankish prince, and a member of the Carolingian dynasty. He was born in Saxony around 850, the illegitimate son of Louis the Younger and an unnamed concubine. It is possible that he was also the brother of another illegitimate son, Bernhard. He was born during the reign of his grandfather Louis the German.

At an early age, Hugh was appointed count of Saxony. He was immediately dispatched to the East Saxon border, whereafter he is known to have fought in border skirmishes with both Hungarian and Viking forces. In 880, he was killed at the Battle of Thimeon by Viking raiders.

== Sources ==
- McKitterick, Rosamond (1995). The Carolingians and the Written Word. Cambridge University Press.
