= Battle of Thimeon =

880 battle during the Viking invasions of West Francia

Coordinates: 50°24′0″N 4°26′0″E

The Battle of Thiméon was a Frankish victory over the Vikings near Thiméon (near modern Charleroi, Wallonia) north of the Sambre in February 880.

In 879, Vikings from England settled on the river Scheldt. After celebrating Christmas at Frankfurt am Main that year and signing the Treaty of Ribemont with Louis III and Carloman II of West Francia, Louis the Younger of East Francia marched an army northward on the Viking settlement. The battle was a rout for the Vikings, 5,000 of whom were killed, but the Frankish king also sustained a heavy loss: his only surviving son, the illegitimate Hugh, was killed in action.

== Sources ==
- McKitterick, Rosamond (1995). The Carolingians and the Written Word. Cambridge: Cambridge University Press. OCLC 256833495. Wikidata Q131149734.
