= Louis the Younger =

- Rex Francorum
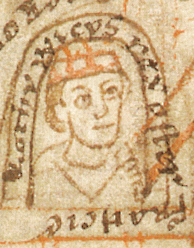
- Depiction from a 12th-century manuscript

King of Saxony
- Reign: 28 August 876 – 20 January 882
- Predecessor: Louis II as King of East Francia
- Successor: Charles the Fat

King of Bavaria
- Reign: 22 March 880 – 20 January 882
- Predecessor: Carloman
- Successor: Charles the Fat
- Born: 830 or 835
- Died: 20 January 882; Frankfurt, East Francia
- Burial: Lorsch Abbey
- Spouse: Liutgard of Saxony
- Issue: Hugh; Louis; Bernhard; Hildegard
- House: Carolingian
- Father: Louis II
- Mother: Emma of Altdorf

Louis the Younger (830/835 – 20 January 882), sometimes called Louis the Saxon or Louis III, was the second of three sons of king Louis the German and queen Hemma, with his brothers being the elder Carloman and younger Charles. They all succeeded their father as kings in Eastern Francia on 28 August 876, in accordance with the prearranged partition, with Carloman ruling over Bavaria and the Pannonian March, Louis over Franconia, Saxony and Thuringia, and Charles over Alamannia. Louis and Charles also jointly ruled over eastern parts of Lotharingia. In 879-880, Louis acquired the western part of Lotharingia. In 880, Carloman died and his realm was inherited by Louis. By 881, the youngest brother Charles secured rule over Italy, and was crowned as emperor. Louis died in 882, without legitimate descendants, and was succeeded in all his territories, which encompassed most of East Francia, by his brother Charles.

== Military youth ==
Realms of the Carolingian Empire in 881: * Louis the Younger: Saxony, Franconia, Bavaria, Lotharingia (green) * Charles the Fat: Italy, Alamannia, Upper Burgundy (pink) * Louis III: North-West Francia - Neustria (violet) * Carloman II: South-West Francia - Aquitaine (dark red) * Boso: Lower Burgundy with Provence (orange)

As a young man, Louis was deployed in military operations against the Abodrites to the east in 858 and 862. In 854, at the invitation of the nobles of Aquitaine opposed to Charles the Bald and Pepin II, and coaxed by his father and his cousin Charles, Archbishop of Mainz, he crossed into Gaul at the head of an army, intent on receiving the Aquitainian crown. He marched as far as Limoges before turning back.

Back home, Louis forged close ties with the nobles of East Francia and became increasingly independent from his father. He engaged himself to the daughter of Count Adalard and, in 865, he and his brother Charles joined in rebellion against their father. This flirtation with revolt was brief, however, and Louis, Charles, and their father were reconciled later that year, though the elder Louis was forced to make a division of the remainder of his territories between his two sons. Carloman had already been given the subregulus of Bavaria in 864, now Louis received Saxony, Thuringia, and Franconia and Charles Alamannia and Rhaetia.

In 869, Louis married Liutgard, daughter of Liudolf, Duke of Saxony, at Aschaffenburg. Liutgard was a strong-willed and politically ambitious woman and later on spurred her husband to pursue ambitious goals. This match increased tensions between father and son and in 871 and in 873, Louis rebelled, but, on each occasion, he later reconciled with his father.

== Rule in Saxony and Franconia ==
Upon his father's death in 876, Louis fully inherited his subkingdoms, bearing the title rex Francorum ("king of the Franks"). Louis the Younger considered himself the true heir of Louis the German and as his father died in 876, Louis buried him in the abbey of Lorsch, in his own territories, in order to emphasise his primacy to his brothers. Louis also retained his father's chief advisor, Liutbert, Archbishop of Mainz. He and his brother ruled their kingdoms independently but cooperatively and never at war.

=== Acquisition of Lotharingia and Bavaria ===
Louis's rule was immediately threatened by Charles the Bald, who tried to annex the eastern parts of Lotharingia and maybe even to achieve supremacy over his nephew. Louis brought war on Charles and, on 8 October 876 at Andernach, he defeated the much-larger host of West Francia. The East Frankish army displayed superiority in both unity and tactics, and the young king had even dressed his soldiers in white garments so that they appeared as an army of spirits.

After this victory, Louis the German's three sons met in November at Nördlingen to discuss the division of their father's kingdom and to have their hosts swear allegiance. According to the plan drawn up in 865, which their father, despite all his sons' rebellions, had confirmed in 872, Carloman received Bavaria, Charles Swabia, and Louis Saxony, Franconia, and Thuringia. Throughout his reign, though he is always called "King of Saxony" by historians, he never visited Saxony proper, though it formed the bulk of his territory. At the end of 877, the brothers assembled again to discuss the administration of their half of Lotharingia. After Carloman relinquished his claim, the realm was divided between Louis and Charles, who again met in September 878 in Alsatia. In 879, Carloman was incapacitated by a stroke and named Louis as his successor (and erstwhile regent) in Bavaria. Louis received it outright a year later when Carloman expired.

In November 878, after the death of Charles the Bald, his heir, Louis the Stammerer, and the latter's cousin Louis the Younger promised each other to respect the succession of their respective sons and to issue no claims contrary to that, at Voeren (Fourons in French). This Treaty of Fouron was soon put to the test, when Louis the Stammerer died in April 879. A party of western nobles led by Abbot Joscelin invited Louis the Younger to succeed to the rule of the western kingdom. Since his wife Liutgard also advocated heeding this call, Louis invaded West Francia. He marched as far as Verdun, but after the new kings Louis III and Carloman ceded their part of Lotharingia to the invader, Louis retreated. In February 880, this gain was confirmed by the Treaty of Ribemont, signed near Saint Quentin. This treaty determined the border of the two kingdoms, which was to remain unchanged until the fourteenth century.

=== Relationship with the nobility ===
In contrast to his father, Louis the Younger preferred reconciling royal interests with those of the nobility and avoided confrontation. He managed to bind powerful families to the king, including the Liudovingian relatives of his wife, that later themselves became kings and emperors. Louis mostly stayed in the Rhineland, avoiding Saxony or his eastern borders. Louis did visit Bavaria on two occasions, but mostly left it to the government of his illegitimate nephew, Carloman's son, Arnulf, Duke of Carinthia.

=== Viking incursions ===
Since the summer of 879, Vikings had been increasing their attacks on the Frankish kingdom and occasionally penetrated deeply into the interior of the land. Louis's kingdom was the most hard-hit after that of West Francia. In February 880, Louis confronted and defeated a Norse host at the Battle of Thimeon (near modern Charleroi). His son Hugh, however, was killed in this battle. The next year, Louis III, King of West Francia, defeated the Norse at the battle of Saucourt. Louis the Younger also drove the Norse out of the royal palace of Nijmegen, which they had occupied. In the same month, a Saxon host commanded by Duke Bruno, the king's brother-in-law, suffered a heavy defeat near Hamburg and Bruno and many other Saxon nobles fell.

== Death and succession ==
Louis fell sick in 881 and died in Frankfurt on 20 January 882. He was buried beside his father in the abbey of Lorsch. By his wife Liutgard of Saxony, he had had a son called Louis (877–879), who died in a fall from a palace window, and a daughter called Hildegard (878–895). Louis had also fathered an illegitimate son, Hugh (855/60 – February 880), either with the daughter of Adalard or with an earlier concubine. Since he left no heir, all his territories fell to his brother Charles, who thus could reunite the entire East Frankish kingdom. Hildegard later joined with the Bavarian magnate Engeldeo in conspiring against King Arnulf and was deprived of her "public honours" in 895, according to the Annals of Fulda.

== Family ==
Louis the Younger married Liutgard of Saxony (died 885), a daughter of Duke Liudolf of Saxony, who was grandfather of King Henry I of Germany.

- Louis (876 - November 879)
- Hildegard (875/878 or 881 - after 900)
- Bernhart
- Hugo (ca. 855/860 - February 880), illegitimate son
- Adalhard, illegitimate son

== See also ==
- Kings of Germany family tree

== Sources ==
- Bowlus, Charles R. (1995). Franks, Moravians, and Magyars: The Struggle for the Middle Danube, 788-907. Philadelphia: University of Pennsylvania Press.
- Goldberg, Eric J. (2006). Struggle for Empire: Kingship and Conflict under Louis the German, 817-876. Ithaca, NY: Cornell University Press.
- MacLean, Simon (2009). History and Politics in Late Carolingian and Ottonian Europe: The Chronicle of Regino of Prüm and Adalbert of Magdeburg. Manchester and New York: Manchester University Press.
- McKitterick, Rosamond (1983). The Frankish Kingdoms Under the Carolingians, 751-987. Harlow: Longman.
- McKitterick, Rosamond (1989). The Carolingians and the Written Word. Cambridge: Cambridge University Press.
- Nelson, Janet L. (1991). The Annals of St-Bertin. Manchester: Manchester University Press.
- Reuter, Timothy (1992). The Annals of Fulda. Manchester: Manchester University Press. ISBN 9780719034589.
- Reuter, Timothy (2013) [1991]. Germany in the Early Middle Ages c. 800–1056. London and New York: Routledge.

Louis III Carolingian dynasty Born: 830/835 Died: 20 January 882
Regnal titles
Preceded by Louis the German as king of East Francia	King of East Francia; 876 –882	Succeeded by Charles the Fat
Preceded by Carloman	King of Bavaria; 880–882	Succeeded by Charles the Fat
Vacant Title last held by Lothair II	King of Lotharingia; 880–882	Succeeded by Charles the Fat
