= Louis III of France =

King of West Francia from 879 to 882

Louis III
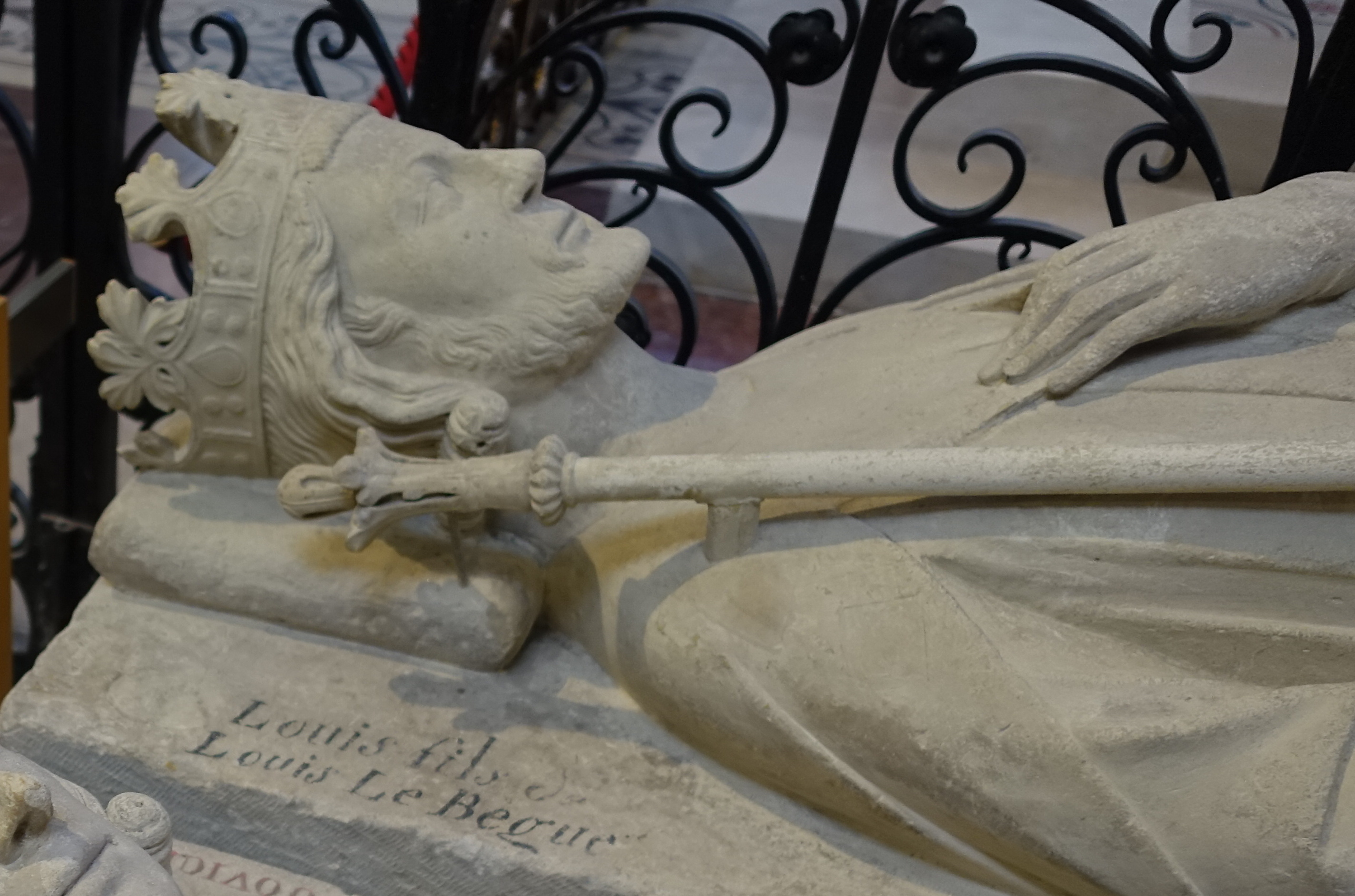
- 1264 gisant of Louis III, Basilica of Saint-Denis

King of West Francia
- Reign: 10 April 879 – 5 August 882
- Coronation: September 879
- Predecessor: Louis the Stammerer
- Successor: Carloman II
- Co-Monarch: Carloman II
- Born: 863/865; St Denis
- Died: 5 August 882 (aged 18–19/16–17); St Denis, Île-de-France, Neustria
- Burial: Basilica of St Denis
- Dynasty: Carolingian
- Father: Louis II
- Mother: Ansgarde of Burgundy

Louis III (863/65 – 5 August 882) was King of West Francia from 879 until his death in 882. Despite questions of his legitimacy and challenges against his ascension to the monarchy, Louis would prove to be an effective leader during his reign, notable for the defeat of Viking invaders at the Battle of Saucourt-en-Vimeu in August 881 that would later be immortalized in the poem Ludwigslied. He also led a less successful military campaign against Boso of Provence with help from Charles the Fat.

The eldest son of Louis the Stammerer and Ansgarde of Burgundy, it was unclear during his early life if the young Louis had a claim on the throne of West Francia. Upon the death of his grandfather and father in 877 and 879 respectively, he ascended to the monarchy, but endured questions of his legitimacy; many refused to recognize him as the "true" King of West Francia and, as a result, he was forced to rule alongside his brother, Carloman II, following a deal in 880 at Amiens to split the throne between Neustria and Aquitania.

During his brief tenure as King, he was challenged by Duke Boso, who had ascended to King of Provence. After his victories in Mâcon and northern Provence, he unsuccessfully besieged Vienne alongside his cousin, Charles the Fat. Invasions from West Frankish rebels and Louis the Younger were peacefully decided after the cession of Western Lotharingia in 880. In August 881, Viking raiders came into Saucourt following defeats in East Francia and the sacking of several cities in West Francia. At the Battle of Saucourt-en-Vimeu, Louis and his brother were able to repel the offensive, killing roughly 9,000 of the invaders. However, the victory proved inconsequential, as Louis died nearly a year later in an accident and was succeeded by his brother. Contemporaries state that Louis was a popular King during his short reign, and describe him as "able and energetic".

== Early life ==
Louis was born in either 863 or 865 at St Denis and was the eldest son of Louis the Stammerer, King of Aquitaine, and his first wife, Ansgarde of Burgundy. Due to the fact that his parents had married secretly and Ansgarde was later repudiated at Charles' insistence, Louis' legitimacy was largely questioned during his early life.

When Charles the Bald died in 877, followed by Louis the Stammerer on 10 April 879, Louis became King of West Francia. Some Frankish nobles advocated keeping Louis as the sole king, but another party favoured each brother ruling a separate part of the kingdom. In September 879, Louis was crowned at Ferrières Abbey.

== Reign ==
A map showing the divisions of the Carolingian Empire in 880. Louis and his brother Carloman divided the rule of West Francia along traditional lines, with Louis controlling Neustria (in dark purple) and Carloman controlling Aquitania (in dark red).

=== Splitting the kingdom ===
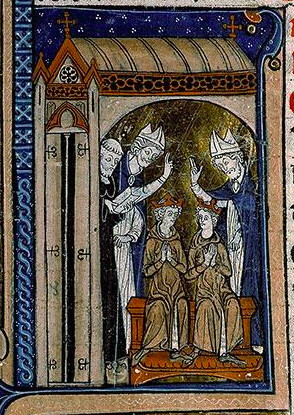
Miniature depicting the crowning of Louis III and his brother Carloman II, c. 1275–1280

=== Early reign; wars against Louis the Younger and Boso (879–880) ===
When Louis III was crowned King of West Francia in September 879, approval was split between allowing Louis to rule alone or have the Kingdom be split. Conflicts began nearly as soon as Louis III was crowned in 879, with dissident nobles and magnates from West Francia led by Louis the Younger, King of East Francia, continuing a campaign that had raged since 877. Ultimately, Carloman II and Louis made an agreement in March 880 at Amiens, dividing their father's kingdom, with Louis receiving Neustria and Carloman receiving Aquitania. As a result of this split, Boso, one of Charles the Bald's most trusted lieutenants and the Count of Vienne, renounced his allegiance to both brothers and appropriated the title of King of Provence. Shortly thereafter, Louis and Carloman made a treaty at Ribemont in 880, giving East Francia the western part of Lotharingia and placating the parties.

Nonetheless, in the summer of 880, Louis and Carloman went to war against Boso. The campaign started well at first, as the brothers captured Mâcon and the northern part of Provence within the first few months of the war. They proceeded to unite their forces with those of their cousin, Charles the Fat, who brought armies from Italy, East Francia, and Alemannia into the war. Despite the added manpower, the siege of Vienne from August to November 880 was unsuccessful and ultimately proved too costly for the war to continue; Louis accepted defeat.

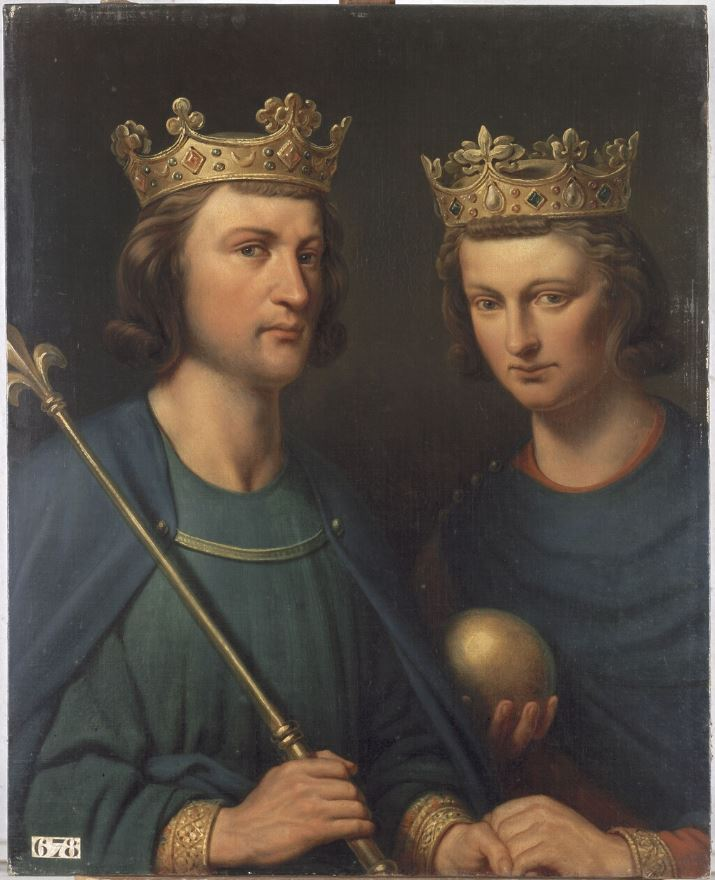
Artistic representation of Louis III & Carloman II, as part of a large collection of commissioned paintings by Louis Philippe I of all the French monarchs. (Charles Auguste Steuben, ca. 1837).

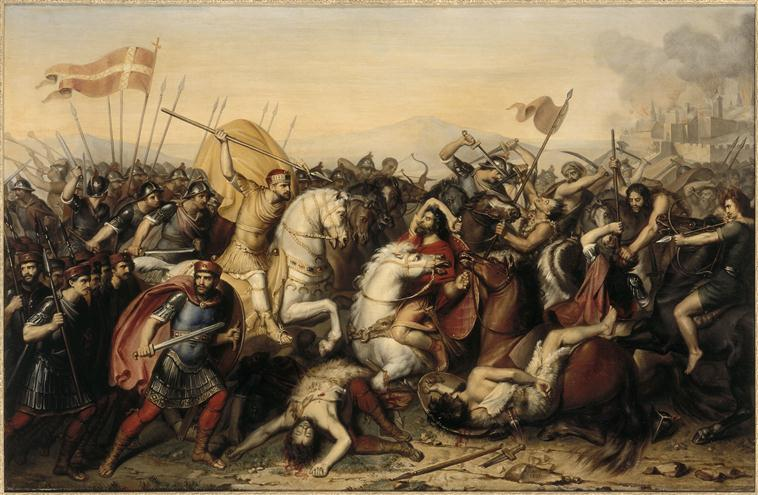
Battle of Saucourt-en-Vimeu, as depicted by Jean-Joseph Dassy

=== Military success against the Vikings (881) ===
The Viking raids against the Frankish kingdoms increased sharply around the middle of 880 and quickly turned into a massive problem. After the Viking defeat at Thimeon in the east, the raiders turned to the west and took a multitude of cities including Kortrijk, Arras, Cambrai, Amiens and Corbie between November 880 and July 881.

Louis and his brother intercepted the Vikings at Saucourt-en-Vimeu on 3 August 881, catching them by surprise. In an extremely violent and bloody ambush, according to the Annales Fuldenses, the West Frankish forces slaughtered as many as 9,000 raiders and won an important, decisive victory.

Louis, at a mere 16 years of age, was widely celebrated by the people of both Frankish kingdoms. In East Francia, the Old High German poem Ludwigslied celebrated Louis' heroism, piety and poise in the battle, while in West Francia, a chanson de geste titled Gormond et Isembart was inspired by the battle and written a few hundred years later.

== Death and legacy ==
Louis died on 5 August 882. According to the Annals of St-Vaast:

because he was a young man, he was pursuing a girl, the daughter of a man called Germund, and when she fled into her father's house, the king seated on his horse pursued for a joke, and bashed his shoulders very hard on the upper part of the doorway and his chest on the saddle of his horse.

He was carried on a litter to the Abbey of Saint Denis, where he died.

Louis' death was very damaging to the West Frankish war against the Vikings, and despite his crucial victory at Saucourt, his brother and successor could not match his level of success and died only two years later in 884. However, his death united the kingdom of West Francia under one ruler and his reign set the stage for later Frankish unity.

== See also ==
- Charles VIII of France, another French king who died after hitting his head on a lintel.
- Carloman II, the successor of Louis III.

== Sources ==
- Bartlett, Robert (2020). Blood Royal: Dynastic Politics in Medieval Europe. Cambridge, UK: Cambridge University Press. ISBN 978-1-108-49067-2.
- Fouracre, Paul. "The Context of the Old High German Ludwigslied", Medium Aevum, 46 (1985), 87–103.
- Gillmor, C.M. (2010). "Saucourt, Battle of". In Rogers, Clifford J. (ed.). The Oxford Encyclopedia of Medieval Warfare and Military Technology. Oxford University Press. pp. 223–224.
- Green, Dennis H. "The Ludwigslied and the Battle of Saucourt", in Judith Jesch (ed.), The Scandinavians from the Vendel Period to the Tenth Century (Oxford: Boydell Press, 2002), 281–302.
- Jackson, Richard A., ed. (1995). Ordines Coronationis Franciae. Vol. 1. University of Pennsylvania Press.
- MacLean, Simon (2001). "The Carolingian response to the revolt of Boso, 879–887". French Historical Studies. 10 (1): 21–48.
- MacLean, Simon (2003). Kingship and Politics in the Late Ninth Century: Charles the Fat and the end of the Carolingian Empire. New York: Cambridge University Press.
- McKitterick, Rosamond (1983). The Frankish Kingdoms Under the Carolingians, 751-987. Harlow: Longman.
- Mueller-Vollmer, Tristan; Wolf, Kirsten, eds. (2022). "Chronology: 881". Vikings: An Encyclopedia of Conflict, Invasions, and Raids. ABC-CLIO.
- Nelson, Janet, ed. (1991). The Annals of St-Bertin. Manchester, UK: Manchester University Press. ISBN 978-0-7190-3426-8.
- Venning, Timothy (2017). A Chronology of Early Medieval Western Europe: 450–1066. Routledge.

Louis III of France Carolingian dynasty Born: 864 Died: 5 August 882
Preceded by Louis II	King of West Francia; 10 April 879 – 5 August 882 with Carloman II	Succeeded by Carloman II
