= February 2 =

February 2 this year in various calendars
- Monday, 2 February 2026
Akan	Kwadwo
Armenian	17 Mehekani 1475
Aztec	Etzalcualiztli 3, 11 Ozomahtli
Babylonian	13 Tebetu, 2336 SE
Balinese pawukon	Menga, Beteng, Jaya, Keliwon, Was, Coma of Uye, Guru, Jangur, Suka
Bengali	19 Magh, BS 1432
Chinese	Yin Fire Goat・Exntended Net Mansion; Wood Snake Year, Month 12, Day 15 (Dahan, 2 days until Lichun)
Common Era	2 February 2026 CE
Coptic	25 Tobi, AM 1742
Egyptian	22 Payni, 2774 NE
Ethiopian	25 Ṭer, 2018 Amätä Məhrät
French Republican	Décade II, Quartidi de Pluviôse de l'Année 234 de la République
Gregorian	2 February, AD 2026
Hebrew	15 Shevat, AM 5786
Hindu	Āśleṣā・Ayuṣmān; Solar: 20 Māgha, 1947 SE; Lunisolar: Pratipada, Kṛishna pakṣa of Māgha, 2082 VE; Siddhārthin・5126 KY・1,872,608
Icelandic	Mánudagur, 11 Þorri 2025
Islamic	14 Sha'aban, AH 1447 (using tabular method)
ISO week date	2026-W06-1
Japanese	15 Shiwasu, Reiwa 8 (Daikan, 2 days until Risshun)
Julian	20 January, AD 2026 (AM 7534)
Julian day	2461074
Korean	15 Sodal, 4358 DE
Maya	13.0.13.5.11; 9 Pax, 11 Chuen
Roman	ante diem XIII Kalendas Februarias, MMDCCLXXIX AUC
Solar Hijri	13 Bahman, SH 1404
Tibetan	16 rgyal, shing mo sbrul 2152 or 1771 or 999

<<	February					>>
Su	Mo	Tu	We	Th	Fr	Sa
1	2	3	4	5	6	7
8	9	10	11	12	13	14
15	16	17	18	19	20	21
22	23	24	25	26	27	28
2026

February 2 in recent years
2026 (Monday)
2025 (Sunday)
2024 (Friday)
2023 (Thursday)
2022 (Wednesday)
2021 (Tuesday)
2020 (Sunday)
2019 (Saturday)
2018 (Friday)
2017 (Thursday)

February 2 is the 33rd day of the year in the Gregorian calendar; 332 days remain until the end of the year (333 in leap years).

== Events ==
=== Pre-1600 ===
- 506 – Alaric II, eighth king of the Visigoths, promulgates the Breviary of Alaric (Breviarium Alaricianum or Lex Romana Visigothorum), a collection of "Roman law".
- 880 – Battle of Lüneburg Heath: King Louis III of France is defeated by the Norse Great Heathen Army at Lüneburg Heath in Saxony.
- 962 – Translatio imperii: Pope John XII crowns Otto I, Holy Roman Emperor, the first Holy Roman Emperor in nearly 40 years.
- 1032 – Conrad II, Holy Roman Emperor becomes king of Burgundy.
- 1141 – The Battle of Lincoln, at which Stephen, King of England is defeated and captured by the allies of Empress Matilda.
- 1207 – Terra Mariana, eventually comprising present-day Latvia and Estonia, is established.
- 1347 – Byzantine Empress Anna convenes a synod to depose patriarch Joseph XIV in Constantinople. The same night, conspirators let in her rival John VI Kantakouzenos which ends the Byzantine civil war of 1341–1347.
- 1428 – An intense earthquake struck the Principality of Catalonia, with the epicenter near Camprodon. Widespread destruction and heavy casualties were reported.
- 1438 – Nine leaders of the Transylvanian peasant revolt are executed at Torda.
- 1461 – Wars of the Roses: The Battle of Mortimer's Cross results in the death of Owen Tudor.
- 1536 – Spaniard Pedro de Mendoza founds Buenos Aires, Argentina.

=== 1601–1900 ===
- 1645 – Wars of the Three Kingdoms: In Scotland, the Battle of Inverlochy results in a Royalist/Irish victory.
- 1653 – New Amsterdam (later renamed The City of New York) is incorporated.
- 1709 – Alexander Selkirk is rescued after being shipwrecked on a desert island, inspiring Daniel Defoe's adventure book Robinson Crusoe.
- 1725 – J. S. Bach leads the first performance of his chorale cantata Mit Fried und Freud ich fahr dahin, BWV 125, based on Luther's paraphrase of the Nunc dimittis.
- 1797 – The siege of Mantua ends after eight months when Count Dagobert Sigmund von Wurmser surrenders the fortress of Mantua to Napoleon Bonaparte. The fall of Mantua secures French control over Northern Italy and marks the beginning of the conclusion of the Italian campaign of 1796-1797, and sets the stage for the end of the War of the First Coalition.
- 1814 – The last of the River Thames frost fairs comes to an end.
- 1848 – Mexican–American War: The Treaty of Guadalupe Hidalgo is signed.
- 1850 – Brigham Young declares war on Timpanogos in the Battle at Fort Utah.
- 1868 – Pro-Imperial forces capture Osaka Castle from the Tokugawa shogunate and burn it to the ground.
- 1870 – The Seven Brothers (Seitsemän veljestä), a novel by Finnish author Aleksis Kivi, is published first time in several thin booklets.
- 1876 – The National League of Professional Baseball Clubs of Major League Baseball is formed.
- 1881 – The sentences of the trial of the warlocks of Chiloé are imparted.
- 1887 – In Punxsutawney, Pennsylvania, the first Groundhog Day is observed.
- 1899 – The Australian Premiers' Conference held in Melbourne decides to locate Australia's capital city, Canberra, between Sydney and Melbourne.

=== 1901–present ===
- 1901 – Funeral of Queen Victoria.
- 1909 – The Paris Film Congress opens, an attempt by European producers to form an equivalent to the MPPC cartel in the United States.
- 1913 – Grand Central Terminal opens in New York City.
- 1920 – The Tartu Peace Treaty is signed between Estonia and Russia.
- 1922 – Ulysses by James Joyce is published.
- 1922 – The uprising called the "pork mutiny" starts in the region between Kuolajärvi and Savukoski in Finland.
- 1925 – Serum run to Nome: Dog sleds reach Nome, Alaska with diphtheria serum, inspiring the Iditarod race.
- 1934 – The Export-Import Bank of the United States is incorporated.
- 1935 – Leonarde Keeler administers polygraph tests to two murder suspects, the first time polygraph evidence was admitted in U.S. courts.
- 1942 – The Osvald Group is responsible for the first, active event of anti-Nazi resistance in Norway, to protest the inauguration of Vidkun Quisling.
- 1943 – World War II: The Battle of Stalingrad comes to an end when Soviet troops accept the surrender of the last organized German troops in the city.
- 1954 – The Detroit Red Wings played in the first outdoor hockey game by any NHL team in an exhibition against the Marquette Branch Prison Pirates in Marquette, Michigan.
- 1959 – Nine experienced ski hikers in the northern Ural Mountains in the Soviet Union die under mysterious circumstances.
- 1966 – Pakistan suggests a six-point agenda with Kashmir after the Indo-Pakistani war of 1965.
- 1971 – Idi Amin replaces President Milton Obote as leader of Uganda.
- 1971 – The international Ramsar Convention for the conservation and sustainable utilization of wetlands is signed in Ramsar, Mazandaran, Iran.
- 1980 – Reports surface that the FBI is targeting allegedly corrupt Congressmen in the Abscam operation.
- 1982 – Hama massacre: The government of Syria attacks the town of Hama.
- 1987 – After the 1986 People Power Revolution, the Philippines enacts a new constitution.
- 1989 – Soviet–Afghan War: The last Soviet armoured column leaves Kabul.
- 1990 – Apartheid: F. W. de Klerk announces the unbanning of the African National Congress and promises to release Nelson Mandela.
- 1998 – Cebu Pacific Flight 387 crashes into Mount Sumagaya in the Philippines, killing all 104 people on board.
- 2000 – First digital cinema projection in Europe (Paris) realized by Philippe Binant with the DLP CINEMA technology developed by Texas Instruments.
- 2004 – Swiss tennis player Roger Federer becomes the No. 1 ranked men's singles player, a position he will hold for a record 237 weeks.
- 2005 – The Government of Canada introduces the Civil Marriage Act. This legislation would become law on July 20, 2005, legalizing same-sex marriage.
- 2007 – Police officer Filippo Raciti is killed when a clash breaks out in the Sicily derby between Catania and Palermo, in the Serie A, the top flight of Italian football. This event led to major changes in stadium regulations in Italy.
- 2012 – The ferry MV Rabaul Queen sinks off the coast of Papua New Guinea near the Finschhafen District, with an estimated 146–165 dead.
- 2021 – The Burmese military establishes the State Administration Council, the military junta, after deposing the democratically elected government in the 2021 Myanmar coup d'état.
- 2025 – Slovenian NBA player Luka Doncic is traded from the Dallas Mavericks to the Los Angeles Lakers in exchange for Anthony Davis in one of the largest trades in American sports history.

== Births ==
=== Pre-1600 ===
- 1208 – James I of Aragon (died 1276)
- 1425 (or 1426) – Eleanor of Navarre, Queen regnant of Navarre (died 1479)
- 1443 – Elisabeth of Bavaria, Electress of Saxony (died 1486)
- 1455 – John, King of Denmark (died 1513)
- 1457 – Peter Martyr d'Anghiera, Italian-Spanish historian and author (died 1526)
- 1467 – Columba of Rieti, Italian Dominican sister (died 1501)
- 1494 – Bona Sforza, queen of Sigismund I of Poland (died 1557)
- 1502 – Damião de Góis, Portuguese philosopher and historian (died 1574)
- 1509 – John of Leiden, Dutch Anabaptist leader (died 1536)
- 1517 – Gotthard Kettler, the last Master of the Livonian Order and the first Duke of Courland and Semigallia (died 1587)
- 1522 – Lodovico Ferrari, Italian mathematician and academic (died 1565)
- 1536 – Piotr Skarga, Polish writer (died 1612)
- 1551 – Nicolaus Reimers, German astronomer (died 1600)
- 1576 – Alix Le Clerc, French Canoness Regular and foundress (died 1622)
- 1585 – Judith Quiney, William Shakespeare's youngest daughter (died 1662)
- 1585 – Hamnet Shakespeare, William Shakespeare's only son (baptised; died 1596)
- 1588 – Georg II of Fleckenstein-Dagstuhl, German nobleman (died 1644)
- 1600 – Gabriel Naudé, French librarian and scholar (died 1653)

=== 1601–1900 ===
- 1611 – Ulrik of Denmark, Danish prince-bishop (died 1633)
- 1613 – Noël Chabanel, French missionary and saint (died 1649)
- 1621 – Johannes Schefferus, Swedish author and hymn-writer (died 1679)
- 1650 – Pope Benedict XIII (died 1730)
- 1650 – Nell Gwyn, English actress, mistress of King Charles II of England (died 1687)
- 1651 – William Phips, Royal governor of the Province of Massachusetts Bay (died 1695)
- 1669 – Louis Marchand, French organist and composer (died 1732)
- 1677 – Jean-Baptiste Morin, French composer (died 1745)
- 1695 – William Borlase, English geologist and archaeologist (died 1772)
- 1695 – François de Chevert, French general (died 1769)
- 1700 – Johann Christoph Gottsched, German author and critic (died 1766)
- 1711 – Wenzel Anton, Prince of Kaunitz-Rietberg (died 1794)
- 1714 – Gottfried August Homilius, German organist and composer (died 1785)
- 1717 – Ernst Gideon von Laudon, Austrian field marshal (died 1790)
- 1754 – Charles Maurice de Talleyrand-Périgord, French politician, Prime Minister of France (died 1838)
- 1782 – Henri de Rigny, French admiral and politician, French Minister of War (died 1835)
- 1786 – Jacques Philippe Marie Binet, French mathematician, physicist, and astronomer (died 1856)
- 1802 – Jean-Baptiste Boussingault, French chemist and academic (died 1887)
- 1803 – Albert Sidney Johnston, American general (died 1862)
- 1829 – Alfred Brehm, German zoologist and illustrator (died 1884)
- 1829 – William Stanley, English engineer and philanthropist (died 1909)
- 1841 – François-Alphonse Forel, Swiss limnologist and hydrologist (died 1912)
- 1842 – Julian Sochocki, Polish-Russian mathematician and academic (died 1927)
- 1849 – Pavol Országh Hviezdoslav, Slovak poet and playwright (died 1921)
- 1851 – José Guadalupe Posada, Mexican illustrator and engraver (died 1913)
- 1856 – Frederick William Vanderbilt, American railway magnate (died 1938)
- 1856 – Makar Yekmalyan, Armenian composer (died 1905)
- 1857 – Jan Drozdowski, Polish pianist and music teacher (died 1918)
- 1860 – Curtis Guild, Jr., American journalist and politician, 43rd Governor of Massachusetts (died 1915)
- 1861 – Solomon R. Guggenheim, American businessman and philanthropist, founded the Solomon R. Guggenheim Museum (died 1949)
- 1862 – Émile Coste, French fencer (died 1927)
- 1862 – Cornelius McKane, American physician, educator, and hospital founder (died 1912)
- 1866 – Enrique Simonet, Spanish painter and academic (died 1927)
- 1869 – Alexander Atabekian, Armenian physician and anarchist publisher (died 1933)
- 1872 – Abul Kasem, Bengali politician (died 1936)
- 1873 – Leo Fall, Austrian composer (died 1925)
- 1873 – Konstantin von Neurath, German politician and diplomat, 13th German Minister of Foreign Affairs (died 1956)
- 1875 – Fritz Kreisler, Austrian-American violinist and composer (died 1962)
- 1877 – Frank L. Packard, Canadian author (died 1942)
- 1878 – Joe Lydon, American boxer (died 1937)
- 1880 – Frederick Lane, Australian swimmer (died 1969)
- 1881 – Orval Overall, American baseball player and manager (died 1947)
- 1882 – Prince Andrew of Greece and Denmark (died 1944)
- 1882 – James Joyce, Irish novelist, short story writer, and poet (died 1941)
- 1883 – Johnston McCulley, American author and screenwriter, created Zorro (died 1958)
- 1883 – Julia Nava de Ruisánchez, Mexican activist and writer (died 1964)
- 1885 – Mikhail Frunze, Soviet revolutionary, politician, army officer and military theorist (died 1925)
- 1886 – William Rose Benét, American poet and author (died 1950)
- 1887 – Ernst Hanfstaengl, German businessman (died 1975)
- 1889 – Jean de Lattre de Tassigny, French general (died 1952)
- 1890 – Charles Correll, American actor and screenwriter (died 1972)
- 1892 – Tochigiyama Moriya, Japanese sumo wrestler, the 27th Yokozuna (died 1959)
- 1893 – Cornelius Lanczos, Hungarian mathematician and physicist (died 1974)
- 1893 – Raoul Riganti, Argentinian race car driver (died 1970)
- 1893 – Damdin Sükhbaatar, Mongolian soldier and politician (died 1924)
- 1895 – George Halas, American football player and coach (died 1983)
- 1895 – Robert Philipp, American painter (died 1981)
- 1895 – George Sutcliffe, Australian public servant (died 1964)
- 1896 – Kazimierz Kuratowski, Polish mathematician and logician (died 1980)
- 1897 – Howard Deering Johnson, American businessman, founded Howard Johnson's (died 1972)
- 1897 – Gertrude Blanch, Russian-American mathematician (died 1996)
- 1900 – Willie Kamm, American baseball player and manager (died 1988)

=== 1901–present ===
- 1901 – Jascha Heifetz, Lithuanian-American violinist and educator (died 1987)
- 1902 – Newbold Morris, American lawyer and politician (died 1966)
- 1902 – John Tonkin, Australian politician, 20th Premier of Western Australia (died 1995)
- 1904 – Bozorg Alavi, Iranian author and activist (died 1997)
- 1905 – Ayn Rand, Russian-born American novelist and philosopher (died 1982)
- 1908 – Wes Ferrell, American baseball player and manager (died 1976)
- 1909 – Frank Albertson, American actor (died 1964)
- 1911 – Jack Pizzey, Australian politician, 29th Premier of Queensland (died 1968)
- 1912 – Millvina Dean, English civil servant and cartographer (died 2009)
- 1912 – Burton Lane, American songwriter and composer (died 1997)
- 1913 – Poul Reichhardt, Danish actor and singer (died 1985)
- 1914 – Eric Kierans, Canadian economist and politician, 1st Canadian Minister of Communications (died 2004)
- 1915 – Abba Eban, South African-Israeli politician and diplomat, 1st Israel Ambassador to the United Nations (died 2002)
- 1915 – Stan Leonard, Canadian golfer (died 2005)
- 1915 – Khushwant Singh, Indian journalist and author (died 2014)
- 1916 – Xuân Diệu, Vietnamese poet and author (died 1985)
- 1917 – Mary Ellis, British World War II ferry pilot (died 2018)
- 1917 – Đỗ Mười, Vietnamese politician, 5th Prime Minister of Vietnam (died 2018)
- 1918 – Hella Haasse, Indonesian-Dutch author (died 2011)
- 1919 – Lisa Della Casa, Swiss soprano and actress (died 2012)
- 1919 – Georg Gawliczek, German footballer and manager (died 1999)
- 1920 – George Hardwick, English footballer and coach (died 2004)
- 1920 – John Russell, American Olympic equestrian (died 2020)
- 1920 – Arthur Willis, English football player-manager (died 1987)
- 1922 – Kunwar Digvijay Singh, Indian field hockey player (died 1978)
- 1922 – Robert Chef d'Hôtel, French athlete (died 2019)
- 1922 – Stoyanka Mutafova, Bulgarian actress (died 2019)
- 1922 – James L. Usry, American politician, first African-American mayor of Atlantic City, New Jersey (died 2002)
- 1923 – Jean Babilée, French dancer and choreographer (died 2014)
- 1923 – James Dickey, American poet and novelist (died 1997)
- 1923 – Svetozar Gligorić, Serbian and Yugoslav chess grandmaster (died 2012)
- 1923 – Bonita Granville, American actress and producer (died 1988)
- 1923 – Red Schoendienst, American baseball player, coach, and manager (died 2018)
- 1923 – Liz Smith, American journalist and author (died 2017)
- 1923 – Clem Windsor, Australian rugby player and surgeon (died 2007)
- 1924 – Sonny Stitt, American saxophonist and composer (died 1982)
- 1924 – Elfi von Dassanowsky, Austrian-American singer, pianist, producer (died 2007)
- 1925 – Elaine Stritch, American actress and singer (died 2014)
- 1926 – Valéry Giscard d'Estaing, French academic and politician, 20th President of France (died 2020)
- 1927 – Stan Getz, American saxophonist (died 1991)
- 1927 – Doris Sams, American baseball player (died 2012)
- 1928 – Ciriaco De Mita, 47th Prime minister of Italy (died 2022)
- 1928 – Gamal Hamdan, Egyptian scholar and geographer (died 1993)
- 1928 – Jay Handlan, American basketball player and engineer (died 2013)
- 1928 – Tommy Harmer, English footballer and youth team coach (died 2007)
- 1929 – Sheila Matthews Allen, American actress and producer (died 2013)
- 1929 – George Band, English engineer and mountaineer (died 2011)
- 1929 – Věra Chytilová, Czech actress, director, and screenwriter (died 2014)
- 1929 – John Henry Holland, American computer scientist and academic (died 2015)
- 1929 – Waldemar Kmentt, Austrian operatic tenor (died 2015)
- 1931 – Les Dawson, English comedian and author (died 1993)
- 1931 – Glynn Edwards, Malaysian-English actor (died 2018)
- 1931 – John Paul Harney, Canadian educator and politician (died 2021)
- 1931 – Dries van Agt, Dutch politician, diplomat and jurist, Prime Minister of the Netherlands (died 2024)
- 1931 – Judith Viorst, American journalist and author
- 1932 – Arthur Lyman, American jazz vibraphone and marimba player (died 2002)
- 1932 – Robert Mandan, American actor (died 2018)
- 1933 – M'el Dowd, American actress and singer (died 2012)
- 1933 – Tony Jay, English-American actor (died 2006)
- 1933 – Orlando "Cachaíto" López, Cuban bassist and composer (died 2009)
- 1933 – Than Shwe, Burmese general and politician, 8th Prime Minister of Burma
- 1934 – Khalil Ullah Khan, Bangladeshi actor (died 2014)
- 1935 – Pete Brown, American golfer (died 2015)
- 1935 – Evgeny Velikhov, Russian physicist and academic (died 2024)
- 1936 – Metin Oktay, Turkish footballer and manager (died 1991)
- 1937 – Don Buford, American baseball player and coach
- 1937 – Eric Arturo Delvalle, Panamanian lawyer and politician, President of Panama (died 2015)
- 1937 – Anthony Haden-Guest, British journalist, poet, and critic
- 1937 – Remak Ramsay, American actor
- 1937 – Tom Smothers, American comedian, actor, and activist (died 2023)
- 1937 – Alexandra Strelchenko, Ukrainian actress and singer (died 2019)
- 1938 – Norman Fowler, English journalist and politician, Secretary of State for Transport
- 1938 – Bo Hopkins, American actor (died 2022)
- 1938 – Gene MacLellan, Canadian singer-songwriter (died 1995)
- 1939 – Jackie Burroughs, English-born Canadian actress (died 2010)
- 1939 – Mary-Dell Chilton, American chemist and inventor and one of the founders of modern plant biotechnology
- 1939 – Dale T. Mortensen, American economist and academic, Nobel Prize laureate (died 2014)
- 1940 – Alan Caddy, English guitarist and producer (died 2000)
- 1940 – Thomas M. Disch, American author and poet (died 2008)
- 1940 – Wayne Fontes, American football player and coach
- 1940 – David Jason, English actor, director, and producer
- 1941 – Terry Biddlecombe, English jockey (died 2014)
- 1941 – Lee Redmond, American woman with the longest fingernails (died 2023)
- 1941 – Cory Wells, American pop-rock singer (died 2015)
- 1942 – Graham Nash, English-American singer-songwriter and guitarist
- 1944 – Andrew Davis, English organist and conductor (died 2024)
- 1944 – Geoffrey Hughes, English actor (died 2012)
- 1944 – Ursula Oppens, American pianist and educator
- 1945 – John Eatwell, Baron Eatwell, English economist and academic
- 1946 – John Armitt, English engineer and businessman
- 1946 – Blake Clark, American comedian and actor
- 1946 – Alpha Oumar Konaré, Malian academic and politician, 3rd President of Mali
- 1946 – Constantine Papadakis, Greek-American businessman and academic (died 2009)
- 1947 – Greg Antonacci, American actor, director, producer, and screenwriter (died 2017)
- 1947 – Farrah Fawcett, American actress and producer (died 2009)
- 1948 – Ina Garten, American chef and author
- 1948 – Al McKay, American guitarist, songwriter, and producer
- 1948 – Roger Williamson, English race car driver (died 1973)
- 1949 – Duncan Bannatyne, Scottish businessman and philanthropist
- 1949 – Jack McGee, American actor
- 1949 – Yasuko Namba, Japanese mountaineer (died 1996)
- 1949 – Brent Spiner, American actor and singer
- 1949 – Ross Valory, American bass player and songwriter
- 1950 – Osamu Kido, Japanese wrestler (died 2023)
- 1950 – Libby Purves, British journalist and author
- 1950 – Bárbara Rey, Spanish singer and actress
- 1950 – Barbara Sukowa, German actress
- 1950 – Genichiro Tenryu, Japanese wrestler
- 1951 – Vangelis Alexandris, Greek basketball player and coach
- 1951 – Ken Bruce, Scottish radio host
- 1952 – Dave Casper, American football player
- 1952 – John Cornyn, American lawyer and politician, 49th Attorney General of Texas
- 1952 – Park Geun-hye, South Korean politician, 11th President of South Korea
- 1952 – Ralph Merkle, American computer scientist and academic
- 1952 – Carol Ann Susi, American actress (died 2014)
- 1953 – Duane Chapman, American bounty hunter
- 1953 – Jerry Sisk, Jr., American gemologist, co-founded Jewelry Television (died 2013)
- 1954 – Christie Brinkley, American actress, model, and businesswoman
- 1954 – Hansi Hinterseer, Austrian skier and actor
- 1954 – Nelson Ne'e, Solomon Islander politician (died 2013)
- 1954 – John Tudor, American baseball player
- 1955 – Leszek Engelking, Polish poet and author (died 2022)
- 1955 – Bob Schreck, American author
- 1955 – Michael Talbott, American actor
- 1955 – Kim Zimmer, American actress
- 1955 – Jean-Michel Dupuis, French actor (died 2024)
- 1956 – Adnan Oktar, Turkish cult leader
- 1957 – Phil Barney, Algerian-French singer-songwriter
- 1958 – Michel Marc Bouchard, Canadian playwright
- 1959 – Dexter Manley, American football player
- 1961 – Abraham Iyambo, Namibian politician (died 2013)
- 1961 – Lauren Lane, American actress and academic
- 1962 – Philippe Claudel, French author, director, and screenwriter
- 1962 – Andy Fordham, English darts player (died 2021)
- 1962 – Luke Johnson, English businessman
- 1962 – Paul Kilgus, American baseball player
- 1962 – Kate Raison, Australian actress
- 1962 – Michael T. Weiss, American actor
- 1963 – Ilya Byakin, Russian ice hockey player
- 1963 – Eva Cassidy, American singer and guitarist (died 1996)
- 1963 – Kjell Dahlin, Swedish ice hockey player
- 1963 – Andrej Kiska, Slovak entrepreneur and philanthropist, President of Slovakia
- 1963 – Philip Laats, Belgian martial artist
- 1963 – Stephen McGann, English actor
- 1963 – Vigleik Storaas, Norwegian pianist
- 1965 – Carl Airey, English footballer
- 1965 – Naoki Sano, Japanese wrestler and mixed martial artist
- 1966 – Andrei Chesnokov, Russian tennis player and coach
- 1966 – Robert DeLeo, American bass player, songwriter, and producer
- 1966 – Adam Ferrara, American actor and comedian
- 1966 – Michael Misick, Caicos Islander politician, Premier of the Turks and Caicos Islands
- 1967 – Artūrs Irbe, Latvian ice hockey player and coach
- 1967 – Laurent Nkunda, Congolese general
- 1968 – Kenny Albert, American sportscaster
- 1968 – Sean Elliott, American basketball player and sportscaster
- 1968 – Scott Erickson, American baseball player and coach
- 1969 – Dana International, Israeli singer-songwriter
- 1969 – Valeri Karpin, Estonian-Russian footballer and manager
- 1970 – Roar Strand, Norwegian footballer
- 1970 – Erik ten Hag, Dutch footballer and manager
- 1970 – Jennifer Westfeldt, American actress and singer
- 1971 – Michelle Gayle, English singer-songwriter and actress
- 1971 – Arly Jover, Spanish actress
- 1971 – Isaac Kungwane, South African footballer and sportscaster (died 2014)
- 1971 – Rockwilder, American rapper and producer
- 1971 – Hwang Seok-jeong, South Korean actress
- 1971 – Jason Taylor, Australian rugby league player and coach
- 1972 – Hisashi, Japanese musician
- 1972 – Melvin Mora, Venezuelan baseball player
- 1972 – Aleksey Naumov, Russian footballer
- 1973 – Andrei Luzgin, Estonian tennis player and coach
- 1973 – Aleksander Tammert, Estonian discus thrower
- 1973 – Marissa Jaret Winokur, American actress and singer
- 1975 – Todd Bertuzzi, Canadian ice hockey player
- 1975 – Donald Driver, American football player
- 1975 – Ieroklis Stoltidis, Greek footballer
- 1976 – Ryan Farquhar, Northern Irish motorcycle racer
- 1976 – James Hickman, English swimmer
- 1976 – Ana Roces, Filipino actress
- 1977 – Shakira, Colombian singer-songwriter, producer, and actress
- 1977 – Libor Sionko, Czech footballer
- 1978 – Adam Christopher, New Zealand writer
- 1978 – Barry Ferguson, Scottish footballer and manager
- 1978 – Dan Gadzuric, Dutch basketball player
- 1978 – Lee Ji-ah, South Korean actress
- 1978 – Rich Sommer, American actor
- 1978 – Faye White, English footballer
- 1979 – Urmo Aava, Estonian race car driver
- 1979 – Fani Chalkia, Greek hurdler and sprinter
- 1979 – Christine Lampard, Irish television host
- 1979 – Shamita Shetty, Indian actress
- 1979 – Irini Terzoglou, Greek shot putter
- 1980 – Teddy Hart, Canadian wrestler
- 1980 – Zhang Jingchu, Chinese actress
- 1980 – Oleguer Presas, Spanish footballer
- 1981 – Lance Allred, American basketball player and activist
- 1981 – Emre Aydın, Turkish singer-songwriter
- 1981 – Michelle Bass, English model and singer
- 1981 – Salem al-Hazmi, Saudi Arabian terrorist, hijacker of American Airlines Flight 77 (died 2001)
- 1982 – Sergio Castaño Ortega, Spanish footballer
- 1982 – Kelly Mazzante, American basketball player
- 1982 – Kan Mi-youn, South Korean singer, model, and host
- 1983 – Ronny Cedeño, Venezuelan baseball player
- 1983 – Carolina Klüft, Swedish heptathlete and jumper
- 1983 – Jordin Tootoo, Canadian ice hockey player
- 1983 – Jason Vargas, American baseball player
- 1983 – Vladimir Voskoboinikov, Estonian footballer
- 1983 – Alex Westaway, English singer-songwriter and guitarist
- 1984 – Brian Cage, American wrestler
- 1984 – Chin-Lung Hu, Taiwanese baseball player
- 1984 – Mao Miyaji, Japanese actress
- 1984 – Rudi Wulf, New Zealand rugby player
- 1985 – Morris Almond, American basketball player
- 1985 – Masoud Azizi, Afghan sprinter
- 1985 – Renn Kiriyama, Japanese actor
- 1985 – Kristo Saage, Estonian basketball player
- 1985 – Silvestre Varela, Portuguese footballer
- 1986 – Gemma Arterton, English actress and singer
- 1986 – Miwa Asao, Japanese volleyball player
- 1987 – Anthony Fainga'a, Australian rugby player
- 1987 – Saia Fainga'a, Australian rugby player
- 1987 – Faydee, Australian singer
- 1987 – Athena Imperial, Filipino journalist, Miss Earth-Water 2011
- 1987 – Mimi Page, American singer-songwriter and composer
- 1987 – Gerard Piqué, Spanish footballer
- 1987 – Javon Ringer, American football player
- 1987 – Jill Scott, English footballer
- 1987 – Martin Spanjers, American actor and producer
- 1988 – JuJu Chan, Hong Kong-American actress, martial artist, singer, and writer
- 1988 – Zosia Mamet, American actress
- 1988 – Brad Peacock, American baseball player
- 1989 – Harrison Smith, American football player
- 1989 – Southside, American record producer
- 1991 – Nathan Delfouneso, English footballer
- 1991 – Gregory Mertens, Belgian footballer (died 2015)
- 1991 – Shohei Nanba, Japanese actor
- 1992 – Lammtarra, American race horse (died 2014)
- 1992 – Joonas Tamm, Estonian footballer
- 1993 – Bobby De Cordova-Reid, English-Jamaican footballer
- 1993 – Ravel Morrison, English footballer
- 1994 – Caterina Bosetti, Italian volleyball player
- 1995 – Paul Digby, English footballer
- 1995 – Aleksander Jagiełło, Polish footballer
- 1995 – Arfa Karim, Pakistani student and computer prodigy (died 2012)
- 1995 – Curtis Lazar, Canadian ice hockey player
- 1995 – Remilia, American professional gamer (died 2019)
- 1996 – Christian Dvorak, American ice hockey player
- 1996 – Paul Mescal, Irish actor
- 1996 – Harry Winks, English footballer
- 1997 – Ellie Bamber, English actress
- 1998 – Shiho Katō, Japanese singer and model
- 1999 – Jeff Okudah, American football player
- 2000 – Munetaka Murakami, Japanese baseball player
- 2001 – Westcol, Colombian online streamer
- 2004 – Eleonore Caburet, French rhythmic gymnast
- 2006 – Lucas Bergvall, Swedish footballer

== Deaths ==
=== Pre-1600 ===
- 619 – Laurence of Canterbury, English archbishop and saint
- 880 – Bruno, duke of Saxony
- 1124 – Bořivoj II, Duke of Bohemia (born 1064)
- 1218 – Konstantin of Rostov (born 1186)
- 1237 – Joan, Lady of Wales
- 1250 – Eric XI of Sweden (born 1216)
- 1294 – Louis II, Duke of Bavaria (born 1229)
- 1347 – Thomas Bek, Bishop of Lincoln, was the bishop of Lincoln (born 1282)
- 1348 – Narymunt, Prince of Pinsk
- 1416 – Racek Kobyla of Dvorce
- 1435 – Joan II of Naples, Queen of Naples (born 1371)
- 1446 – Vittorino da Feltre, Italian humanist (born 1378)
- 1448 – Ibn Hajar al-Asqalani, Egyptian jurist and scholar (born 1372)
- 1461 – Owen Tudor, Welsh founder of the Tudor dynasty (born c. 1400)
- 1512 – Hatuey, Caribbean tribal chief
- 1529 – Baldassare Castiglione, Italian soldier and diplomat (born 1478)
- 1580 – Bessho Nagaharu, Japanese daimyō (born 1558)
- 1594 – Giovanni Pierluigi da Palestrina, Italian composer and educator (born 1525)

=== 1601–1900 ===
- 1648 – George Abbot, English author and politician (born 1603)
- 1660 – Gaston, Duke of Orléans (born 1608)
- 1660 – Govert Flinck, Dutch painter (born 1615)
- 1661 – Lucas Holstenius, German geographer and historian (born 1596)
- 1675 – Ivan Belostenec, Croatian linguist and lexicographer (born 1594)
- 1688 – Abraham Duquesne, French admiral (born 1610)
- 1704 – Guillaume de l'Hôpital, French mathematician and academic (born 1661)
- 1712 – Martin Lister, English physician and geologist (born 1639)
- 1714 – John Sharp, English archbishop (born 1643)
- 1723 – Antonio Maria Valsalva, Italian anatomist and physician (born 1666)
- 1768 – Robert Smith, English mathematician and theorist (born 1689)
- 1769 – Pope Clement XIII (born 1693)
- 1798 – Ferdinand Ashmall, English centenarian, Catholic priest, died in 73rd year of his ministry (born 1695)
- 1802 – Welbore Ellis, 1st Baron Mendip, English politician, Secretary of State for the Colonies (born 1713)
- 1804 – George Walton, American lawyer and politician, Governor of Georgia (born 1749)
- 1831 – Vincenzo Dimech, Maltese sculptor (born 1768)
- 1836 – Letizia Ramolino, Italian noblewoman (born 1750)
- 1861 – Théophane Vénard, French Catholic missionary (born 1829)
- 1881 – Henry Parker, English-Australian politician, 3rd Premier of New South Wales (born 1808)

=== 1901–present ===
- 1904 – Ernest Cashel, American-Canadian criminal (born 1882)
- 1904 – William Collins Whitney, American financier and politician, 31st United States Secretary of the Navy (born 1841)
- 1905 – Henri Germain, French banker and politician, founded Le Crédit Lyonnais (born 1824)
- 1907 – Dmitri Mendeleev, Russian chemist and academic (born 1834)
- 1909 – Carlo Acton, Italian pianist and composer (born 1829)
- 1913 – Gustaf de Laval, Swedish engineer (born 1845)
- 1918 – John L. Sullivan, American boxer (born 1858)
- 1919 – Julius Kuperjanov, Estonian lieutenant (born 1894)
- 1925 – Antti Aarne, Finnish historian and academic (born 1867)
- 1925 – Jaap Eden, Dutch speed skater and cyclist (born 1873)
- 1926 – Vladimir Sukhomlinov, Russian general and politician (born 1848)
- 1932 – Agha Petros, Assyrian general and politician (born 1880)
- 1939 – Amanda McKittrick Ros, Irish author and poet (born 1860)
- 1939 – Bernhard Gregory, Estonian-German chess player (born 1879)
- 1942 – Ado Birk, Estonian lawyer and politician, 3rd Prime Minister of Estonia (born 1883)
- 1942 – Daniil Kharms, Russian poet and playwright (born 1905)
- 1942 – Hugh D. McIntosh, Australian businessman (born 1876)
- 1945 – Alfred Delp, German priest and philosopher (born 1907)
- 1945 – Carl Friedrich Goerdeler, German economist and politician (born 1884)
- 1945 – Johannes Popitz, German lawyer and politician (born 1884)
- 1948 – Thomas W. Lamont, American banker and philanthropist (born 1870)
- 1948 – Bevil Rudd, South African runner and journalist (born 1894)
- 1950 – Constantin Carathéodory, Greek mathematician and academic (born 1873)
- 1952 – Callistratus of Georgia, Georgian patriarch (born 1866)
- 1954 – Hella Wuolijoki, Estonian-Finnish author and politician (born 1886)
- 1956 – Charley Grapewin, American actor (born 1869)
- 1956 – Truxtun Hare, American football player and hammer thrower (born 1878)
- 1956 – Pyotr Konchalovsky, Russian painter (born 1876)
- 1957 – Grigory Landsberg, Russian physicist and academic (born 1890)
- 1962 – Shlomo Hestrin, Canadian-Israeli biochemist and academic (born 1914)
- 1966 – Hacı Ömer Sabancı, Turkish businessman (born 1906)
- 1968 – Tullio Serafin, Italian conductor and director (born 1878)
- 1969 – Boris Karloff, English actor (born 1887)
- 1970 – Lawrence Gray, American actor (born 1898)
- 1970 – Bertrand Russell, English mathematician and philosopher, Nobel Prize laureate (born 1872)
- 1970 – Hannah Ryggen, Norwegian textile artist (born 1894)
- 1972 – Natalie Clifford Barney, American author, poet, and playwright (born 1876)
- 1973 – Hendrik Elias, Belgian academic and politician, 9th Mayor of Ghent (born 1902)
- 1974 – Imre Lakatos, Hungarian-English mathematician and philosopher (born 1922)
- 1975 – Gustave Lanctot, Canadian historian and academic (born 1883)
- 1979 – Jim Burke, Australian cricketer (born 1930)
- 1979 – Sid Vicious, English singer and bass player (born 1957)
- 1980 – William Howard Stein, American biochemist and academic, Nobel Prize laureate (born 1911)
- 1982 – Paul Desruisseaux, Canadian lawyer and politician (born 1905)
- 1983 – Sam Chatmon, American singer and guitarist (born 1897)
- 1986 – Anita Cobby, Australian murder victim (born 1959)
- 1986 – Gino Hernandez, American wrestler (born 1957)
- 1987 – Carlos José Castilho, Brazilian footballer and manager (born 1927)
- 1987 – Alistair MacLean, Scottish novelist and screenwriter (born 1922)
- 1988 – Marcel Bozzuffi, French actor, director, and screenwriter (born 1929)
- 1989 – Ondrej Nepela, Slovak figure skater and coach (born 1951)
- 1989 – Arnold Nordmeyer, New Zealand minister and politician, 30th New Zealand Minister of Finance (born 1901)
- 1990 – Paul Ariste, Estonian linguist and academic (born 1905)
- 1990 – Joe Erskine, Welsh boxer (born 1934)
- 1992 – Bert Parks, American actor, singer, television personality; Miss America telecast presenter (born 1914)
- 1993 – François Reichenbach, French director and screenwriter (born 1921)
- 1994 – Marija Gimbutas, Lithuanian-American archeologist (born 1921)
- 1995 – Thomas Hayward, American tenor and actor (born 1917)
- 1995 – Fred Perry, English tennis player (born 1909)
- 1995 – Donald Pleasence, English-French actor (born 1919)
- 1996 – Gene Kelly, American actor, singer, dancer, and director (born 1912)
- 1997 – Erich Eliskases, Austrian chess player (born 1913)
- 1997 – Sanford Meisner, American actor and coach (born 1904)
- 1998 – Haroun Tazieff, German-French geologist and cinematographer (born 1914)
- 1999 – David McComb, Australian singer-songwriter and guitarist (born 1962)
- 2002 – Paul Baloff, American singer-songwriter (born 1960)
- 2002 – Claude Brown, American author (born 1937)
- 2003 – Lou Harrison, American composer and educator (born 1917)
- 2004 – Bernard McEveety, American director and producer (born 1924)
- 2005 – Birgitte Federspiel, Danish actress (born 1925)
- 2005 – Max Schmeling, German boxer (born 1905)
- 2007 – Vijay Arora, Indian actor (born 1944)
- 2007 – Billy Henderson, American singer (born 1939)
- 2007 – Joe Hunter, American pianist (born 1927)
- 2007 – Filippo Raciti, Italian police officer (born 1967)
- 2007 – Eric Von Schmidt, American singer-songwriter and guitarist (born 1931)
- 2007 – Masao Takemoto, Japanese gymnast (born 1919)
- 2008 – Barry Morse, Canadian actor, director, and screenwriter (born 1918)
- 2008 – Katoucha Niane, Guinean model and author (born 1960)
- 2011 – Edward Amy, Canadian general (born 1918)
- 2011 – Defne Joy Foster, Turkish actress (born 1975)
- 2011 – Margaret John, Welsh actress (born 1926)
- 2012 – Joyce Barkhouse, Canadian author (born 1913)
- 2012 – Frederick William Danker, American lexicographer and scholar (born 1920)
- 2012 – George Esper, American journalist and academic (born 1932)
- 2012 – Dorothy Gilman, American author (born 1923)
- 2012 – James F. Lloyd, American pilot and politician (born 1922)
- 2013 – Abraham Iyambo, Namibian politician (born 1961)
- 2013 – John Kerr, American actor and lawyer (born 1931)
- 2013 – Chris Kyle, American soldier and sniper (born 1974)
- 2013 – Lino Oviedo, Paraguayan general and politician (born 1943)
- 2013 – Pepper Paire, American baseball player (born 1924)
- 2013 – P. Shanmugam, Indian politician, 13th Chief Minister of Puducherry (born 1927)
- 2013 – Walt Sweeney, American football player (born 1941)
- 2013 – Guy F. Tozzoli, American architect (born 1922)
- 2014 – Gerd Albrecht, German conductor (born 1935)
- 2014 – Tommy Aquino, American motorcycle racer (born 1992)
- 2014 – Nicholas Brooks, English historian (born 1941)
- 2014 – Eduardo Coutinho, Brazilian actor, director, producer, and screenwriter (born 1933)
- 2014 – Philip Seymour Hoffman, American actor, director, and producer (born 1967)
- 2014 – Luis Raúl, Puerto Rican comedian and actor (born 1962)
- 2014 – Bunny Rugs, Jamaican singer (born 1948)
- 2014 – Nigel Walker, English footballer (born 1959)
- 2015 – Joseph Alfidi, American pianist, composer, and conductor (born 1949)
- 2015 – Dave Bergman, American baseball player (born 1953)
- 2015 – Andriy Kuzmenko, Ukrainian singer-songwriter and actor (born 1968)
- 2015 – Molade Okoya-Thomas, Nigerian businessman and philanthropist (born 1935)
- 2015 – Stewart Stern, American screenwriter (born 1922)
- 2015 – The Jacka, American rapper and producer (born 1977)
- 2016 – Bob Elliott, American comedian, actor, and screenwriter (born 1923)
- 2020 – Bernard Ebbers, Canadian businessman, the co-founder and CEO of WorldCom (born 1941)
- 2020 – Mad Mike Hoare, British-Irish military officer and mercenary (born 1919)
- 2021 – Captain Sir Tom Moore, British Army officer and charity campaigner (born 1920)
- 2023 – K. Viswanath, Indian actor, director and screenwriter (born 1930)
- 2023 – Butch Miles, American jazz drummer (born 1944)
- 2024 – Don Murray, American actor (born 1929)
- 2024 – Carl Weathers, American football player and actor (born 1948)
- 2025 – Brian Murphy, English comic actor (born 1932)

== Holidays and observances ==
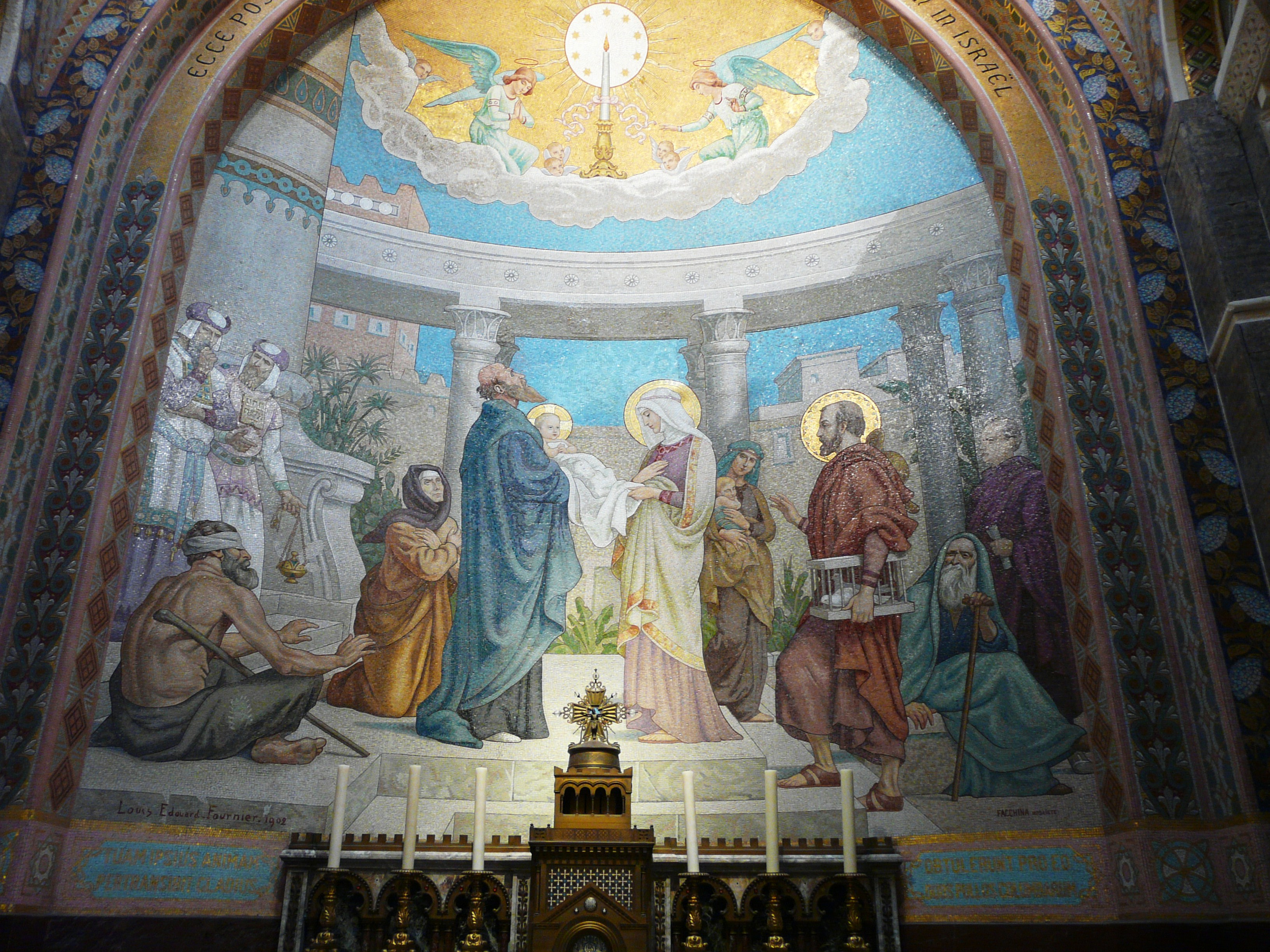
Mosaic of the Presentation of Jesus at the Temple

- Groundhog Day
- Anniversary of Treaty of Tartu (Estonia)
- Christian Feast Day:
  - Adalbard
  - Catherine de' Ricci
  - Jeanne de Lestonnac
  - Martyrs of Ebsdorf
  - Presentation of Jesus
  - February 2 (Eastern Orthodox liturgics)
- Feast of the Presentation of Jesus at the Temple or Candlemas (Western Christianity), and its related observances:
  - A quarter day in the Christian liturgical calendar (due to Candlemas). (Scotland)
  - Celebration of Yemanja or Our Lady of Navigators (Candomblé)
  - Chandeleur (France)
  - Liichtmëssdag (Luxembourg)
  - Our Lady of the Candles (Filipino Catholics)
  - Virgin of Candelaria (Tenerife, Spain)
- Victory of the Battle of Stalingrad (Russia)
- World Wetlands Day
