= Plakhino =

Plakhino (Russian: Плахино) is the name of several rural localities in Russia:

- Plakhino, Zakharovsky District of Ryazan Oblast, a selo Zakharovsky District of Ryazan Oblast
- Plakhino, Kholmogorsky District, Arkhangelsk Oblast, a village in Khavrogorskoye Rural Settlement of Kholmogorsky District, Arkhangelsk Oblast
