= Strelchenko =

Strelchenko (Ukrainian: Стрельченко) is a surname. Notable people with the surname include:

- Alexandra Strelchenko (1937–2019), Ukrainian actress and singer
- Natalia Strelchenko (1976–2015), Norwegian pianist
- Vladimir Strelchenko (born 1964), Russian politician
