= Zakharovsky District =

Zakharovsky District Захаровский район (Russian)
- District
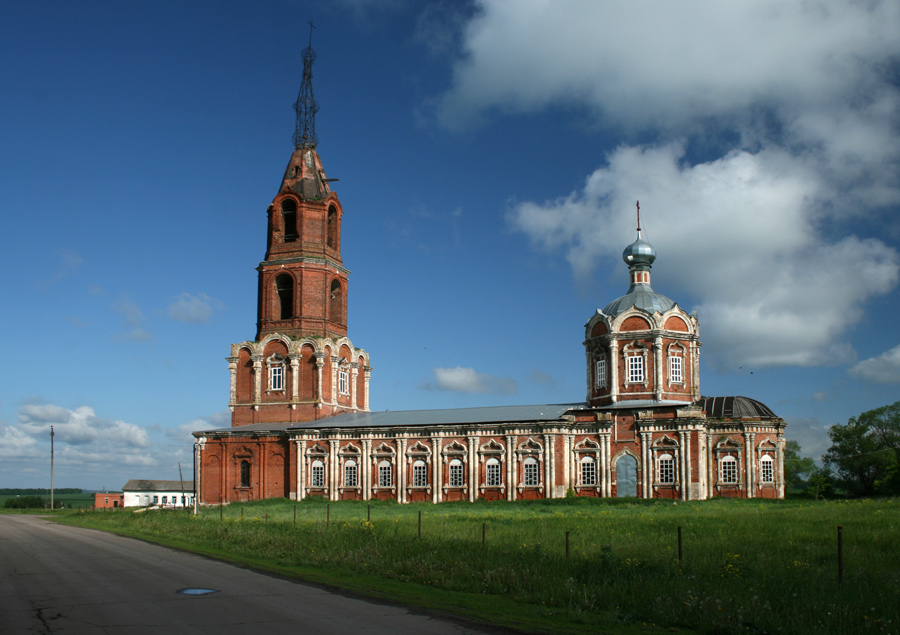
- Church of St. John Bogoslova, Zakharovsky District

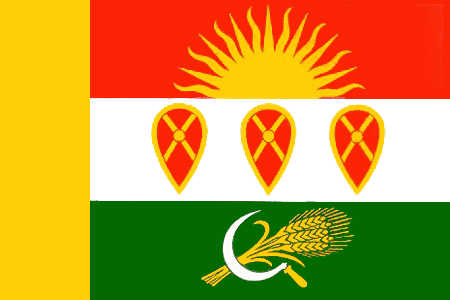
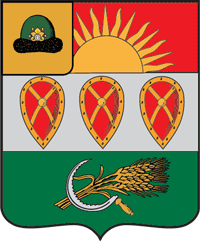
- Flag Coat of arms
- Location of Zakharovsky District in Ryazan Oblast
- Coordinates: 54°21′59″N 39°16′45″E
- Country: Russia
- Federal subject: Ryazan Oblast
- Established: 12 July 1929
- Administrative center: Zakharovo

Area
  - Total: 985.9 km^{2} (380.7 sq mi)

Population (2010 Census)
  - Total: 9,136
  - Density: 9.267/km^{2} (24.00/sq mi)
  - Urban: 0%
  - Rural: 100%

Administrative structure
  - Administrative divisions: 14 rural okrug
  - Inhabited localities: 65 rural localities

Municipal structure
  - Municipally incorporated as: Zakharovsky Municipal District
  - Municipal divisions: 0 urban settlements, 7 rural settlements
- Time zone: UTC+3 (MSK)
- OKTMO ID: 61604000
- Website: http://admzaharovo.ru/

Zakharovsky District (Russian: Заха́ровский райо́н) is an administrative and municipal district (raion), one of the twenty-five in Ryazan Oblast, Russia. It is located in the west of the oblast. The area of the district is 985.9 square kilometers (380.7 sq mi). Its administrative center is the rural locality (a selo) of Zakharovo. Population: 9,136 (2010 Census); 10,607 (2002 census); 11,205 (1989 Soviet census). The population of Zakharovo accounts for 30.0% of the district's total population.

== Notable residents ==
- Alexander Vasilyevich Alexandrov (1883–1946), composer of the national anthem, born in the village of Plakhino
- Boris Donskoy (1894–1918), revolutionary, born in the village of Gladkie Vyselki
