= State Anthem of Transnistria =

My slavim tebja, Pridnestrovje
English: We Praise You, Transnistria
- Мы славим тебя, Приднестровье
- Emblem of Transnistria
- National anthem of Transnistria
- Also known as: «Слэвитэ сэ фий, Нистрения» „Slăvită să fii, Nistrenia“ «Ми славимо тебе, Придністров'я» „My slavymo tebe, Prydnistrovja“
- Lyrics: Boris Parmenov; Nicholas Bozhko; Vitaly Pishenko
- Music: Boris Alexandrovich Alexandrov, 1943
- Adopted: 18 July 2000

Audio sample
- Official orchestral instrumental recording in F major (one verse and chorus twice): file; help

Different official orchestral instrumental recording (one verse and chorus twice)

The State Anthem of the Pridnestrovian Moldavian Republic, (Note: Russian: Государственный гимн Приднестровской Молдавской Республики, romanized: Gosudarstvennyj gimn Pridnestrovskoj Moldavskoj Respubliki) also known by its text "We Praise You, Transnistria" (Note: Romanian: Слэвитэ сэ фий, Нистрения, romanized: Slăvită să fii, Nistrenia; Russian: Мы славим тебя, Приднестровье, romanized: My slavim tebja, Pridnestrovje; Ukrainian: Ми славимо тебе, Придністров'я, romanized: My slavymo tebe, Prydnistrovja) or Russian incipit "We Sing the Praises of Transnistria", (Note: Russian: Мы славу поём Приднестровью, romanized: My slávu poyóm Pridnestróviu) was written by Boris Parmenov, Nicholas Bozhko and Vitaly Pishchenko, and composed by Boris Alexandrovich Alexandrov. The anthem has lyrics in all three official languages of Transnistria: Russian, "Moldovan" (Romanian), and Ukrainian. They are, however, not all literal translations of one another. The origin of the anthem was from the Russian patriotic song "Long Live Our State", a 1943 composition that was one of the proposed songs to be the State Anthem of the Soviet Union. Boris Alexandrov's composition was, however, rejected in favor of the one submitted by his father, Alexander Alexandrov.

== Law ==
The Transnistrian anthem was created with the music of Boris Alexandrovich Alexandrov, and the words of Boris Parmenov, Nicholas Bozhko and Vitaly Pishchenko.

According to law, it must be performed in accordance with the approved musical version and text; other musical editions and translations of it are not considered to be the national anthem of Transnistria.

According to law, the national anthem must be played:

- after the President of the Transnistria takes the oath of office;
- at the opening of the first meeting after the recess and the closing of the last meeting of each session of the Supreme Council;
- during the official flag lifting ceremony;
- every day at the beginning and at the end of the broadcast of television and radio programs on state television and radio;
- during the meeting and sending-off ceremony of persons (delegations) of foreign states visiting the state authorities of Transnistria on an official visit. The national anthem of the Transnistria is performed after the anthem of the corresponding state is performed.

The national anthem may be performed:

- during the opening and closing of solemn meetings dedicated to holidays and significant dates of the republic;
- during the opening of monuments and memorials of national significance;
- during other solemn and protocol events held by state and administrative bodies, local self-government, enterprises, institutions, organizations and individuals.

The national anthem may be sung during state sports competitions.

During the public performance of the anthem, those present listen to it standing up, and men take off their hats, and if the flag of Transnistria is rising as the same time, then anybody present has to turn to face the flag.

It is allowed to use variants of the musical presentation of the anthem in different instrumentation and arrangements.

The national anthem is broadcast by the state audio and audiovisual mass media, the founders of which are the president of the republic and the Supreme Council:

- daily – before the start and after the end of broadcasting, and with round–the-clock broadcasting – at 6 o'clock and at 24 o'clock;
- on New Year's Eve – after the broadcast of the battle of the clock at 24 o'clock.

The anthem can be sung in Romanian, Russian or Ukrainian.

== Lyrics ==
=== Romanian version ===
2014 official orchestral and choral vocal recording (Romanian version)

Cyrillic script

Трэяскэ Нистрения-мамэ,
О царэ де фраць ши сурорь,
Че драгосте фэрэ де сямэ
Ць-о дэруе фийче, фечорь.

Кынта-вом ливезь ши узине,
Ораше, кэтуне, кымпий,
Ку еле – ши'н зиуа де мыне
О, царэ, просперэ не фий!

Рефрен:
Прин време пурта-вом
Нумеле мындрей цэрь.
Ту, Република либертэций,
Ешть крезул ын пашниче зэрь.

Кынта-вом ши вэй, ши колине,
Лучеферь дин Ниструл кэрунт,
Баладе'нцелепте, бэтрыне,
Че'н вякурь дестойничь не-ау врут.

Слэви-вом ероикул нуме,
'Н ачя бэтэлие кэзут
Ши'н фаца меморией сфинте
Ной цэрий журэм сэ-й фим скут!

𝄆 Рефрен 𝄇

Latin script

Trăiască Nistrenia-mamă,
O țară de frați și surori,
Ce dragoste fără de seamă
Ți-o dăruie fiice, feciori.

Cânta-vom livezi și uzine,
Orașe, cătune, câmpii,
Cu ele – și-n ziua de mâine
O, țară, prosperă ne fii!

Refren:
Prin vreme purta-vom
Numele mândrei țări.
Tu, Republica libertății,
Ești crezul în pașnice zări.

Cânta-vom și văi, și coline,
Luceferi din Nistrul cărunt,
Balade-nțelepte, bătrâne,
Ce-n veacuri destoinici ne-au vrut.

Slăvi-vom eroicul nume,
'N acea bătălie căzut
Și-n fața memoriei sfinte
Noi țării jurăm să-i fim scut!

𝄆 Refren 𝄇

IPA transcription (Note: See Help:IPA/Romanian and Romanian phonology.)

[trəˈjas.kə nisˈtre.ni.ja‿ˈma.mə |]
[o ˈtsa.rə de ˈfratsʲ ʃi suˈrorʲ |]
[tʃe ˈdra.gos.te ˈfə.rə de ˈse̯a.mə]
[tsʲ‿o ˈdə.ru.je ˈfij.tʃe feˈtʃorʲ ‖]

[kɨnˈta‿vom liˈvezʲ ʃi uˈzi.ne |]
[oˈra.ʃe kəˈtu.ne kɨmˈpij |]
[ku ˈje.le ʃi‿n ˈzi.wa de ˈmɨ.ne]
[o ˈtsa.rə prosˈpe.rə ne ˈfij ‖]

[reˈfren]
[prin ˈvre.me purˈta.vom |]
[ˈnu.me.le ˈmɨn.drej ˈtsərʲ ‖]
[tu reˈpub.li.ka li.berˈtə.tsij |]
[jeʃtʲ ˈkre.zul ɨn ˈpaʃ.ni.tʃe ˈzərʲ ‖]

[kɨnˈta‿vom ʃi ˈvəj ʃi koˈli.ne |]
[luˈtʃe.ferʲ din ˈnis.trul kəˈrunt |]
[baˈla.de‿n.tseˈlep.te bəˈtrɨ.ne |]
[tʃe‿n ˈve̯a.kurʲ desˈtoj.nitʃʲ ne̯aw ˈvrut ‖]

[sləˈvi.vom eˈro.i.kul ˈnu.me |]
[n‿aˈtʃe̯a bə.təˈli.je kəˈzut |]
[ʃi‿n ˈfa.tsa meˈmo.ri.jej ˈsfin.te |]
[noj ˈtsə.rij ʒuˈrəm sə‿j fim ˈskut ‖]

𝄆 [reˈfren] 𝄇

=== Russian version ===
Official orchestral and choral vocal recordings (Russian version)
2014 official recording

Older official recording

Cyrillic script

Мы славу поём Приднестровью,
Здесь дружба народов крепка,
Великой сыновней любовью
Мы спаяны с ним на века.

Восславим сады и заводы,
Посёлки, поля, города
В них долгие славные годы
На благо Отчизны труда.

Припев:
Пронесём через годы
Имя гордой страны
И Республике свободы
Как правде, мы будем верны.

Мы славим родные долины,
Седого Днестра берега.
О подвигах помним былинных,
Нам слава отцов дорога.

Восславим мы всех поименно,
Погибших за наш отчий дом.
Пред памятью павших священной
Отечеству клятву даём.

𝄆 Припев 𝄇

Romanization of Russian

My slávu poyóm Pridnestróviu,
Zdeś drúzhba naródov krepká,
Velíkoy synóvney lyubóviu
My spáyany s nim na veká.

Vosslávim sadý i zavódy,
Posyólki, polyá, gorodá
V nikh dólgiye slávnyye gódy
Na blágo Otchízny trudá.

Pripév:
Pronesyóm chérez gódy
Ímya górdoy straný
I Respúblike svobódy
Kak právde, my búdem verný.

My slávim rodnýye dolíny,
Sedógo Dnestrá beregá.
O pódvigakh pómnim bylínnykh,
Nam sláva otcóv dorogá.

Vosslávim my vsekh poiménno,
Pogíbshikh za nash ótchiy dom.
Pred pámyatiu pavshíkh svyashchénnoy
Otéchestvu klyátvu dayóm.

𝄆 Pripév 𝄇

IPA transcription as sung (Note: See Help:IPA/Russian and Russian phonology.)

[mɨ ˈsɫa.vu pɐˈjɵm prʲɪ.dʲnʲɪˈstro.v⁽ʲ⁾ju |]
[zʲdʲɛzʲ‿ˈdru.ʐbɐ nɐˈro.dɐf krʲɪpˈka |]
[vʲɛˈlʲi.kɐj sɨˈno.vnʲɛj lʲʊˈbo.v⁽ʲ⁾ju]
[mɨ ˈspa.jɐ.nɨ s‿nʲim nɐ‿vʲɪˈka ǁ]

[vɐsˈsɫa.vʲɪm sɐˈdɨ i zɐˈvo.dɨ |]
[pɐˈsʲɵɫ.kʲi pɐˈlʲa ɡɐ.rɐˈda]
[v‿nʲiɣ‿ˈdoɫ.ɡʲi.jɛ ˈsɫa.vnɨ.jɛ ˈɡo.dɨ]
[nɐ‿ˈbɫa.ɡɐ ɐtˈtɕi.znɨ trʊˈda ǁ]

[prʲɪˈpʲɛf]:
[prɐ.nʲɪˈsʲɵm ˈtɕɛ.rʲɛz‿ˈɡo.dɨ]
[ˈi.mʲɐ ˈɡor.dɐj strɐˈnɨ]
[i rʲɪˈspu.blʲi.kʲɛ svɐˈbo.dɨ]
[kak ˈpra.vdʲɛ mɨ ˈbu.dʲɛm vʲɪrˈnɨ ǁ]

[mɨ ˈsɫa.vʲɪm rɐˈdnɨ.jɛ dɐˈlʲi.nɨ |]
[sʲɛˈdo.vɐ dʲnʲɪˈstra bʲɛ.rʲɪˈɡa ǁ]
[ɐ‿ˈpo.dvʲi.ɡɐx ˈpom.nʲɪm bɨˈlʲin.nɨx |]
[nam ˈsɫa.vɐ ɐtˈtsov‿dɐ.rɐˈɡa ǁ]

[vɐsˈsɫa.vʲɪm mɨ fsʲɛx pɐ.iˈmʲɛn.nɐ |]
[pɐˈɡʲi.pʂɨɣ‿zɐ‿naʂ ˈot.tɕɪj dom ǁ]
[prʲɛt ˈpa.mʲɐ.tʲjʊ ˈpa.fʂɨx svʲɛˈɕːɛ.nːɐj]
[ɐˈtʲɛ.tɕɛst.vʊ ˈklʲat.vʊ dɐˈjɵm ǁ]

𝄆 [prʲɪˈpʲɛf] 𝄇

=== Ukrainian version ===
2014 official orchestral and choral vocal recording (Ukrainian version)

Cyrillic script

Ми славимо край Придністров'я,
Де люди пишаються тим,
Що дружбою, ладом, любов'ю
Навіки пов'язані з ним.

Прославимо наші заводи,
Широкі лани і міста,
Тут чесно працюють народи
На благо Вітчизни труда.

Приспів:
Через доли і води
Пронесемо ім'я
Ми Республіки свободи,
Хай живе тут народів сім'я.

Ми славимо рідні долини,
Красоти Дністра берегів,
І нам не забути билини
Про подвиги наших батьків.

Прославимо всіх поіменно
Полеглих за наш отчий дім,
Де пам'ять загиблих священна,
Вітчизні співаємо гімн.

𝄆 Приспів 𝄇

Latin script

My slávymo krai Prydnistróvya,
De liúdy pysháiuťsia tym,
Shcho drúzhboiu, ládom, liubóvyu
Navíky povyázani z nym.

Proslávymo náshi zavódy,
Shyróki laný i mistá,
Tut chésno praciúiuť naródy
Na bláho Vitchýzny trudá.

Prýspiv:
Chérez dóly i vódy
Pronesémo imyá
My Respúbliky svobódy,
Khai zhyvé tut naródiv simyá.

My slávymo rídni dolýny,
Krasóty Dnistrá berehív,
I nam ne zabúti bylýny
Pro pódvyhy náshykh baťkív.

Proslávymo vsikh poiménno
Poléhlych za nash ótchyi dim,
De pámyať zahíblych sviashchénna,
Vitchýzni spiváiemo himn.

𝄆 Prýspiv 𝄇

IPA transcription (Note: See Help:IPA/Ukrainian and Ukrainian phonology.)

[mɪ ˈsɫɑ.ʋɪ.mo ˈkrɑj prɪ.d⁽ʲ⁾n⁽ʲ⁾i.ˈstrɔ.ʋjɐ |]
[dɛ ˈlʲu.dɪ pɪ.ˈʃɑ.jʊt.t͡sʲɐ ˈtɪm |]
[ʃt͡ʃɔ ˈdruʒ.bo.jʊ | ˈɫɑ.dom | lʲʊ.ˈbɔ.ʋjʊ]
[nɐ.ˈʋ⁽ʲ⁾i.kɪ po.ˈʋjɑ.zɐ.n⁽ʲ⁾i ˈz‿nɪm ǁ]

[pro.ˈsɫɑ.ʋɪ.mo ˈnɑ.ʃ⁽ʲ⁾i zɐ.ˈwɔ.dɪ |]
[ʃɪ.ˈrɔ.k⁽ʲ⁾i ɫɐ.ˈnɪ i m⁽ʲ⁾i.ˈstɑ |]
[tut ˈt͡ʃɛs.no prɐ.ˈt͡sʲu.jʊtʲ nɐ.ˈrɔ.dɪ]
[nɑ ˈbɫɑ.ɦo ʋ⁽ʲ⁾it.ˈt͡ʃɪz.nɪ trʊ.ˈdɑ ǁ]

[ˈprɪs⁽ʲ⁾.p⁽ʲ⁾iu̯]
[ˈt͡ʃɛ.rez ˈdɔ.ɫɪ i ˈwɔ.dɪ]
[pro.ne.ˈsɛ.mo i.ˈmjɑ]
[mɪ res.ˈpub.l⁽ʲ⁾i.kɪ swo.ˈbɔ.dɪ]
[xɑj ʒɪ.ˈʋɛ tut nɐ.ˈrɔ.d⁽ʲ⁾iu̯ s⁽ʲ⁾iˈmjɑ]

[mɪ ˈsɫɑ.ʋɪ.mo ˈr⁽ʲ⁾id⁽ʲ⁾.n⁽ʲ⁾i do.ˈɫɪ.nɪ |]
[krɐ.ˈsɔ.tɪ d⁽ʲ⁾n⁽ʲ⁾i.ˈstrɑ be.re.ˈɦ⁽ʲ⁾iu̯ |]
[i ˈnɑm nɛ zɐ.ˈbu.tɪ bɪ.ˈɫɪ.nɪ]
[pro ˈpɔd.ʋɪ.ɦɪ ˈnɑ.ʃɪx bɐtʲ.ˈk⁽ʲ⁾iu̯ ǁ]

[pro.ˈsɫɑ.ʋɪ.mo ˈu̯s⁽ʲ⁾ix po.i.ˈmɛn.no]
[po.ˈɫɛɦ.ɫɪx zɐ ˈnɑʃ ˈɔt.t͡ʃɪj ˈd⁽ʲ⁾im |]
[dɛ ˈpɑ.mjɐtʲ zɐ.ˈɦɪb.ɫɪx sʲʋʲɐʃ.ˈt͡ʃɛn.nɐ |]
[ʋ⁽ʲ⁾it.ˈt͡ʃɪz⁽ʲ⁾.n⁽ʲ⁾i s⁽ʲ⁾p⁽ʲ⁾i.ˈʋɑ.je.mo ˈɦ⁽ʲ⁾imn ǁ]

𝄆 [ˈprɪs⁽ʲ⁾.p⁽ʲ⁾iu̯] 𝄇

=== Translations into English ===
Since Transnistria has three official languages, the anthem has official lyrics in Romanian, Russian and Ukrainian; however, they are not all literal translations of one another and all have different semantic meanings. The translations are represented below:

Literal translation from Romanian

Long live Mother Transnistria,
A country of brothers and sisters.
Such an immense love thou givest
To thy daughters, thy sons.

We chant about orchards, factories,
Cities, hamlets, and fields.
With them – and tomorrow,
O country, let us prosper!

Refrain:
Through aeons we shall carry
The proud name of our country.
Thou, Republic of liberty –
Thou art the creed in peaceful horizons.

We chant about valleys and hills,
The stars of the ancient Dniester,
And the wise old ballads
Wanting us to be worthy for centuries.

We shall glorify the heroic names
Of those that died in battle.
And in the face of holy memory
We swear to safeguard our country!

𝄆 Refrain 𝄇

Literal translation from Russian

We sing the praises of Transnistria,
Where the friendship of nations is strong,
With great filial love
Forever to it we are bound.

Let us glorify the gardens and factories,
The villages, fields, and cities,
Where for long and glorious years
We've toiled for the sake of the Fatherland.

Refrain:
Through years we shall carry
The name of our proud country.
And to the Republic of freedom,
As to justice, faithful we shall be.

We shall glorify our native valleys,
The banks of the ancient Dniester.
We remember the heroic deeds of the past,
The glory of our fathers is to us dear.

We shall praise each and everyone by name,
Those who perished for our homeland.
Before the sacred memory of the fallen,
We pledge our oath to the Fatherland.

𝄆 Refrain 𝄇

Literal translation from Ukrainian

We glorify the land of Transnistria,
Where people are proud of her.
With which friendship, order, love
Are forever connected.

Let's glorify our factories,
Wide fields and cities,
Here people toil sincerely
For the benefit of the Fatherland.

Refrain:
Through the valleys and waters
We shall carry our proud name.
We are the Republic of freedom.
Long live the family of nations here.

We glorify our native valleys,
The beauty of the Dniester banks,
And we will not forget the epics
About the deeds of our fathers.

Let us glorify all by name
Those who fell for our fatherland,
Where the memory of the dead is sacred,
We sing the anthem of the Fatherland.

𝄆 Refrain 𝄇

=== Trilingual version ===
Orchestral and choral vocal audio (trilingual version)

On official TV broadcasts, a trilingual version is used consisting of the first verse and chorus in Russian, the second verse and chorus in Romanian, the first verse and chorus in Ukrainian and the final repeat of the chorus in Russian.

Cyrillic script

I (на русском)
Мы славу поём Приднестровью,
Здесь дружба народов крепка,
Великой сыновней любовью
Мы спаяны с ним на века.

Восславим сады и заводы,
Посёлки, поля, города
В них долгие славные годы
На благо Отчизны труда.

Припев:
Пронесём через годы
Имя гордой страны
И Республике свободы
Как правде, мы будем верны.

II (ын ромынэ)
Кынта-вом ши вэй, ши колине,
Лучеферь дин Ниструл кэрунт,
Баладе'нцелепте, бэтрыне,
Че'н вякурь дестойничь не-ау врут.

Слэви-вом ероикул нуме,
'Н ачя бэтэлие кэзут
Ши'н фаца меморией сфинте
Ной цэрий журэм сэ-й фим скут!

Рефрен:
Прин време пурта-вом
Нумеле мындрей цэрь.
Ту, Република либертэций,
Ешть крезул ын пашниче зэрь.

I (українською)
Ми славимо край Придністров'я,
Де люди пишаються тим,
Що дружбою, ладом, любов'ю
Навіки пов'язані з ним.

Прославимо наші заводи,
Широкі лани і міста,
Тут чесно працюють народи
На благо Вітчизни труда.

Приспів:
Через доли і води
Пронесемо ім'я
Ми Республіки свободи,
Хай живе тут народів сім'я.

𝄆 Припев (на русском): 𝄇
Пронесём через годы
Имя гордой страны
И Республике свободы
Как правде, мы будем верны.

Latin script

I (na rússkom)
My slávu poyóm Pridnestróviu,
Zdeś drúzhba naródov krepká,
Velíkoy synóvney lyubóviu
My spáyany s nim na veká.

Vosslávim sadý i zavódy,
Posyólki, polyá, gorodá
V nikh dólgiye slávnyye gódy
Na blágo Otchízny trudá.

Pripév:
Pronesyóm chérez gódy
Ímya górdoy straný
I Respúblike svobódy
Kak právde, my búdem verný.

II (în romấnă)
Cântá-vom și văi, și colíne,
Lucéferi din Nístrul cărúnt,
Baláde-nțelépte, bătrấne,
Ce-n veácuri destóinici ne-au vrut.

Slăví-vom eróicul núme,
'N aceá bătălíe căzút
Și-n fáța memóriei sfínte
Noi țắrii jurắm să-i fim scut!

Refrén:
Prin vréme purtá-vom
Númele mấndrei țắri.
Tu, República libertắții,
Éști crézul în páșnice zắri.

I (ukraḯnśkoiu):
My slávymo krai Prydnistróvya,
De liúdy pýshaiuťsia tym,
Shcho drúzhboiu, ládom, liubóvyu
Navíky povyázani z nym.

Proslávymo náshi zavódy,
Shyróki laný i mistá,
Tut chésno praciúiuť naródy
Na bláho Vitchýzny trudá.

Prýspiv:
Chérez dóly i vódy
Pronesémo imyá
My Respúbliky svobódy,
Khai zhyvé tut naródiv simyá.

𝄆 Pripév (na rússkom): 𝄇
Pronesyóm chérez gódy
Ímya górdoy straný
I Respúblike svobódy
Kak právde, my búdem verný.

IPA transcription as sung (Note: See: Help:IPA/Russian and Russian phonology.; Help:IPA/Romanian and Romanian phonology.; Help:IPA/Ukrainian and Ukrainian phonology.)

1 [nɐ‿ˈru.skəm]
[mɨ ˈsɫa.vu pɐˈjɵm prʲɪ.dʲnʲɪˈstro.v⁽ʲ⁾ju |]
[zʲdʲɛzʲ‿ˈdru.ʐbɐ nɐˈro.dɐf krʲɪpˈka |]
[vʲɛˈlʲi.kɐj sɨˈno.vnʲɛj lʲʊˈbo.v⁽ʲ⁾ju]
[mɨ ˈspa.jɐ.nɨ s‿nʲim nɐ‿vʲɪˈka ǁ]

[vɐsˈsɫa.vʲɪm sɐˈdɨ i zɐˈvo.dɨ |]
[pɐˈsʲɵɫ.kʲi pɐˈlʲa ɡɐ.rɐˈda]
[v‿nʲiɣ‿ˈdoɫ.ɡʲi.jɛ ˈsɫa.vnɨ.jɛ ˈɡo.dɨ]
[nɐ‿ˈbɫa.ɡɐ ɐtˈtɕi.znɨ trʊˈda ǁ]

[prʲɪˈpʲɛf]:
[prɐ.nʲɪˈsʲɵm ˈtɕɛ.rʲɛz‿ˈɡo.dɨ]
[ˈi.mʲɐ ˈɡor.dɐj strɐˈnɨ]
[i rʲɪˈspu.blʲi.kʲɛ svɐˈbo.dɨ]
[kak ˈpra.vdʲɛ mɨ ˈbu.dʲɛm vʲɪrˈnɨ ǁ]

2 [ɨn roˈmɨ.nə]:
[kɨnˈta‿vom ʃi ˈvəj ʃi koˈli.ne |]
[luˈtʃe.ferʲ din ˈnis.trul kəˈrunt |]
[baˈla.de‿n.tseˈlep.te bəˈtrɨ.ne |]
[tʃe‿n ˈve̯a.kurʲ desˈtoj.nitʃʲ ne̯aw ˈvrut ‖]

[sləˈvi.vom eˈro.i.kul ˈnu.me |]
[n‿aˈtʃe̯a bə.təˈli.je kəˈzut |]
[ʃi‿n ˈfa.tsa meˈmo.ri.jej ˈsfin.te |]
[noj ˈtsə.rij ʒuˈrəm sə‿j fim ˈskut ‖]

[reˈfren]
[prin ˈvre.me purˈta.vom |]
[ˈnu.me.le ˈmɨn.drej ˈtsərʲ ‖]
[tu reˈpub.li.ka li.berˈtə.tsij |]
[jeʃtʲ ˈkre.zul ɨn ˈpaʃ.ni.tʃe ˈzərʲ ‖]

1 [ʊ.krɐˈjinʲ.sʲko.jʊ]:
[mɪ ˈsɫɑ.ʋɪ.mo ˈkrɑj prɪ.d⁽ʲ⁾n⁽ʲ⁾i.ˈstrɔ.ʋjɐ |]
[dɛ ˈlʲu.dɪ pɪ.ˈʃɑ.jʊt.t͡sʲɐ ˈtɪm |]
[ʃt͡ʃɔ ˈdruʒ.bo.jʊ | ˈɫɑ.dom | lʲʊ.ˈbɔ.ʋjʊ]
[nɐ.ˈʋ⁽ʲ⁾i.kɪ po.ˈʋjɑ.zɐ.n⁽ʲ⁾i ˈz‿nɪm ǁ]

[pro.ˈsɫɑ.ʋɪ.mo ˈnɑ.ʃ⁽ʲ⁾i zɐ.ˈwɔ.dɪ |]
[ʃɪ.ˈrɔ.k⁽ʲ⁾i ɫɐ.ˈnɪ i m⁽ʲ⁾i.ˈstɑ |]
[tut ˈt͡ʃɛs.no prɐ.ˈt͡sʲu.jʊtʲ nɐ.ˈrɔ.dɪ]
[nɑ ˈbɫɑ.ɦo ʋ⁽ʲ⁾it.ˈt͡ʃɪz.nɪ trʊ.ˈdɑ ǁ]

[ˈprɪs⁽ʲ⁾.p⁽ʲ⁾iu̯]
[ˈt͡ʃɛ.rez ˈdɔ.ɫɪ i ˈwɔ.dɪ]
[pro.ne.ˈsɛ.mo i.ˈmjɑ]
[mɪ res.ˈpub.l⁽ʲ⁾i.kɪ swo.ˈbɔ.dɪ]
[xɑj ʒɪ.ˈʋɛ tut nɐ.ˈrɔ.d⁽ʲ⁾iu̯ s⁽ʲ⁾iˈmjɑ ǁ]

𝄆 [prʲɪˈpʲɛf nɐ‿ˈru.skəm]: 𝄇
[prɐ.nʲɪˈsʲɵm ˈtɕɛ.rʲɛz‿ˈɡo.dɨ]
[ˈi.mʲɐ ˈɡor.dɐj strɐˈnɨ]
[i rʲɪˈspu.blʲi.kʲɛ svɐˈbo.dɨ]
[kak ˈpra.vdʲɛ mɨ ˈbu.dʲɛm vʲɪrˈnɨ ǁ]

English Translation

I (in Russian)
We sing the praises of Transnistria,
Where the friendship of nations is strong,
With great filial love
Forever to it we are bound.

Let us glorify the gardens and factories,
The villages, fields, and cities,
Where for long and glorious years
We've toiled for the sake of the Fatherland

Refrain:
Through years we shall carry
The name of our proud country.
And to the Republic of freedom,
As to justice, faithful we shall be.

II (in Romanian)
We shall chant about valleys and hills,
The stars of the ancient Dniester,
And the wise old ballads
Wanting us to be worthy for centuries.

We shall glorify the heroic names
Of those that died in battle.
And in the face of holy memory
We swear to safeguard our country!

Refrain:
Through aeons we shall carry
The proud name of our country.
Thou, Republic of liberty –
Thou art the creed in peaceful horizons.

I (in Ukrainian)
We glorify the land of Transnistria,
Where people are proud of her.
With which friendship, order, love
Are forever connected.

Let's glorify our factories,
Wide fields and cities,
Here people toil sincerely
For the benefit of the Fatherland.

Refrain:
Through the valleys and waters
We shall carry our proud name.
We are the Republic of freedom.
Long live the family of nations here.

𝄆 Refrain (in Russian): 𝄇
Through years we shall carry
The name of our proud country.
And to the Republic of freedom,
As to justice, faithful we shall be.
