= Bruno, Duke of Saxony =

Duke of Saxony

Saint Bruno of Saxony
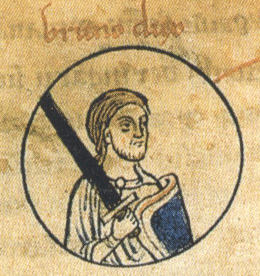
- Bruno dux, depiction in the Chronica sancti Pantaleonis (about 1237)

Duke and Martyr
- Born: c. 830/840
- Died: 2 February 880; Battle of Lüneburg Heath
- Venerated in: Catholic Church, Eastern Orthodox Church
- Major shrine: Ebstorf Abbey
- Feast: 2 February
- Patronage: Brunswick

Bruno, also called Brun or Braun (c. 830/840 – 2 February 880), a member of the Ottonian dynasty, was Duke of Saxony from 866 until his death in 880. He is rated as an ancestor of the Brunonids, a cadet branch of the Ottonians, though an affiliation is uncertain. Bruno was killed fighting against Norse warriors in the Battle of Lüneburg Heath and is venerated as one of the Ebsdorf Martyrs.

== Life ==
He was the eldest son of the Saxon count Liudolf (died 866) and his wife, Oda. His father held large estates in Eastphalia along the Leine river, where in 852 he founded the Brunshausen monastery. Bruno succeeded his father and is mentioned as a count in 877.

While Liudolf is described as dux orientalis Saxonum, i.e. leader in East Saxony (Eastphalia), it is possible that Bruno, according to the Res gestae saxonicae by the medieval chronicler Widukind of Corvey, already was dux totius Saxonum, duke (Herzog) of all Saxony. The rise of his family in East Francia is documented by the fact that Bruno's sister Liutgard in 874 married the Carolingian prince Louis the Younger, second son of King Louis the German, whereafter he is called ducem et fratrem reinæ, 'duke and the queen's brother' in the Annales Fuldenses. Nothing is known of Bruno's marriage and children.

He supported his brother-in-law, Louis the Younger, in the fights with his uncle, Emperor Charles the Bald. As Saxon commander-in-chief during the Viking invasions, he died, along with several other noblemen, in a battle against "Norsemen" warriors (probably a Danish contingent of the Great Heathen Army, defeated by King Alfred the Great) on Candlemas Day, 2 February 880. The mid-winter battle was a crushing defeat; Duke Bruno, the bishops of Minden and Hildesheim, as well as twelve Saxon counts and several other noblemen, were killed. According to the chronicler Bishop Thietmar of Merseburg, Bruno died in a flooded river, which probably took place during the battle or a retreat. He was succeeded by his younger brother Otto the Illustrious, whose son Henry the Fowler became King of East Francia in 919.

== Veneration ==
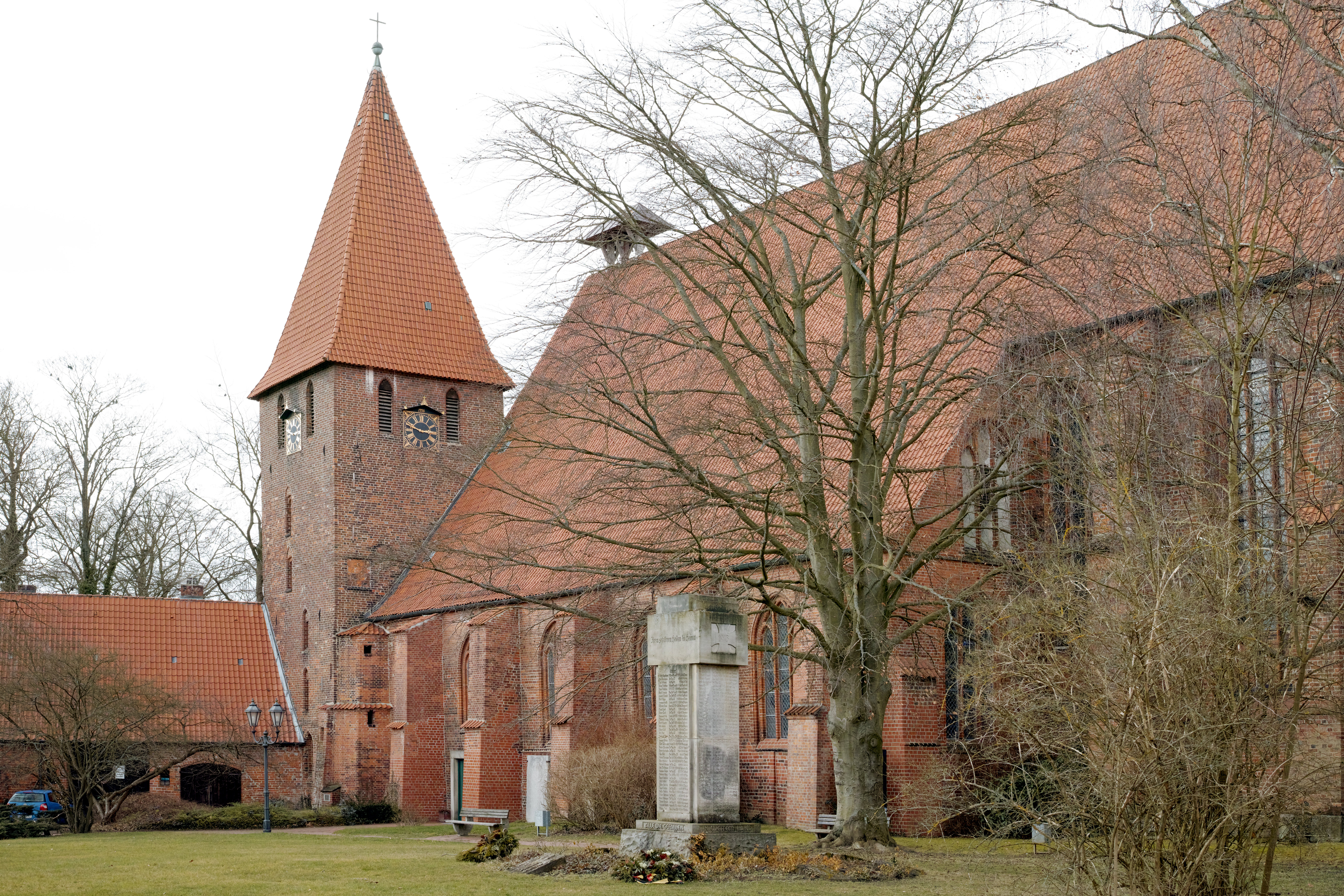
Ebstorf Abbey

Bruno is venerated as a saint and martyr in the Catholic Church, being honoured with a feast day on 2 February under the name St. Bruno of Saxony. About 1160 of his relics were translated by the Dannenberg counts to Ebstorf Abbey near Uelzen, which from the 14th century was defined as the place of the 880 battle and became a major pilgrimage site.

According to tradition, Bruno is also the founder of Brunswick as well as the ancestor of the local count Brun I (a candidate in the royal election of 1002) and his Brunonid descendants. Consistent naming suggests a kinship; however, some mentions appear to refer to an earlier Saxon margrave called Brun the Younger, possibly Bruno's grandfather.

== See also ==
- Ebstorf Map

== Sources ==
- Reuter, Timothy (trans.) The Annals of Fulda. (Manchester Medieval series, Ninth-Century Histories, Volume II.) Manchester: Manchester University Press, 1992.

Bruno, Duke of Saxony Ottonian dynasty
Regnal titles
Preceded by Liudolf	Duke of Saxony; 866–880	Succeeded by Otto I
