= Zakharovo, Zakharovsky District, Ryazan Oblast =

Rural locality in Ryazan Oblast, Russia

Coordinates: 54°22′06″N 39°16′37″E

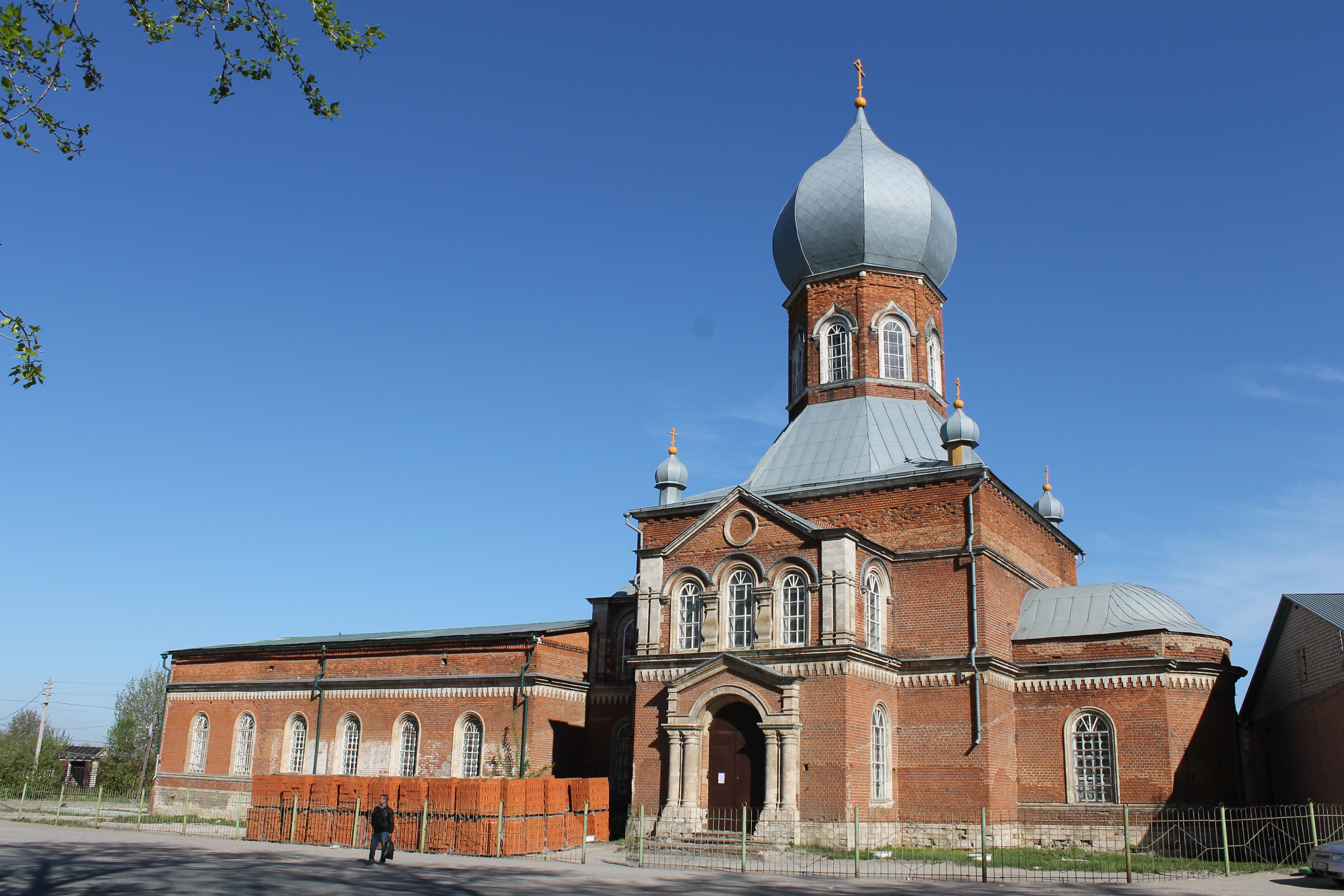
Church of Saint John the Apostle

Zakharovo (Russian: Захарово) is a rural locality (a selo) and the administrative center of Zakharovsky District, Ryazan Oblast, Russia. Population: 2,739 (2010 census); 2,956 (2002 census); 3,174 (1989 Soviet census).
