= Lothar I of Stade =

German Roman Catholic saints

Lothar I (c. 840-880), Count of Stade, possibly a descendant of Saxon leader Widukind.

Lothar was one of the twelve counts killed in the Battle of Ebstorf (also called the Battle of Lüneburg Heath) which pitted the army of Louis III of France against the Great Heathen Army of Norsemen. This battle was documented in the Annals of Fulda. The Catholic Church recognizes those killed as the Martyrs of Ebsdorf whose feast day is 2 February.

Lothar married Oda of Saxony, possibly the daughter of Liudolf, Duke of Saxony. Lothar and Oda had one child:

- Lothar II, Count of Stade

Lothar was succeeded by his son as Count of Stade upon his death.
