= Utushka lugovaya =

"Утушка луговая"
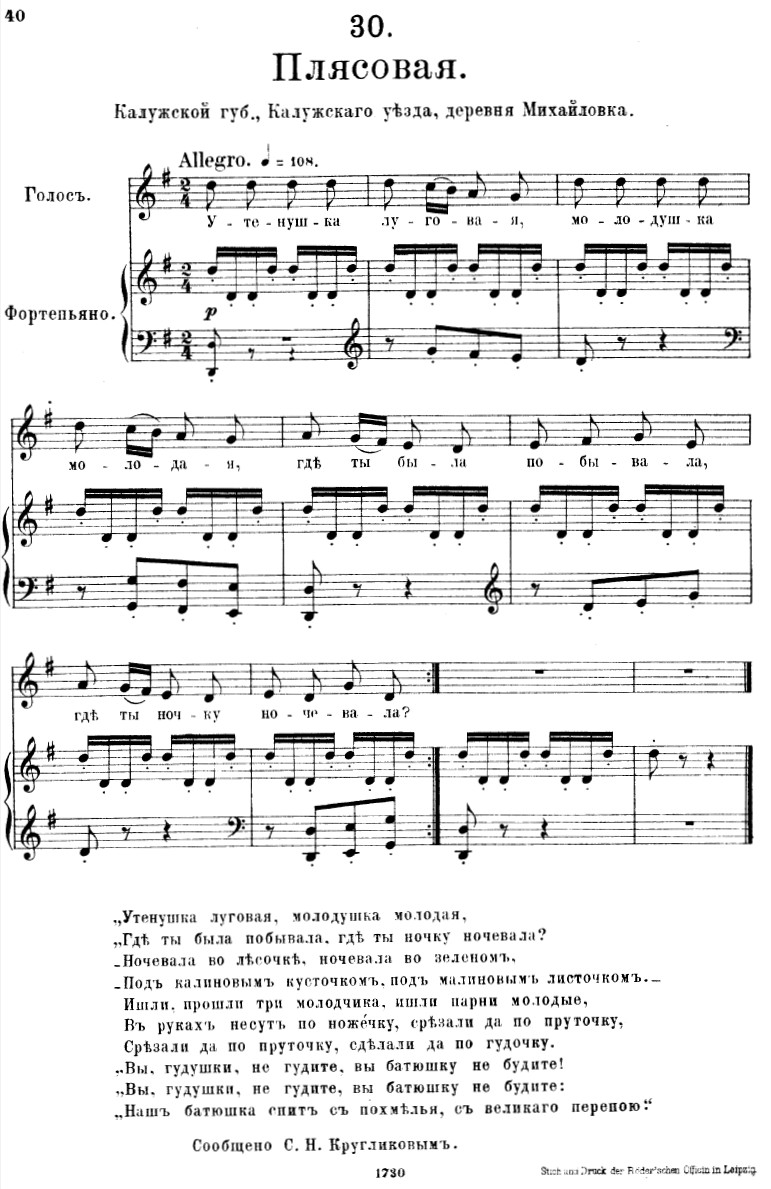
- Utushka lugovaya

Song
- Language: Russian
- English title: "A Little Meadow Duck"
- Written: Before 1791
- Genre: Folk
- Songwriter(s): Unknown

"Utushka lugovaya" (Russian: Утушка луговая, lit. A Little Meadow Duck) is an ancient Russian folk song.

== Synopsis ==
A young woman or maiden, also called utushka lugovaya, spends a night in the wood (or in the meadow), near a willow. Several young men pass by and make several gudocheks – each makes one for himself. The maiden asks the gudocheks not to tinkle, not to wake her (however, in some versions, her father) up.

== Commentary ==
=== Historical background ===
According to Alexander Tereshchenko, ″Utushka lugovaya″ could be performed during traditional Russian marriage celebrations. Pavel Svinyin wrote that the Don Cossacks used the song in matchmaking.

Some researchers consider that image ("Utushka lugovaya"/ "Young duck") as a traditional image of the young woman or bride.

=== Genre characteristics ===
A number of sources mention the song as a plyasovaya or a khorovodnaya. Alexander Potebnja regards it – for its time signature – as an example of the so-called summer or spring songs.

== Settings and performance ==
Before 1792, Vasily Pashkevich created for his third opera a theme based on the song. In the following two centuries, many composers (such as P. I. Tchaikovsky, Nikolai Rimsky-Korsakov, Anatoly Lyadov, Alexander Ivanov-Kramskoi) arranged "Utushka lugovaya".

The song appeared in the repertoires of Lidia Ruslanova, Lyudmila Zykina, Alexandra Strelchenko, and other famous Russian folk singers.

== Words ==
Russian

Ах, утушка моя луговая,
Молодушка моя молодая.
Ой, люли, люли, люли, люли, молодая.
Ой, люли, люли, люли, люли, молодая.

Где ты была, была-побывала,
Где всю ночку ты да ночевала?
Ой, люли, люли, люли, люли, ночевала.
Ой, люли, люли, люли, люли, ночевала.

Ночевала да я во лесочке
Под ракитовым да под кусточком.
Ой, люли, люли, люли, люли, под кусточком.
Ой, люли, люли, люли, люли, под кусточком.

Как шли-прошли парни молодые,
Два молодчика, ой, да удалые,
Ой, люли, люли, люли, люли, удалые.
Ой, люли, люли, люли, люли, удалые.

Они срезали да по пруточку,
Они сделали да по гудочку.
Ой, люли, люли, люли, люли, по гудочку.
Ой, люли, люли, люли, люли, по гудочку.

Вы, гудочки, ой, да не гудите,
Мово батюшку да не будите.
Ой, люли, люли, люли, люли, не будите.
Ой, люли, люли, люли, люли, не будите.

Poetic translation

Oh, my duckling, oh, my rantipole,
Oh, my duckling, oh, my rantipole,
Ah, lyuli, lyuli, lyuli, lyuli, rantipole,
Ah, lyuli, lyuli, lyuli, lyuli, rantipole.

Where have you met your last morning,
Where have you met your last morning,
Ooooooooh...

I have spent that night but on the willow,
I have spent that night but on the willow,
Ah, lyuli, lyuli, lyuli, lyuli, on the willow,
Ah, lyuli, lyuli, lyuli, lyuli, on the willow.

Two young craftsmen went through the willows,
Two young men but also two bold spirits,
Ooooooooh...

They have fallen two low and little oaks,
They have made two bows, two gudocheks,
Ah, lyuli, lyuli, lyuli, lyuli, two gudocheks,
Ah, lyuli, lyuli, lyuli, lyuli, two gudocheks.

Hey, my gudocheks, don't tinkle,
Leave me alone, leave me single,
Ah, lyuli, lyuli, lyuli, lyuli, leave me single,
Ah, lyuli, lyuli, lyuli, lyuli, leave me single.
