= Ebstorf Abbey =

Monastery in Germany

Coordinates: 53°01′50″N 10°24′44″E

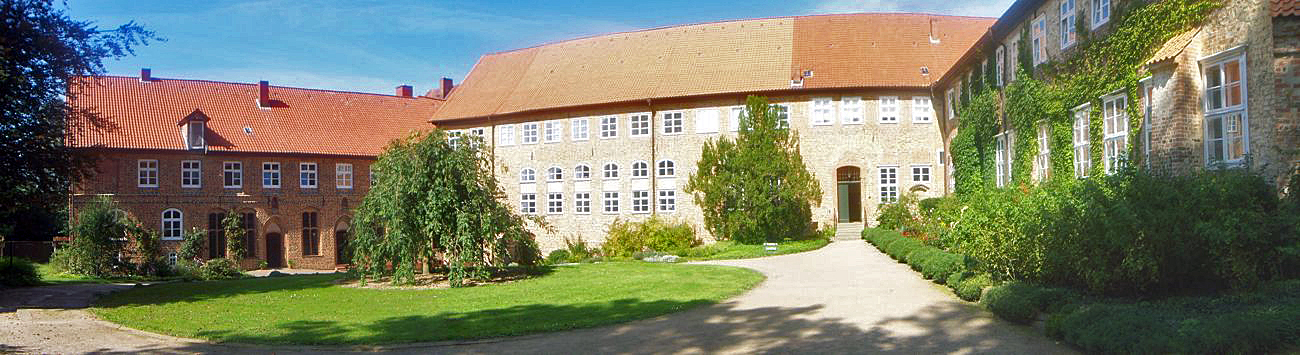
Ebstorf Abbey, view of the inner courtyard

Ebstorf Abbey (German: Abtei Ebstorf or German: Kloster Ebstorf) is a Lutheran convent of nuns that is located near the Lower Saxon town of Uelzen, in Germany.

== History ==
The abbey was founded around 1160 as the Priory of Saint Maurice for the Premonstratensian Canons Regular by Volrad von Bodwede, Count of Dannenberg, and a nephew of Henry the Lion. By founding the priory, Volrad hoped to consolidate his influence over the region. It is mentioned in the records for the first time in 1197. It belongs to the six so-called Lüneklöstern (monasteries of Lüne) which became Lutheran convents following the Protestant Reformation.

After a fire in the 13th century the house was given to the Benedictine nuns of Walsrode Abbey who established a daughter house there, and Ebstorf became a place of Marian pilgrimage (Marienwallfahrtsort). The abbey buildings, dating from the 14th century and built in a North German Brick Gothic style, are fully preserved today, as is the church, which still has the raised nun's gallery. The Propstei ("provostry") dates to the 15th century.

In the 15th century the life of the nuns changed, as a result of their being placed under the reforming program of the newly established Bursfelde Congregation, that demanded a stricter way of life.

In 1529 the Duke of Welf, Ernest the Confessor from Celle converted the monastery to a Lutheran convent, but the transformation of the monastery was not completed until 1565. It is currently one of several Lutheran convents that are maintained by the Monastic Chamber of Hanover (German: Klosterkammer Hannover), an institution of the former Kingdom of Hanover founded by its Prince-Regent, later King George IV of the United Kingdom, in 1818, in order to manage and preserve the estates of Lutheran convents on their behalf. It is now maintained as an institution of Hanover's successor state of Lower Saxony. Lutheran canonesses still live there today under the authority of a Lutheran abbess. The canonesses of Ebstorf Abbey attend Mass at Ebstorf Evangelical Lutheran Church, in addition to participating in the daily prayer collectively.

== Cultural heritage ==
The abbey is famous for the Ebstorf Map, a mappa mundi from the 13th century. The original was burned during a bombing raid in 1943 on Hanover. However a faithful copy of the original can be seen in the monastery.

Other points of interest are the medieval stained glass windows in the Nonnenchor (nun's choir), the statues of the Virgin Mary in the cloisters which date from the 13th to 15th centuries, a figure of Saint Maurice, the patron saint of the house, a baptismal font dating from 1310 and a pulpit built in 1615. In addition there a various medieval chests and cupboards.

== See also ==
- Evangelical Sisterhood of Mary
- Sisters of the Holy Spirit at Alsike Convent

== Bibliography ==
- Ein Rundgang durch Kloster Ebstorf. Einführender Text von Michael Wolfson, Aufnahmen von Jutta Brüdern. Mit Literaturhinweisen. Königstein i. Ts. 2002 (= Die Blauen Bücher). ISBN 3-7845-2403-6
- Sibylle Appuhn-Radtke, Kloster Ebstorf, DKV-Kunstführer Nr. 176, 12. Auflage, München/Berlin: Kunstverlag.de Ebstory Abbey on Deutscher Kunstverlag [2002]
- "Die mittelalterliche Baugeschichte des Langen Schlafhauses im Kloster Ebstorf." Volker Hemmerich. Schwerin: T. Helms, 2002
