= Alice Woodby McKane =

American physician

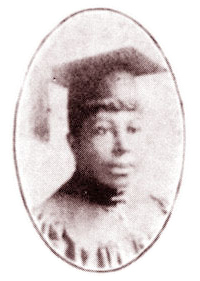
Alice Woodby in 1892

Alice Woodby McKane (1865– 6 March 1948) was the first woman to work as a medical doctor in Savannah, Georgia. She was not only known as a physician but also as a politician and an author. She and her husband Cornelius McKane contributed an important part in medical history. She opened the first school of nurse training for black people in Savannah. She also helped her husband to make his dream which was opening the Hospital in Liberia come true. After returning from Liberia, they established the MCKane Hospital for Women and Children and later was known as Charity Hospital to treat for all people in Savannah, especially for African American people.

== Childhood and education ==
McKane was born February 12, 1865 Bridgewater, Pennsylvania. Her parents, who were Charles and Elizabeth Fraiser Woodby, died before she reached the age of seven and she lost her vision for three years. Alice attended public schools and Hampton Normal and Agricultural Institute in Virginia. As an undergraduate student of the Institute for Colored Youth, which later became Cheyney University of Pennsylvania, she was a secretary of the principal Fannie Coppin. She graduated from the Institute for Colored Youth in Philadelphia and entered to the Woman's Medical College of Pennsylvania in 1889. In 1892, she graduated and received a medical degree with high honors.

== Career ==
=== Medical practice ===
Alice moved to Augusta, Georgia, where she taught at the Haines Normal and Industrial Institute, now the Lucy Craft Laney High School. She met her husband, Cornelius McKane who was the grandson of a Liberian king, and moved with him to his physician's practice in Savannah. She was the only black female physician in Georgia in 1892. In 1893, the couple opened the McKane Training School for Nurses, a school for black nurses and the first one of its kind in Southeast Georgia. The first two-year course of the school was begun on September 1, 1893. She worked as a principal of the school. Students who wanted to apply to this course were required to pass a test about English, mathematic, and geography. This course provided all necessary knowledges about anatomy, physiology, hygiene, midwifery, therapeutic, and chemistry to prepared students to be nurses. The course was completed in May 1895.

After finishing the first course, her husband decided to go back to Africa. The McKane Training School for Nurses were taken by William Christopher Blackman. They went to New York to prepare food and medical supplies to their trip to Liberia on June 5, 1895. In August 1895, they opened the first hospital along with a drugstore and a nurse training school in Monrovia, Liberia. By requiring of U.S. government, Alice was chosen to do health examination for black Civil War veterans who came to Liberia from America. In 1896, she contracted African fever. She and her husband were forced to return to America. They came back to Savannah in February 1896. She continued to develop the MCKane Training School for Nurses and establish the MCKane Hospital for Women and Children. In 1901, the hospital was changed the name to the Charity Hospital.

=== Writing and political practice ===
In 1909, Alice and her husband moved to Boston for better educational opportunities for their children. After her husband, Cornelius McKane, died at age fifty in 1912, Alice continued her medical career and also engaged to political activities and writing. She participated in the women's suffrage movement. She was a Republican committee woman and a member of the National Associate for the Advancement of Colored People (NAACP). She published two books. The first book was The Fraternal Sick Book, which was written about healing in 1913. She also wrote and published Clover Leaves, a poetry book in 1914. Alice died on March 6, 1948, at age eighty-three.
