= Alexander Vasilyevich Alexandrov =

Soviet and Russian composer (1883–1946)

Alexander Vasilyevich Alexandrov Александр Васильевич Александров
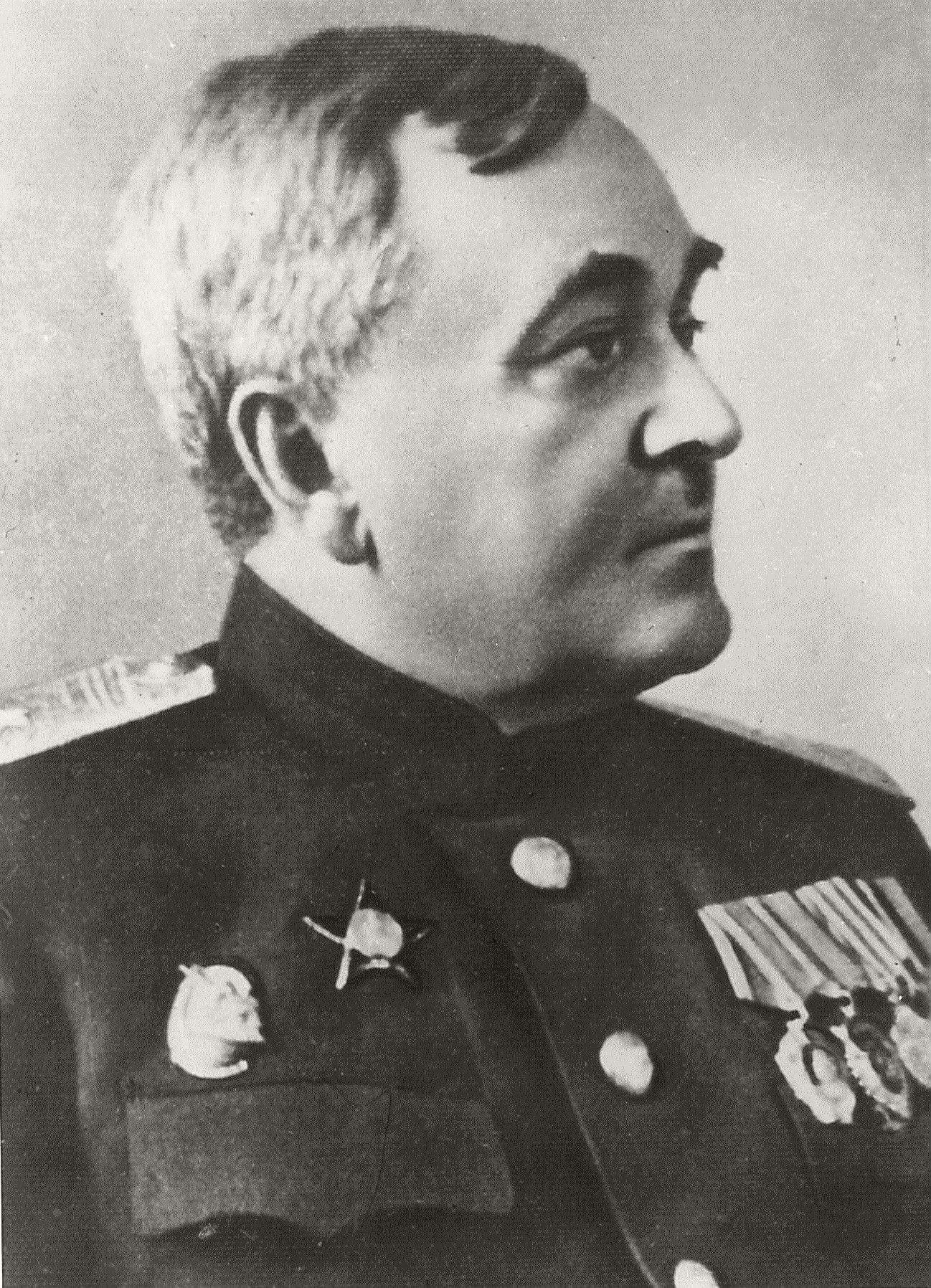

Background information
- Born: Alexander Vasilyevich Koptelov (or Koptelev); April 13, 1883; Plakhino, Ryazan Governorate, Russian Empire
- Died: July 8, 1946 (aged 63) Berlin, Soviet occupation zone in Germany
- Occupations: Composer, musician

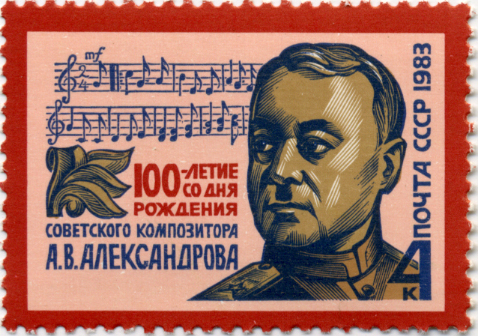
1983 Soviet stamp honoring the 100th anniversary of the birth of Alexander Alexandrov

Alexander Vasilyevich Alexandrov (Note: Russian: Александр Васильевич Александров, romanized: Aleksándr Vasílyevich Aleksándrov, known by the diminutive Sasha) (13 April [O.S. 1 April] 1883 – 8 July 1946; born Koptelov or Koptelev) was a Soviet and Russian composer and founder of the Alexandrov Ensemble, who wrote the music for the State Anthem of the Soviet Union, which in 2000 became the National Anthem of the Russian Federation (with new lyrics). During his career, he also worked as a professor of the Moscow Conservatory, and became a Doctor of Arts. His work was recognized by the awards of the title of People's Artist of the USSR and two Stalin Prizes.

== Background ==
Alexander Vasilyevich Alexandrov, known as Sasha, was born on 13 April 1883 in Plakhino, a village in Ryazan Governorate south-east of Moscow. As a boy, his singing was so impressive that he traveled to Saint Petersburg to become a chorister at Kazan Cathedral.

== Career ==
A pupil of Medtner, Alexandrov studied composition at Saint Petersburg and in Moscow, where he eventually became professor of music in 1918 and choirmaster at Christ the Savior from 1918 to 1922.

=== Alexandrov Ensemble ===
Alexandrov founded the Alexandrov Ensemble, and spent many years as its director, in which role he gained favor with Joseph Stalin, the country's ruler during the last two decades of Alexandrov's life. His choir participated successfully in the Universal Exposition of 1937 in Paris.

=== Works ===
In 1942, Stalin commissioned Alexandrov and lyricists Sergey Mikhalkov and Gabriel El-Registan to create a new Soviet national anthem, which was officially adopted on 1 January 1944 and was used by the Soviet Union until its collapse in 1991. It became the National Anthem of Russia in December 2000, with Mikhalkov writing the new lyrics. Alexandrov also composed the 1941 call to arms, "The Sacred War", and the official march of the Soviet and now Russian Armed Forces, the Song of the Soviet Army. His works include a number of settings of various Russian folk songs, for example, "Utushka lugovaya".

== Death ==
Alexandrov had a heart attack and died on 8 July 1946 at the age of 63, while on tour in Berlin; some records say he was returning from Germany. (Note: The exact place of his death is still in dispute and apparently controversial.) He was buried at the Novodevichy Cemetery in Moscow.

== See also ==
"State Anthem of the Soviet Union"
One verse, instrumental

- Alexandrov Ensemble
- Alexandrov Ensemble choir
- Alexandrov Ensemble soloists
- Alexandrov Ensemble discography
- Boris Alexandrovich Alexandrov
