= Martyrs of Ebsdorf =

Saxon Catholic martyrs and saints

The Martyrs of Ebsdorf were the Saxon combatants killed in the winter of 880 AD at the Battle of Lüneburg Heath near Ebstorf, Lower Saxony. They were subsequently declared martyrs by the church, with their feast day being 2 February.

== Recognised martyrs ==
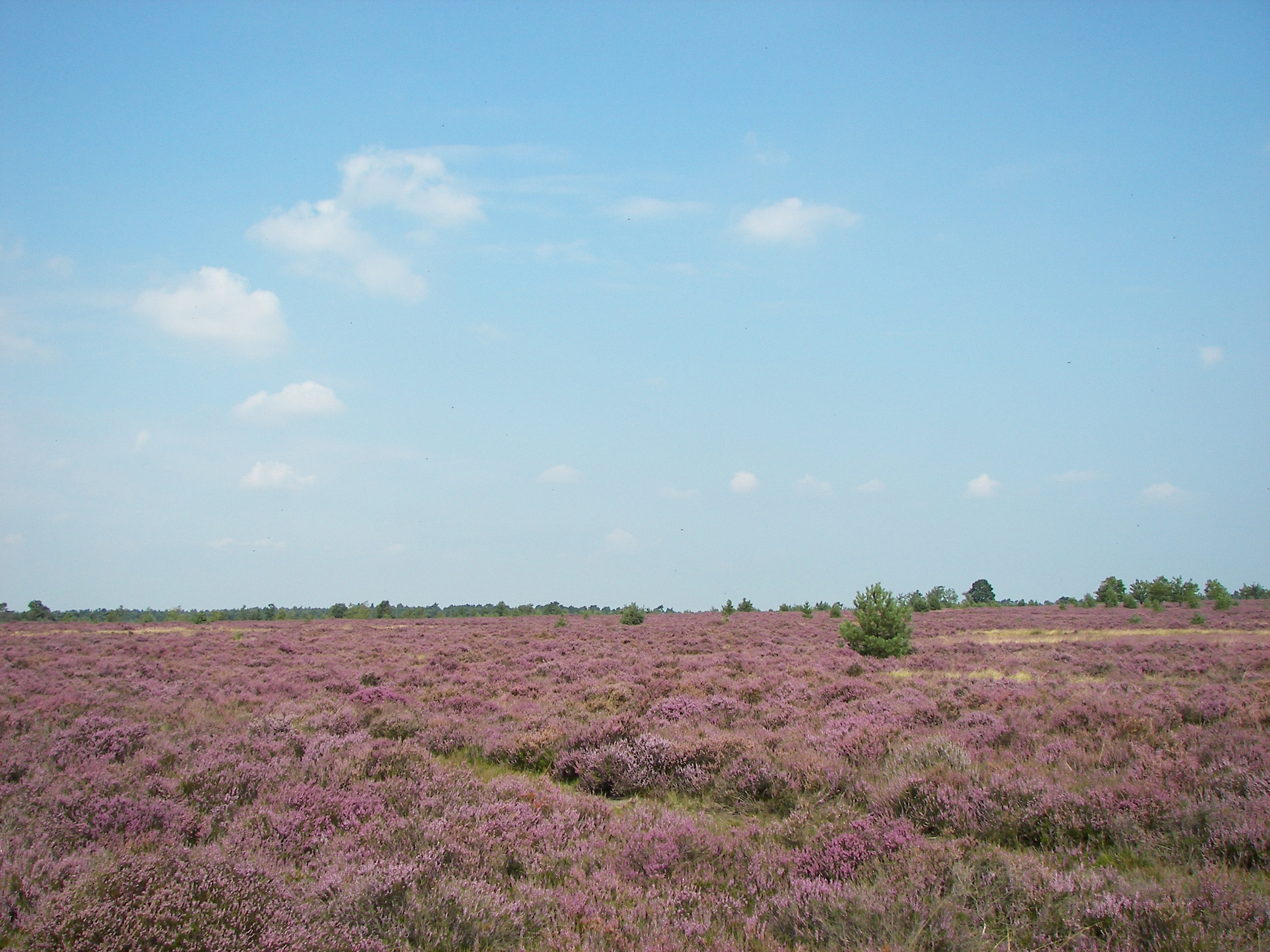
The Lüneburg Heath

The Saxons consisted of 4 bishops, 11 noblemen, and numerous unknown foot soldiers. Recognised members include Bruno of Saxony, Marquard of Hildesheim and Theodorich of Minden. Some Synaxariums, however, contain a list of 32 saints:

Bishops

- Marquard, bishop of Hildesheim;
- Gobbert, bishop of Osnabrück;
- Erlulf, bishop of Verden;
- Dietrich (or Theodorich, Theodorik, Theodoricus), bishop of Minden;

Knights

- Wigmann
- Bardo (3×)
- Thioterik (2×)
- Gerrich
- Liudolf
- Folkward
- Avan

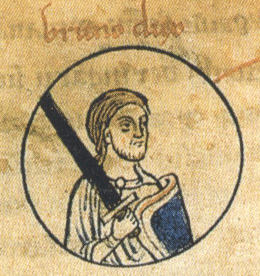
Bruno, Duke of Saxony

Noblemen

- Liuthar (or Lothar), Count of Stade
- Bruno, Duke of Saxony
- Adelram
- Alfuïnus
- Addesta
- Aida (or Edi, 2×)
- Dodo
- Bodo (or Botho)
- Wal
- Halif
- Humilduïnus
- Adalwin
- Werinhart
- Theodorich
- Hildewart
- Bardolf
- Hivart

The Saxons were slain while fighting Norsemen of the Great Heathen Army who had recently been repelled from England at the Battle of Edington.
