= Battle of Lüneburg Heath =

880 battle between the Duchy of Saxony and the Norse Great Heathen Army

The Battle of Lüneburg Heath (also called the Battle of Ebstorf) was a conflict between the army of King Louis the Younger and the Norse Great Heathen Army fought on 2 February 880 CE, at Lüneburg Heath in today's Lower Saxony.

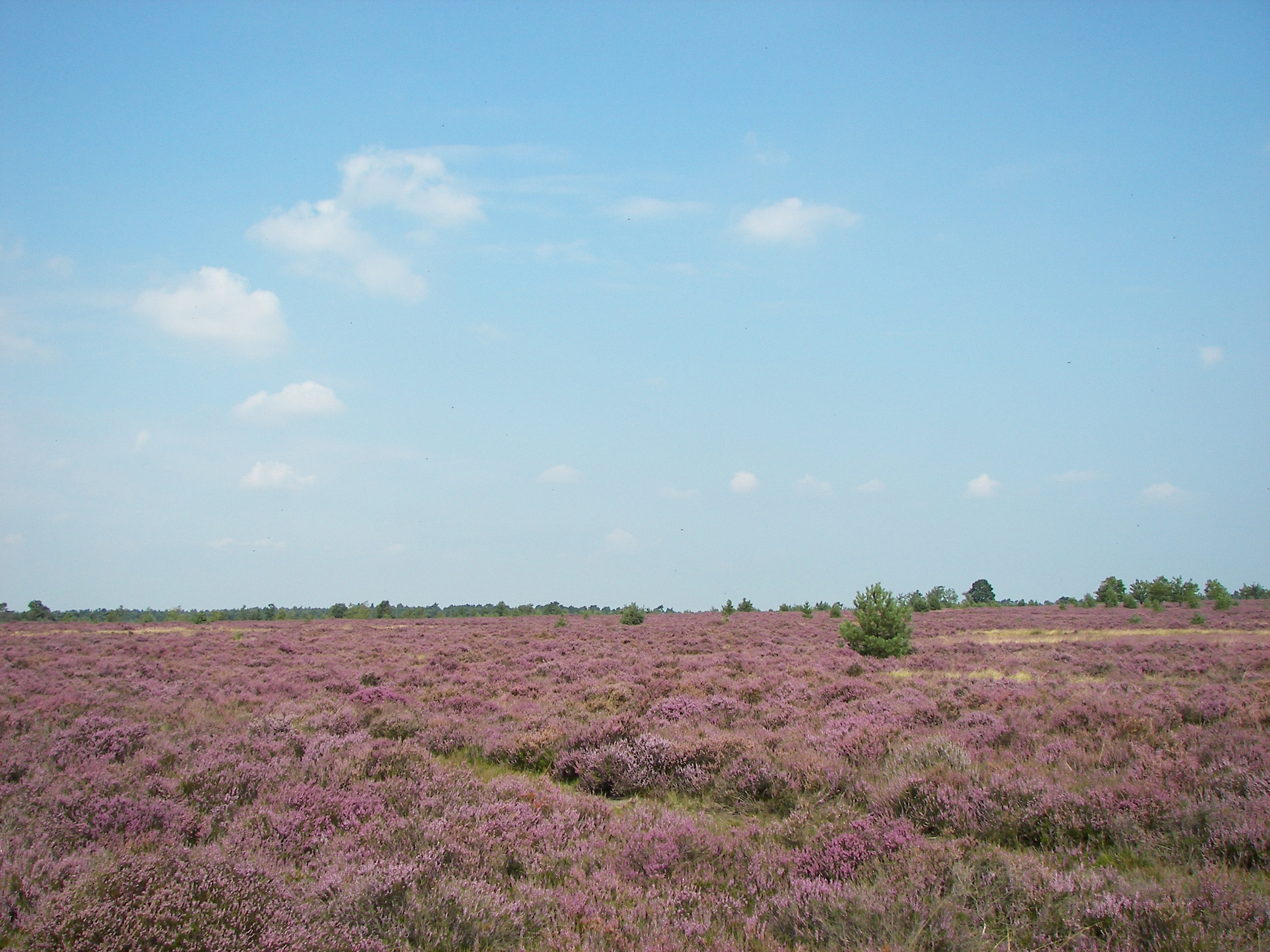
Lüneburg Heath

Following defeat by Alfred the Great at the Battle of Edington, the Norse Great Heathen Army moved from England to pillage the Duchy of Saxony. The army of Louis met the Norsemen at Lüneburg Heath. The Saxons were routed in a snowstorm, with the army being destroyed or captured.

Known combatants include Marquard of Hildesheim, Theodoric of Minden, Lothar I, Count of Stade, an unidentified count named "Bardonum" and Bruno, Duke of East Saxony who, according to the chronicles Annales Fuldenses and the Gesta Francorum, (Note: Bruno, son of Liudolf, died in one of two battles (one at the river Scheldt and one in Saxony) which are reported separately in the Annales Fuldenses. The Gesta Francorum lists "Bardonum...alterum Bardonum [et] tertium Bardonum" as three of the twelve counts who were killed fighting the Danes in 880 [120]. The other two counts named "Bardo" or "Bruno" have not been identified.) drowned in a river during the Saxon retreat. Those killed were recognized by the Catholic Church as the Martyrs of Ebsdorf, whose feast day is 2 February.

The Norse army was subsequently defeated at the Battle of Thimeon later that month and finally checked at the Battle of Saucourt.

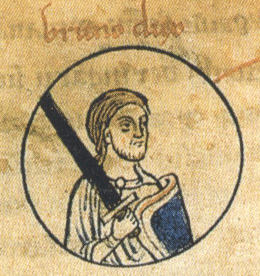
Bruno, Duke of Saxony
