= Cornelius McKane =

Guyanese-American physician and educator

Dr. Cornelius McKane (February 2, 1862 – 1912) was a Guyanese-American physician and educator. With his wife Alice Woodby McKane, he founded medical schools and hospitals in Savannah, Georgia and Monrovia, Liberia. The descendant of an African king, he was urged by his grandmother to return to his African roots to help his people. Upon his family's return to the United States, the Doctors McKane founded a hospital for African-Americans.

== Early life and education ==
McKane was born on February 2, 1862, in Georgetown, British Guiana. McKane's maternal great grandfather was Mannah Funacai, or "King George", ruler of the Vai and Dey tribes of what is now part of modern Liberia. His daughter Funicai was sold into slavery as a child, by her mother Twahalla, who was sold by King George for assisting the settlers of the American colonization society. King Funacai was resentful towards the Americans for attempting to stop the slave trade, in which he was very active, and resettling freedmen there. He attacked them relentlessly and forbade his people from helping them. Twahalla disobeyed, and he sold her. She then sold his favorite daughter, which was Funicai and they were both transported to Guyana by a Dutch shipping agent. Her surviving daughter was McKane's mother.

He accompanied his parents to Liberia when he was ten years old. At 18, he decided to move to the United States for an education. There he met Moses P. Wester, who housed him and helped him get a basic education.

In 1882 he returned to Liberia to study native languages and Arabic. He became an instructor in rural Sherbro, and eventually met the youngest sister of his great-grandmother, who said, "Tako-neh-ebenu Allah! (You have come bring God!)". He resolved to get more education and return to his people as a physician. He obtained medical degrees at the University of Vermont Medical College and Dartmouth Medical College.

== Early medical career ==
McKane traveled to Savannah, Georgia as he had heard of a need for medical doctors to serve the African descended community there. He co-founded the Southern Medical Association with three other doctors in 1892. In 1904, they expanded membership to dentists and pharmacists.

He married Dr. Alice Woodby in 1893. They founded the McKane Training School for Nurses later the same year. Cornelius was an administrator, and Alice was the principal.

== Liberia ==
In 1895 Cornelius McKane moved with his wife to Liberia. There, they founded McKane's Hospital and Training School in Monrovia. However, Alice McKane became ill with African Fever, and in 1896 the couple returned to Savannah with their daughter, who unfortunately died shortly afterwards.

== Return to the United States ==
Upon their return in 1896, the McKanes founded another Nursing school and hospital, the McKane Hospital for Women and Children. The hospital faced a continual lack of funding, in spite of numerous fundraisers. In 1901, the hospital's Board of Trustees petitioned the city of Savannah for assistance in funding. The McKanes opposed this move, and subsequently severed their association with the hospital. They continued to practice in Savannah.

In 1909, the McKanes were concerned for the quality of the education for their two surviving sons and relocated to Boston, where they practiced medicine, specializing in women's health. Cornelius died three years later.

== Views on African-American emigration to Liberia ==
McKane had spent the major part of his adult life preparing to be a missionary and helper to the people of Liberia and Africa as a whole. He spoke to audiences about the potential of the land and the opportunities to be had for Black Americans in Africa. He worked with the American Colonization Society to get funding and support for Americans to settle and prosper in Liberia.

After he and his wife had emigrated to Liberia, McKane began to have doubts about the enterprise. He found that the ACS did not support the colonists as they had promised. He felt that this contributed to the very high mortality rate of settlers. He criticized the organizations as people who "care more for gold than the perpetuation of the republic."

While he still felt that Liberia could be successful, he now believed that "Africa has her problems that can be best solved by native Africans. Negroes must solve the Negro problem in America."
