= Plakhino, Zakharovsky District of Ryazan Oblast =

Village in Zakharovsky District, Russia

Coordinates: 54°27′47″N 39°19′59″E

Plakhino (Russian: Пла́хино) is a village (selo) in Zakharovsky District of Ryazan Oblast, Russia. It is the birthplace of Alexander Vasilyevich Alexandrov, author of the music for the National Anthem of the Soviet Union.
