= Plakhino, Kholmogorsky District, Arkhangelsk Oblast =

Plakhino Плахино
- Village
- Location within Arkhangelsk Oblast Location within Russia
- Coordinates: 63°31′N 41°56′E
- Country: Russia
- Region: Arkhangelsk Oblast
- District: Kholmogorsky District

Population
  - Total: 9
- Time zone: UTC+3:00

Plakhino (Russian: Плахино) is a rural locality (a village) in Khavrogorskoye Rural Settlement of Kholmogorsky District, Arkhangelsk Oblast, Russia. The population was 9 as of 2010.

== Geography ==
Plakhino is located on the Pingisha River, 135 km south of Kholmogory (the district's administrative centre) by road. Zaozero is the nearest rural locality.
