= County of Dannenberg =

State of the Holy Roman Empire (1153–1303)

County of Dannenberg Grafschaft Dannenberg
- 1153–1303
- The county (in red) around 1250
- Status: State of the Holy Roman Empire
- Capital: Dannenberg
- Government: Feudal county
  - 1153–1166: Volrad I
  - 1289–1303: Nicholas
- Historical era: Middle Ages
  - Established: 1153
  - Disestablished: 1303
Succeeded by
Principality of Lüneburg
- Today part of: Germany

The County of Dannenberg (German: Grafschaft Dannenberg) was a fief in the Duchy of Saxony. Its heartland was largely identical with the present-day collective municipality of Elbtalaue in northern Germany.

Its historical origins go back to the middle of the 12th century, when Henry the Lion founded the five counties of Holstein, Ratzeburg, Schwerin, Dannenberg and Lüchow during the Ostsiedlung, or colonisation of the East, from the mouth of the river Elbe to the southern border of the March of Brandenburg, in order to protect the new regions and borders of his territory.

The County of Dannenberg is first mentioned in the records in 1153; its first count, until 1169, was Volrad I of Dannenberg. He came from a noble family, the Edlers of Salzwedel. The county lasted until 1303, when the last count, Nicholas of Dannenberg, relinquished all his rights between the Elbe and Jeetzel rivers to Duke Otto the Strict, and it is finally mentioned in the records in 1311.

== History ==
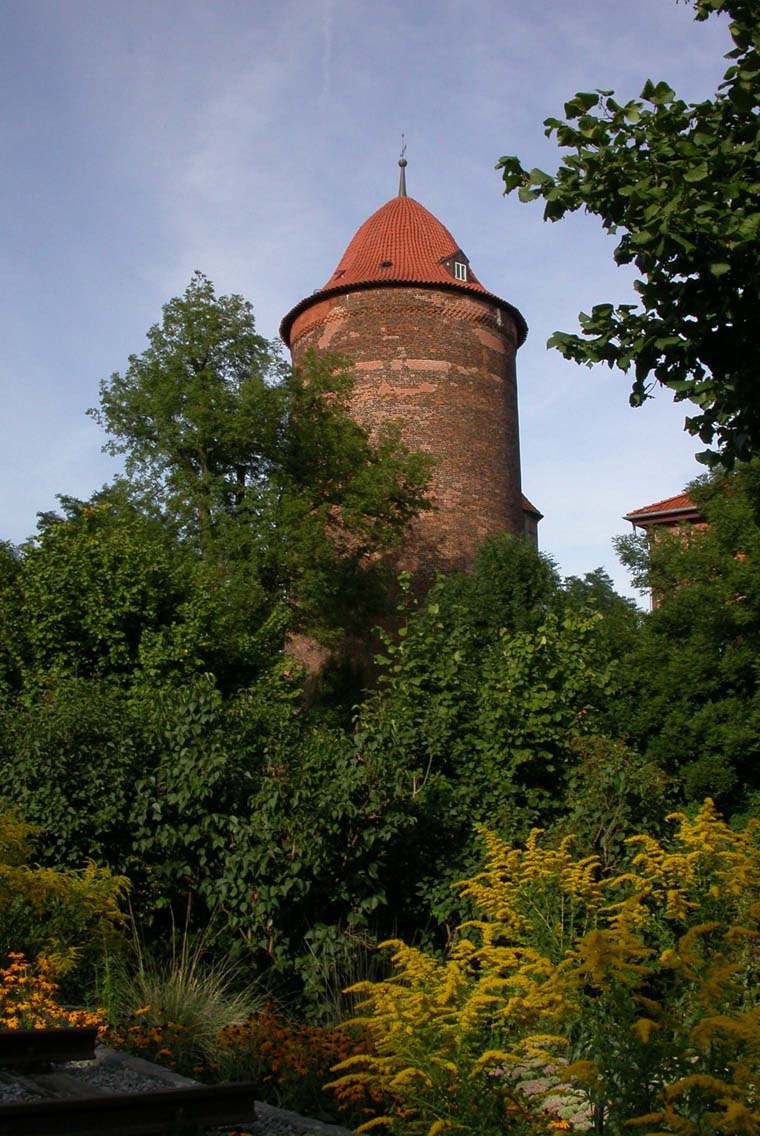
Valdemar Tower in Dannenberg, the only preserved part of the county castle

At that time farmers, craftsmen and artisans settled around the county castle and the village of Dannenberg emerged, although the name Dannenberg had existed previously. From 1223 to 1225 King Valdemar II of Denmark and his son were imprisoned by the count in the castle tower (Valdemar Tower), still preserved today, after Henry of Schwerin had brought them here. In 1303 the last count, Nicholas, ceded the county for an annuity of 40 marks to the Duke of Brunswick and Lüneburg, Otto the Strict. From that time the former county belonged to the Principality of Lüneburg. In 1306 the Dannenberg line died out. At the beginning of the 15th century Dannenberg was split off again as a form of compensation for the new line, but the reigning duke in Celle retained specific sovereign rights.

== Coats of arms ==
The coat of arms of the County of Dannenberg was emblazoned with lions rampart, sometimes separate, sometimes as a facing pair. Sometimes they were also accompanied by a fir tree.

The earliest known county seal that has been preserved shows a right-facing lion rampant and dates to the year 1215. It belonged to Volrad II. Whether this symbol is meant to indicate the relationship of the county to Henry the Lion is not clear. The upright lion is depicted as a charge in all coats of arms, which was constantly changed by the counts to distinguish between themselves. A fir tree as a further figure was added by Adolf I, Count of Dannenberg from 1245. Two facing lions were first depicted in the seal of Bernard II, Count of Dannenberg about 1283–1293.

The symbols of the counts of Dannenberg have been preserved to this day. Lions and fir trees form part of the coats of arms of the town of Dannenberg (Elbe), the former Dannenberg (Elbe) collective municipality and the former district of Dannenberg. The coats of arms of the district of Lüchow-Dannenberg show a fir tree next to the three lozenges of the old County of Lüchow.

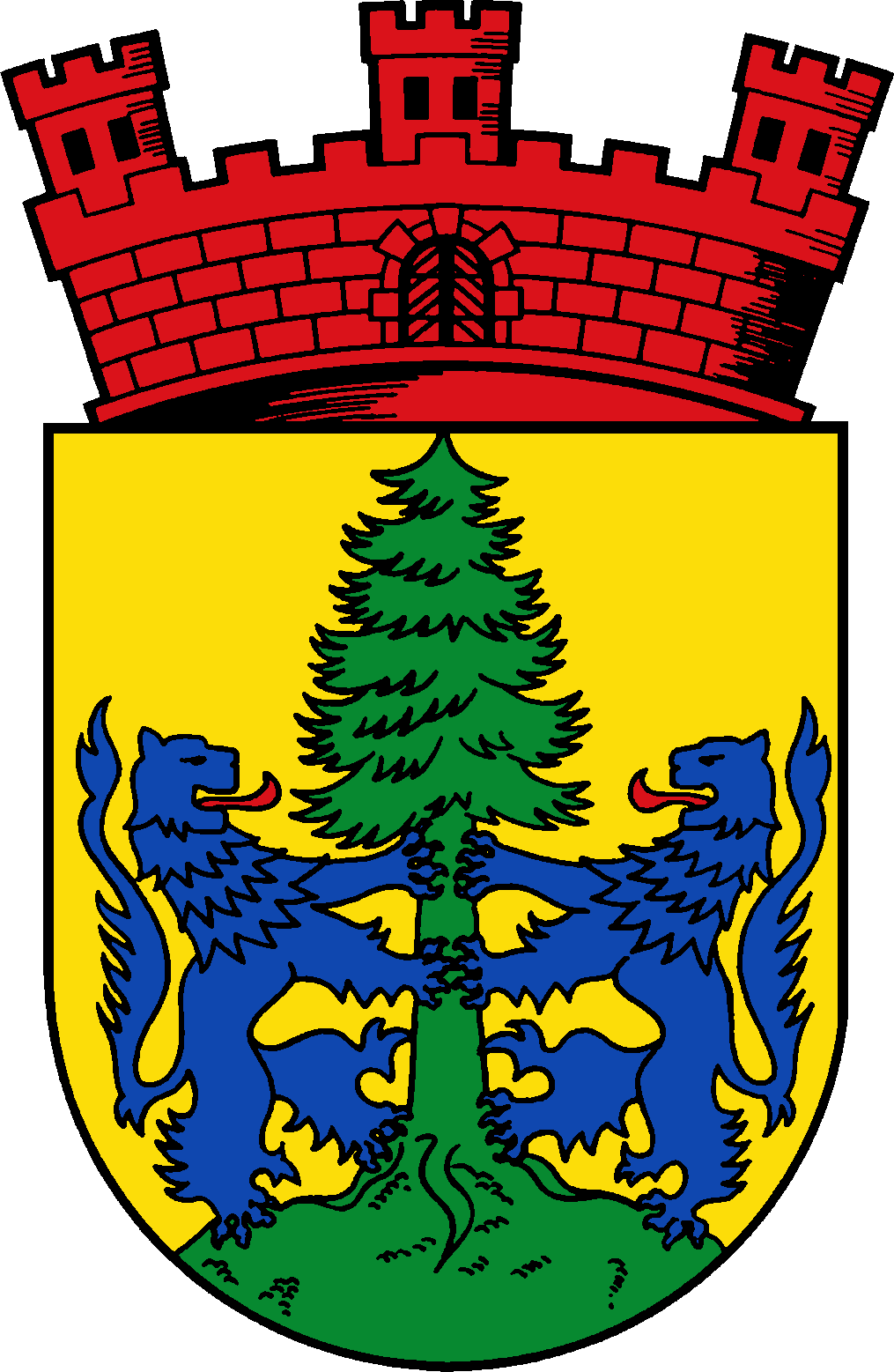
Coat of arms of the town of Dannenberg (Elbe).

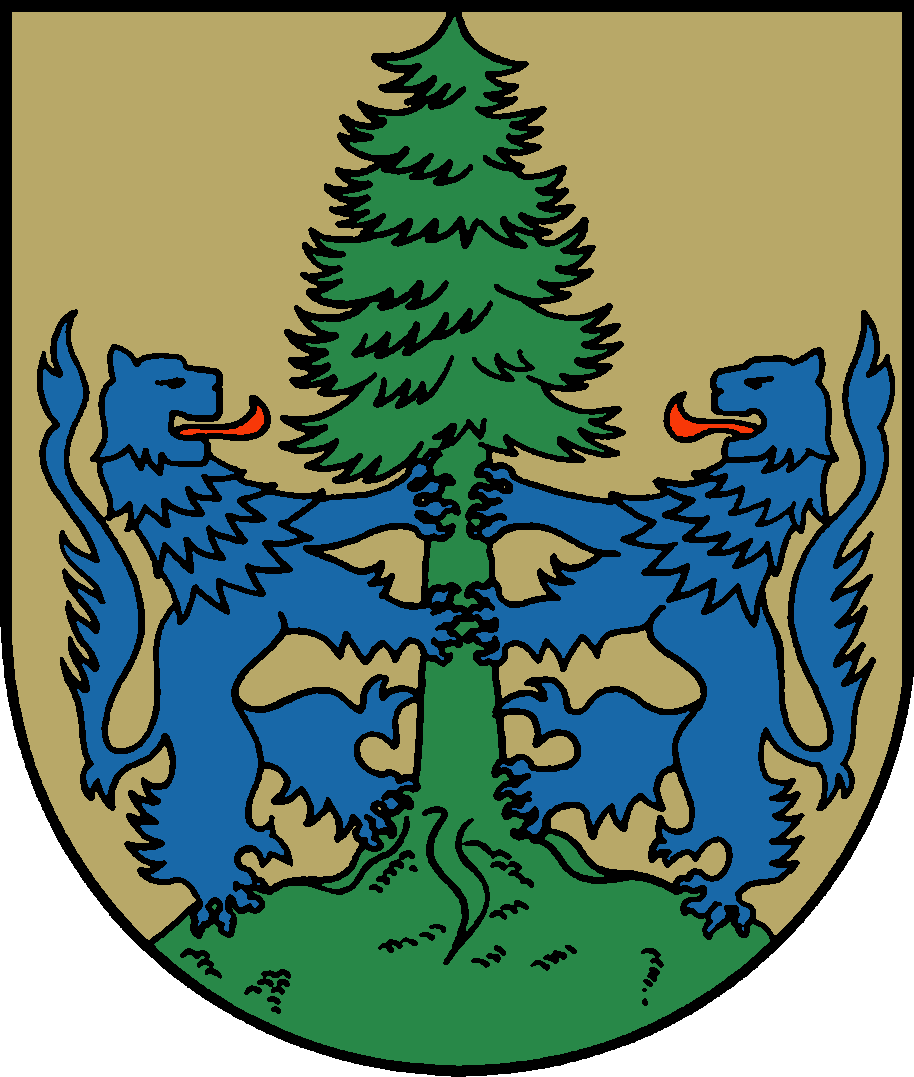
Coat of arms of the former collective municipality of Dannenberg (Elbe).

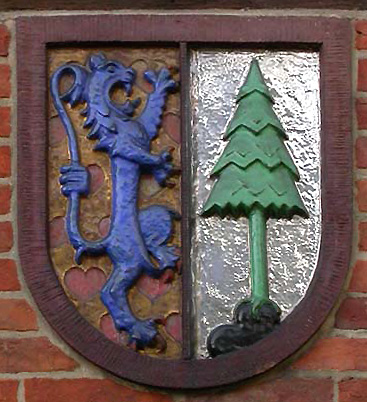
Coat of arms of the former district of Dannenberg.

Coat of arms of the district of Lüchow-Dannenberg.

== Family tree ==
1. Volrad I, from the House of Edler from Salzwedel, brother of Frederick of Salzwedel, first Count of Dannenberg, recorded as Count of Dannenberg 1153–1166, but probably ruled 1145–1169
  1. Henry I, 1169–1209 Count of Dannenberg
    1. Volrad II, probably died in 1226 in battle against Valdemar II near Rendsburg, 1207–1226 Count of Dannenberg; married Jutta of Wölpe, third daughter of Count Bernard II of Wölpe
      1. Henry III, 1233–1237 Count of Dannenberg
    2. Henry II, 1203–1236 Count of Dannenberg; married daughter of Adolf III of Holstein
      1. Bernard I, probably died 1266/67, in 1276 recorded as dead, 1227–1266 Count of Dannenberg; married the Countess of Schwerin
        1. Henry V, died before 1303, also described as Count of Grabow, Count of Dannenberg about 1273–75
        2. Adolf II, died before 1303, also described as Count of Dömitz, Count of Dannenberg about 1273
          1. Volrad IV, last recorded mention 1306
          2. John, died before 1306
          3. son
        3. Bernard II, died before 1303, Count of Dannenberg about 1283–1293
        4. Gunzel
        5. Nicholas, Count of Dannenberg about 1289–1303, last Count of Dannenberg 1303, last recorded mention 1311
        6. daughter; married John Gans zu Putlitz
      2. Adolf I, died 1266/67, 1245–1266 Count of Dannenberg; married Matilda who died about 1259
        1. Volrad III
        2. Frederick, Count of Dannenberg about 1274–1285
        3. Bernard III
        4. daughter; married Helmhold III of Schwerin
        5. Matilda, nun in St. Lorenz Abbey, Magdeburg
        6. daughter
      3. Henry IV, canon
      4. Gerburge
      5. Sophia

== Sources ==
- Meyer, Dr. Wilhelm (1911). Geschichte der Grafen von Ratzeburg und Dannenberg , Schwerin, 1911. In: Jahrbuch des Vereins für Mecklenburgische Geschichte und Altertumskunde . Vol. 76. Bärensprungsche Hofbuchdruckerei, Schwerin, 1911.
- Wachter, Berndt (1983). Aus Dannenberg und seiner Geschichte, 2nd edition, Becker Verlag, Uelzen, 1983.
