= Alexandra Strelchenko =

Russian actress and singer (1937–2019)

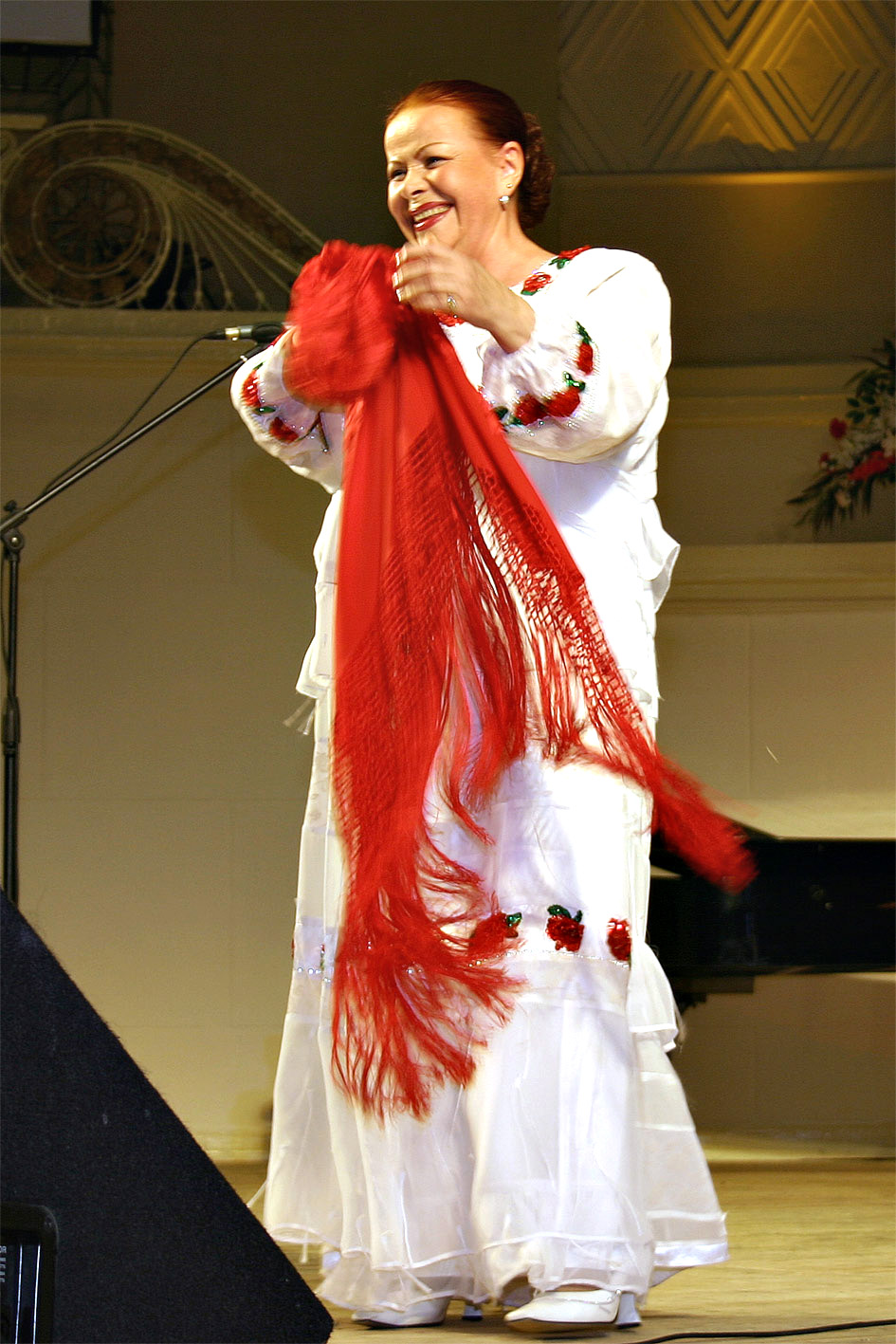
- Strelchenko in 2009
- Born: Alexandra Ilinichna Strelchenko; 2 February 1937; Chaplino, Soviet Union
- Died: 2 August 2019 (aged 82); Moscow
- Occupation: Singer

Alexandra Ilinichna Strelchenko (Russian: Александра Ильинична Стрельченко; 2 February 1937 – 2 August 2019) was a Soviet and Russian actress and singer. She was a performer of Russian folk songs, Russian romances and pop songs. She was awarded the People's Artist of the RSFSR in 1984.

== Biography ==
Strelchenko was born on the station Chaplino in Dnipropetrovsk Region of Ukraine. Her parents were father Ilya (1911–1941), and mother Polina (1916–1945). Alexandra soon became an orphan, as her father died fighting in World War II, and her mother died at the end of the war, and was brought up in an orphanage.

She then studied at Herzen University. During a tour of the Voronezh Folk Choir in 1958, Alexandra, having been at a concert of theirs, decided to leave school and devote herself to a career in music.

From 1959 to 1962 she worked in the Lipetsk Philharmonic. Since 1963, she worked in Moscow, having a one-year internship at the All-Russia creative workshop of variety art.

From 1976 to 1980 she studied at the Gnessin State Musical College. From 2002, she had been a professor at Moscow State Art and Cultural University.
