= 870s =

Decade

The 870s decade ran from January 1, 870, to December 31, 879.

== Events ==
=== 870 ===
==== By place ====
====== Europe ======
- August 8 – Treaty of Meerssen: King Louis the German forces his half-brother Charles the Bald to accept a peace treaty, which partitions the Middle Frankish Kingdom into two larger east and west divisions. Louis receives most of Austrasia (which evolves into the Kingdom of Germany), and Charles receives territory in Lower Burgundy (which evolves into the Kingdom of France). However, large parts of the Frisian coast are under Viking control.
- Charles the Bald marries Richilde of Provence, after the death of his first wife, Ermentrude of Orleans. He intends to secure his rule in Lotharingia through the powerful Bosonid family and the connection to Teutberga, widow-queen of Lothair II.
- Rastislav, ruler (knyaz) of Great Moravia, dies in prison after he is condemned to death for treason, by Louis the German. He is succeeded by his nephew Svatopluk I, who becomes a vassal of the East Frankish Kingdom.
- Bořivoj I, duke of Bohemia, makes Levý Hradec (modern Czech Republic) his residence. Around this time Prague Castle is founded (approximate date).
- Wilfred the Hairy, a Frankish nobleman, becomes count of Urgell and Cerdanya (modern-day Catalonia).

====== Britain ======
- Autumn – The Great Heathen Army, led by Ivar the Boneless and Ubba, invades East Anglia and plunders Peterborough. King Edmund the Martyr is captured, tortured, beaten and used for archery practice (or 869).
- The Danes, led by Ivar the Boneless and King Olaf of the Dublin Vikings, besiege Dumbarton in Scotland, the capital of King Artgal of Stratchlyde. After a siege of four months, the citadel is captured and destroyed.
- The Danes, led by Halfdan Ragnarsson and Bagsecg, invade Wessex and take the royal estate at Reading (Berkshire), which Halfdan makes his headquarters. A naval Viking contingent sails up the Thames River.
- December 31 – Battle of Englefield: The Vikings clash with ealdorman Æthelwulf of Berkshire. The invaders are driven back to Reading; many of the Danes (including one of the earls named Sidrac) are killed.

====== Abbasid Caliphate ======
- January 29 – Anarchy at Samarra: The rebel Salih ibn Wasif is hunted down and killed in Abbasid Samarra by troops of Musa ibn Bugha al-Kabir.
- June 21 – Caliph Al-Muhtadi is deposed and killed by the Turks, after a brief reign. He is succeeded by Al-Mu'tamid (son of the late Al-Mutawakkil) as ruler of the Abbasid Caliphate, who moves his court to Baghdad. End of the Anarchy at Samarra.
- Byzantine–Arab War: A Muslim expeditionary force, led by Halaf al-Hadim, Arab governor of Sicily, conquers Malta. He is welcomed by the local Christian inhabitants as liberator of the agonizing Byzantine yoke. The Muslims sign a treaty with the Christians to live in peace after liberating the island from the Byzantines.
- The Zanj Rebellion: The Zanj (black slaves from East Africa) capture the Abbasid seaport of Al-Ubdullah at the Persian Gulf, and cut off communications with Basra (modern Iraq).

==== By topic ====
====== Religion ======
- February 28 – The Fourth Council of Constantinople ends. The Bulgarians are granted an autocephalous archbishopric. with its seat in the capital of Pliska.

=== 871 ===
==== By place ====
====== Europe ======
- The English retreat onto the Berkshire Downs. The Great Heathen Army, led by the Danish Viking kings Halfdan and Bagsecg, march out after the Saxons. Six pitched battles are fought between the Danes and Wessex. Of two of them the place and date are not recorded, the others are:
  - January 4 – Battle of Reading: A West Saxon force, under the command of King Æthelred I and his brother Alfred, is defeated by the Danes at Reading. Among the many dead on both sides is Æthelwulf. The Saxon troops are forced to retreat, allowing the Vikings to continue their advance into Wessex.
  - January 8 – Battle of Ashdown: The West Saxons, led by Æthelred I and Alfred, gather at the Berkshire Downs. The Danes under the command of Halfdan and Bagsecg occupy the high ground, but are successfully attacked by Alfred's men. During the battle Alfred breaches the shield wall formation.
  - January 22 – Battle of Basing: The West Saxon army, under the command of Æthelred I, is defeated at Basing. The Danes, led by Halfdan, are victorious; Æthelred is forced to flee and regroup, leaving behind precious winter supplies.
- February 2 – Franco-Lombard forces, aided by a Croatian fleet (of Sclaveni), led by Emperor Louis II, capture Bari, capital of the Emirate of Bari in Southern Italy.
  - March 22 – Battle of Meretum: The West Saxons, led by Æthelred I and Alfred, are defeated by the Danes. Among the many dead is Heahmund, bishop of Salisbury.
- April 23 – Alfred succeeds as king of Wessex after Æthelred's death. He makes peace with the Danes, and pays them Danegeld, each ruling parts of England.
  - May – Battle of Wilton: Alfred the Great is defeated by the Danes at Wilton (along the southern side of the River Wylye), leaving him in retreat for several years.
- Alfred makes Winchester his residence. The Danish armies colonize areas of north, central and eastern England, which become known as the Danelaw.
- The Danes sail down the River Thames, to raid the Mercian port of Lundenwic (in the London area). Here, over the winter, they divide their spoils.
- King Rhodri Mawr ("the Great") of Gwynedd annexes Seisyllwg, uniting most of Wales under his rule (approximate date).
- Tønsberg, the oldest surviving town in the Nordic countries, is founded.

====== Arabian Empire ======
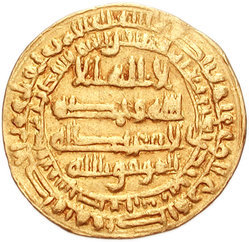
Abbasid Gold dinar under al-Mu'tamid, caliph

- September – Battle of Basra: Zanj rebels in Mesopotamia sack and capture Basra (see Zanj Rebellion).

==== By topic ====
====== Literature ======
- The Cairo Genizah, a collection of Jewish manuscript fragments, is written (approximate date).

=== 872 ===
==== By place ====
====== Europe ======
- Sancho III Mitarra (or Menditarra) becomes the founder and first 'king' of the independent Duchy of Gascony, with loose ties to the Frankish Kingdom.
- May 18 – After his successful campaign against the Saracens, Louis II is crowned as Roman Emperor ("Emperor of the Franks") for the second time and converts the Muwalladun, and the Arab elite.
- 18 July (traditional date) – Battle of Hafrsfjord: Norse chieftain Harald Fairhair wins a great naval victory at Hafrsfjord, outside Stavanger. He becomes (at age 18) the first king of Norway. Harald's conquests and taxation system lead many Viking chiefs and their followers to emigrate to the British Isles, and (later) to Iceland.

====== Britain ======
- Autumn – The Great Heathen Army returns to Northumbria, to put down a rebellion at York. King Ecgberht I and his archbishop, Wulfhere, are expelled by the Northumbrians and flee to Mercia.
- The Danes, led by Halfdan and Guthrum, establish a winter quarter at Torksey in the Kingdom of Lindsey (now part of Lincolnshire). King Burgred pays tribute (Danegeld) in return for 'peace'.
- King Artgal of Strathclyde is slain, through the connivance of King Constantine I of Alba (modern Scotland) and his Viking allies. Artgal's son, Run, succeeds to the Strathclyde throne.

====== Arabian Empire ======
- The Zanj Rebellion: The Zanj (black slaves from East Africa) defeat the Abbasid forces, led by caliphal regent Al-Muwaffaq (brother of caliph Al-Mu'tamid). Hostilities in Mesopotamia (Southern Iraq) will preoccupy Al-Muwaffaq, and the Zanj will remain on the offensive over the next several years.
- In Egypt, the first hospital (bimaristan) is built in Cairo by the Abbasid governor, Ahmad ibn Tulun. Physician licensure becomes mandatory in the Abbasid Caliphate.

====== Japan ======
- Fujiwara no Yoshifusa, Japanese regent (sesshō), dies at his native Kyoto, having ruled since 858. He is succeeded as head of the Fujiwara clan by his son Fujiwara no Mototsune.

==== By topic ====
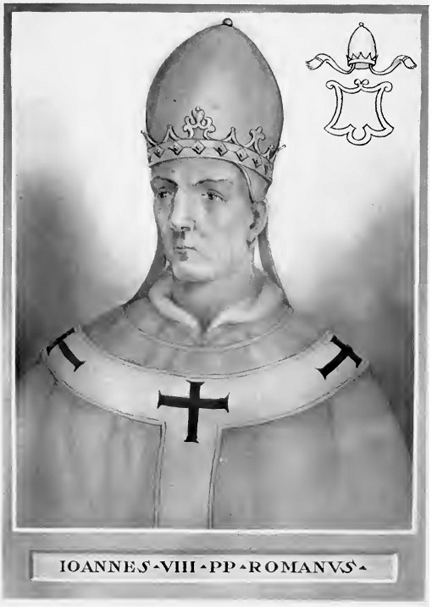
Pope John VIII (872–882)

====== Religion ======
- December 14 – Pope Adrian II dies (at age 80), after a 5-year reign. He is succeeded by John VIII, as the 107th pope of Rome.

=== 873 ===
==== By place ====
====== Europe ======
- Carloman, son of King Charles the Bald, is hauled before a secular court and condemned to death – for plotting against his father. He is blinded, but avoids imprisonment by escaping to the East Frankish Kingdom, where his uncle, Louis the German, gives him protection.
- Al-Andalus: The city of Toledo (modern Spain) rises up for a second time against Umayyad rule, due to ethnic tensions over two years.

====== Britain ======
- The Danish Great Heathen Army, led by the Viking leaders Halfdan and Guthrum, attack Mercia and capture the royal centre at Repton (Derbyshire). The Vikings establish an encampment with a U-shape ditch, on the south bank of the River Trent and spend the winter there.

====== Abbasid Caliphate ======
- Azugitin, Abbasid caliph Al-Mu'tamid appointed Azugitin as governor of Mosul with deputies.
- Muhammad ibn Ali al-Armani, was killed at the Caliphate - Byzantine border in 873.
- Muhammad ibn Tahir, Muslim governor of Khorasan, is overthrown by the Saffarids, led by Ya'qub ibn al-Layth, who conquer the capital, Nishapur. Khorasan is annexed to their own empire in eastern Persia. The Tahirid Dynasty falls.

====== China ======
- August 15 – Emperor Yi Zong (Li Cuī) dies after a 13-year reign. He is succeeded by his 11-year-old son Xi Zong, as ruler of the Tang Dynasty. During his reign, a widespread failure of the agricultural harvest leads to famine (which causes people to resort to cannibalism) and agrarian rebellions.

=== 874 ===
==== By place ====
====== Europe ======
- Salomon, duke ('king') of Brittany, is murdered by a faction which includes his son-in-law Pascweten and Gurvand, son-in-law of late ruler Erispoe. After Salomon's death they divide the country, and Pascweten and Gurvand co-rule Brittany.
- Svatopluk I, ruler (knyaz) of Great Moravia, concludes a peace treaty at Forchheim (Northern Bavaria). He is able to expand his territories outside the Frankish sphere, and subjugates the Vistulans.
- Ingólfr Arnarson arrives from Norway, as the first permanent Viking settler in Iceland. He builds his homestead and founds Reykjavík. The settlement of Iceland begins (approximate date).

====== Britain ======
- The Danish Vikings (from their base at Repton) drive King Burgred of Mercia into exile, and sack Tamworth. They conquer his kingdom and install his political opponent, Ceolwulf II, as sub-king.
- Autumn – The Great Heathen Army splits into two bands; Halfdan returns with his forces to Northumbria, along with his brother Ubba, where he establishes a new base on the River Tyne.
- Amlaíb Conung, the first Norse 'king' of Dublin, is killed in Scotland, during a campaign against his rival Constantin I (approximate date).
- November – Frost begins in Scotland, and lasts until April 875.

====== China ======
- Huang Chao, a salt privateer, joins forces with Wang Xianzhi to raise a rebel army at Changyuan (modern Xinxiang). The uprising further weakens the Tang dynasty, which is already weakened by natural disasters such as severe droughts and floods.

==== By topic ====
====== Religion ======
- March 13 – The remains of Saint Nikephorus I are interred in the Church of the Holy Apostles, in Constantinople.
- The monastery of Sevanavank, located on the shore of Lake Sevan (Armenia), is founded.
- Muhammad al-Mahdi, the child of the eleventh Shi'i Twelver Imam Hasan al-Askari, begins his Imamate. His first period of occultation, known as the Minor Occultation, also begins (ends 941 CE).

=== 875 ===
==== By place ====
====== Europe ======
- August 12 – Emperor Louis II dies in Brescia, after having named his cousin Carloman, son of King Louis the German, as his successor. Louis is buried in the Basilica of Sant'Ambrogio in Milan.
- December 29 – King Charles the Bald, supported by Pope John VIII, travels to Italy. He receives the Imperial Regalia at Pavia, and is crowned Holy Roman Emperor as Charles II at Rome.
- Louis the Stammerer, son of Charles the Bald, marries for the second time Adelaide of Paris, after divorcing Ansgarde of Burgundy, with whom he is secretly married.
- King Harald Fairhair of Norway subdues the rovers on the Orkney Islands and Shetland Islands, and adds them to his kingdom (approximate date).

====== Britain ======
- June – The Great Heathen Army, led by Guthrum, moves on Cambridge. He later returns to Wessex, to establish a winter quarter. King Alfred the Great fights the Danes in a naval engagement.
- Battle of Dollar: Invading Danish Vikings defeat the Scots and the Picts, under King Constantine I, at Dollar. They occupy Caithness, Sutherland, Ross and Moray, far to the north.
- Danish Vikings, probably led by Halfdan Ragnarsson, invade Dublin. During the fighting, Eystein Olafsson, king of Dublin, is killed.
- Donyarth, the last recorded king of Cornwall, drowns in what is thought to be the River Fowey.

====== Arabian Empire ======
- Fall – An Arab fleet from Taranto sails up the Adriatic Sea and sacks Comacchio, putting it to flames. They attack Grado (bishopric of the Venetian Republic), but are repelled by the Venetians.
- Muhammad II, emir of the Aghlabids, dies and is succeeded by his brother Ibrahim II. Towards the end of his reign, a caravan of pilgrims from Mecca introduces the plague in Ifriqiya (Tunisia).
- The Samanid Dynasty establishes a court at Bukhara (modern Uzbekistan), which becomes a rival city to Baghdad on the strategic Silk Road.

====== Asia ======
- King Jayavarman III founds a new dynasty at Indrapura (Quảng Nam) in Champa, in the central region of modern-day Vietnam. He initiates a building program in the Dong Duong Style.

==== By topic ====
====== Religion ======
- The construction of the Great Mosque of Kairouan is completed by Ibrahim II. He builds another three bays, reducing the size of the courtyard.
- Bretons begin to flee the land, seeking the relative security of Britain. Vikings loot the Abbey of Saint-Melaine at Rennes (approximate date).

=== 876 ===
==== By place ====
====== Byzantine Empire ======
- At the invitation of Benevento, the newly-restored Byzantine fleet appears in the waters off Otranto. On the orders of Emperor Basil I, the Byzantines sail up the Adriatic Sea and reconquer part of southern Italy. The city of Bari is occupied in the name of the Byzantine Empire. Instead of holding it for his 'ally' Adelchis of Benevento, Basil makes it the capital of the new Byzantine Theme of Longobardia.

====== Europe ======
- August 28 – King Louis the German dies at Frankfurt, while preparing for war against his brother Charles II ("the Bald"), ruler of the Holy Roman Empire. The East Frankish Kingdom is divided among his three sons: Carloman receives Bavaria and styles himself "King of Bavaria". Louis the Younger receives Saxony (with Franconia and Thuringia), and Charles the Fat receives Swabia (with Raetia).
- October 8 – Battle of Andernach: Frankish forces, led by Louis the Younger, prevent a West Frankish invasion and defeat Charles II at Andernach. The Rhineland remains part of the East Frankish Kingdom.

====== Britain ======
- The Great Heathen Army, led by Guthrum, captures the fortress of Wareham (Dorset), and is met by a Viking army (3,500 men) from the sea, which lands at Poole Harbour. King Alfred the Great traps the Vikings, and demands hostages in return for a peace agreement. The Danes divide their forces; half flees to Exeter, where they besiege the town while the other half escape in their ships, but are lost in a storm near Swanage.
- Viking leader Halfdan Ragnarsson formally establishes the Danish kingdom of York, after the removal of the puppet king Ricsige of Northumbria, and becomes the first monarch.

====== Arabian Empire ======
- April 8 – Battle of Dayr al-'Aqul: Abbasid forces, led by Al-Muwaffaq, halt a Saffarid invasion on the River Tigris. Emir Ya'qub ibn al-Layth tries to capture the Abbasid Caliphate's capital of Baghdad, but he is forced, with his army, to retreat.

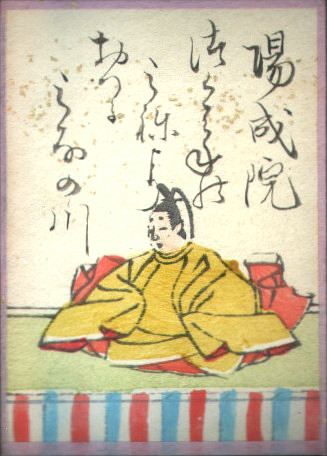
Emperor Yōzei (869–949)

====== Japan ======
- Emperor Seiwa abdicates the throne, in favor of his 7-year-old son Yōzei. Seiwa becomes a Buddhist priest; he appoints Fujiwara no Mototsune as regent (sesshō), who assists the child emperor.

==== By topic ====
====== Religion ======
- June – Synod of Ponthion: Charles II summons a council, in which a papal brief is read from Pope John VIII. He appoints Ansegisus as papal legate and primate over Gaul, in the West Frankish Kingdom.
- John VIII travels throughout Campania, in an effort to form an alliance among the southern Italian states (the cities of Salerno, Capua, Naples, Gaeta and Amalfi) against Muslim raids.

=== 877 ===
==== By place ====
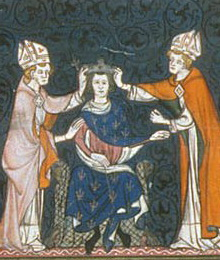
Coronation of Louis the Stammerer

====== Europe ======
- Summer – King Charles II ("the Bald") sets out for Italy, accompanied by his wife Richilde and a number of his chief vassals. He gives orders for an expedition, but Duke Boso (his brother-in-law) refuses to join the army. At the same time Carloman, son of Louis the German, has crossed the Alps into eastern Lombardy at the head of a Frankish army. Charles sends Richilde back to Gaul, for the coronation as empress of the Holy Roman Empire, and with orders for reinforcements. However, the Frankish aristocracy is more concerned with the attacks by the Vikings in their country, than the war with the Saracens in southern Italy. Pope John VIII receives Charles at Vercelli, where he requests help against the attacks by the Saracens in southern Italy. He forms an alliance with the Italian states at Traetto.
- August – Siege of Syracuse: The Aghlabids begin raiding the Byzantine territories, in the east of the island of Sicily. They besiege Syracuse, and blockade the fortress city by sea and land.
- October 6 – Charles II dies while crossing the pass of Mont Cenis at Brides-les-Bains, en route back to Gaul. He is succeeded by his son Louis the Stammerer, king of Aquitaine, who becomes ruler of the West Frankish Kingdom. Carloman, forced by an epidemic which breaks out in his army, returns to Germany. After the death of his father, Louis makes plans to receive the oath of fidelity from his subjects, but he learns that the magnates are refusing him obedience and rallying around Boso. The rebels are supported by his stepmother Richilda, and, as a sign of their displeasure, ravage the country. Hincmar, archbishop of Reims, intercedes and the rebels agree to a settlement. The magnates, whose rights Louis promises to recognize, all make their submissions.
- December 8 – Louis the Stammerer is crowned by Hincmar as king (not emperor) of the West Frankish Kingdom, in the church of Compiègne. The imperial throne will remain vacant until 881.

====== Britain ======
- Autumn – King Alfred the Great raises a large force, and marches on the Viking camp at the city of Exeter. His army besieges the Great Summer Army, led by Guthrum, and forces the Vikings to surrender. They flee north to Gloucester, and settle in the Five Boroughs (modern East Midlands).
- Battle of Strangford Lough: King Halfdan I leaves for Ireland, in an attempt to claim the Kingdom of Dublin from his rival Bárid mac Ímair. He is killed in battle at Strangford Lough, and a probable interregnum follows in York.
- Ceolwulf II is installed as puppet king of Mercia. The west of the kingdom comes under Ceolwulf's rule, while in the east the Five Boroughs begin as fortified Danish burhs.
- The Vikings invade Wales once more, and King Rhodri ap Merfyn ("the Great") of Gwynedd, Powys and Seisyllwg is forced to flee to Ireland (approximate date).
- King Constantin I is killed fighting Viking raiders, at the "Black Cave" in Fife. He is succeeded by his brother Áed mac Cináeda as ruler of Alba (Scotland).

====== Asia ======
- King Jayavarman III dies after a 42-year reign. He is succeeded by his cousin Indravarman I, as ruler of the Khmer Empire (modern Cambodia).

==== By topic ====
====== Religion ======
- October 23 – Photius I is reinstated as patriarch of Constantinople, after the death of Ignatius.

=== 878 ===
==== By place ====
====== Europe ======
- March–April – Wilfred the Hairy (ruler of the Catalan counties) with other supporters of Louis the Stammerer (King of West Francia) defeat noble supporters of the rebel Bernard of Gothia.
- September 11 – Bernard of Gothia is dispossessed of his titles by Louis.

====== Britain ======
- January 6 – Battle of Chippenham: King Alfred the Great of Wessex is surprised by a Viking attack at Chippenham in Wiltshire. He is forced to flee, with his retinue, into the Somerset Levels for safety. From his headquarters at Athelney, Alfred wages guerrilla warfare against the Vikings.
- May – Battle of Edington: Supported by all the levies of Somerset, Wiltshire and Hampshire, Alfred the Great decisively defeats the main body of Danish Vikings, led by King Guthrum, at modern-day Edington, Wiltshire (near Bratton Castle).
- Treaty of Wedmore: Guthrum agrees to a peace treaty and is baptised, taking the name of Aethelstan. England is divided between Wessex in the south, and the Vikings in the Danelaw up north. Guthrum returns to East Anglia.
- Battle of Cynwit: Viking raiders, led by Ubba Ragnarsson, land on the coast at Combwich with 23 ships, and besiege a hillfort (called Cynwit) at Cannington, Somerset. Ealdorman Odda launches a surprise attack, and kills Ubba in battle.
- King Rhodri the Great of Gwynedd, Powys and Seisyllwg, returns to his kingdoms, but is killed fighting the Mercians of King Ceolwulf II. His kingdoms are divided amongst his three sons: Anarawd, Merfyn and Cadell.
- King Áed mac Cináeda of Scotland is killed in battle, by his rival Giric mac Dúngal. Giric becomes king of the Picts, and allies himself with Eochaid (grandson of Kenneth I). The two rule all of Alba (Scotland) together as joint-kings.

====== Arabian Empire ======
- May 21 – Siege of Syracuse: The Aghlabids capture the Byzantine fortress city of Syracuse, after a nine-month siege. Most of the population is massacred by the Arabs.
- Zanj Rebellion: The Zanj (black slaves from East Africa) in Mesopotamia seize Wasit (modern Iraq), and establish a presence in the Persian province of Khuzestan.
- Reconquista: King Alfonso III of Asturias conquers the city of Coimbra (modern Portugal), which is under the Umayyad Caliphate.

==== By topic ====
====== Religion ======
- April 16 – The city of Belgrade is first mentioned in a papal letter to Boris I, ruler (khan) of the Bulgarian Empire.
- September 7 – Pope John VIII crowns Louis the Stammerer as king of the West Frankish Kingdom, in the cathedral at Troyes.
- Poorna, the illegitimate grand-daughter of Shankara, unifies all of his teaching in the Upadeśasāhasrī.
- The excommunication of Formosus is lifted, after he has promised never to return to Rome. He will become Pope in 891.

=== 879 ===
==== By place ====
====== Europe ======
- April 10 – King Louis the Stammerer dies at Compiègne, after a reign of 18 months. He is succeeded by his two sons, Louis III and Carloman II. They are crowned at Ferrières Abbey, and rule the West Frankish Kingdom together as joint-kings.
- Baldwin I ("Iron Arm") dies, after 15 years as margrave of Flanders. He is buried in the Abbey of Saint Bertin (near Saint-Omer), and is succeeded by his son Baldwin II.
- Oleg, brother-in-law of the Varangian ruler Rurik, is entrusted to take care of his kingdom Novgorod after his death. He becomes regent of his son Igor.
- King Charles the Fat becomes ruler of the Kingdom of Italy, after the abdication of his brother Carloman of Bavaria, who has been incapacitated by a stroke.

====== Britain ======
- King Alfred the Great establishes a series of fortified villages (or burhs) to protect Wessex against Viking raids. He creates a standing army to defend the strategic ports, and builds a network of well-maintained army roads (known as herepaths).
- Viking leader Guthrum becomes 'king' of East Anglia. A Viking fleet sails up the River Thames, and builds a camp at Fulham (near London) to prepare for an invasion of France.

====== Arabian Empire ======
- Zanj Rebellion: The Abbasid Caliphate concentrates its efforts against the Zanj rebels in Mesopotamia. The Abbasid general Al-Mu'tadid leads an expeditionary force (10,000 men) to suppress the revolt. This marks the turning-point of the war.

====== Asia ======
- Guangzhou Massacre: The Chinese rebel leader Huang Chao besieges the seaport in Guangzhou, and slaughters many of its inhabitants and foreign merchants. According to sources, the death toll ranges from 120,000 to 200,000 foreigners.

==== By topic ====
====== Religion ======
- Fourth Council of Constantinople: Emperor Basil I calls for a synod, and reinstates Photius I as patriarch of Constantinople.
- June 7 – Pope John VIII recognizes the Duchy of Croatia, under Duke (knyaz) Branimir, as an independent state.
- Wilfred the Hairy, count of Barcelona, founds the Benedictine monastery at Ripoll, in Catalonia (Spain).

== Significant people ==
- Alfred the Great
- Al-Mu'tamid
- Al-Muwaffaq
- Harald I of Norway
- Rhodri Mawr (the Great)
- Charles the Bald
- Rurik

== Births ==
870

- Æthelflæd, lady ruler of Mercia (d. 918)
- Alexander III, Byzantine emperor (d. 913)
- Bernard, illegitimate son of Charles the Fat (d. 891)
- Ebalus, duke of Aquitaine (approximate date)
- Ermengol, Frankish nobleman (d. 937)
- Fulk I, Frankish nobleman (approximate date)
- Lde-dpal-hkhor-btsan, Indian ruler (approximate date)
- Pavle, prince of Serbia (approximate date)
- Petar, prince of Serbia (approximate date)
- Romanos I, Byzantine emperor (d. 948)
- Sunifred II, count of Urgell (approximate date)
- Sunyer, count of Barcelona (approximate date)
- Theodora, Roman politician (approximate date)
- Wang Dingbao, Chinese chancellor (d. 941)
- Zhu Yanshou, Chinese governor (d. 903)
- Zwentibold, king of Lotharingia (d. 900)

871

- Abu Bakr Muhammad ibn Ali al-Madhara'i, Tulunid vizier (d. 957)
- Fujiwara no Tokihira, Japanese statesman (d. 909)
- García I, king of León (approximate date)
- Li Qi, chancellor of Later Liang (d. 930)
- Wang Jianli, Chinese general (d. 940)

872

- Abaoji, ruler (khagan) of the Khitan Empire (d. 926)
- Al-Farabi, Muslim philosopher (approximate date)
- Huo Yanwei, Chinese general (d. 928)
- Ibn Durustawayh, Persian grammarian, lexicographer and student of the Quran and hadith (d. 958)
- Ki no Tsurayuki, Japanese writer and poet (d. 945)
- Pietro II Candiano, doge of Venice (approximate date)

873

- Abdullah al-Mahdi Billah, was the founder of the Isma'ili Fatimid Empire, the only major Shi'a caliphate in the 10th century history, and the eleventh Imam of the Isma'ili faith (d. 934)
- Abu Yazid, Kharijite Berber leader (d. 947)
- Ahmad al-Muhajir, Muslim imam (d. 956)
- Al-Tabarani, Muslim hadith scholar (d. 970)
- Fujiwara no Sadakata, Japanese poet (d. 932)
- Ordoño II, king of Galicia and León (d. 924)

874

- May 10 – Meng Zhixiang, general of Later Tang (d. 934)
- Abu al-Hasan al-Ash'ari, Muslim scholar (d. 936)
- Edward the Elder, king of Wessex (approximate date)
- Constantine II, king of Scotland (approximate date)
- Liu Yin, governor (jiedushi) of Southern Han (d. 911)
- Lothar II, Frankish nobleman (d. 929)
- Ota, Frankish queen and Holy Roman Empress (approximate date)
- Wang Shifan, Chinese warlord (d. 908)

875

- March 22 – William I, duke of Aquitaine (d. 918)
- Adalbert II, Frankish margrave (approximate date)
- Ermentrude, Frankish princess, daughter of Louis the Stammerer (or 878)
- Fruela II, king of Asturias and León (approximate date)
- Fujiwara no Nakahira, Japanese statesman (d. 945)
- Gerhard I, Frankish nobleman (approximate date)
- Lady Ise, Japanese poet (approximate date)
- Mary the Younger, Byzantine saint (d. 902)
- Sale Ngahkwe, king of Burma (approximate date)
- Spytihněv I, duke of Bohemia (approximate date)
- Sueiro Belfaguer, Portuguese nobleman (d. 925)

876

- Eutychius, patriarch of Alexandria (d. 940)
- Henry the Fowler, king of Germany (d. 936)
- John of Rila, Bulgarian hermit (approximate date)
- Lu Wenji, Chinese chancellor (d. 951)
- Toda, queen of Pamplona (d. 958)

877

- January 31 – Wang Kon, founder of Goryeo (d. 943)
- September 10 – Eutychius, patriarch of Alexandria (d. 940)
- Ælfthryth, English princess and countess of Flanders (d. 929)
- Fujiwara no Kanesuke, Japanese nobleman (d. 933)
- Liu, Chinese empress of Qi (d. 943)
- Luo Shaowei, Chinese warlord (d. 910)
- Pi Guangye, Chinese chancellor (d. 943)
- Rudesind I, bishop of Mondoñedo (d. 907)
- Wang Rong, Chinese warlord (d. 921)

878

- Bardas Phokas the Elder, Byzantine general (d. 968)
- Ermentrude of France, daughter of Louis the Stammerer (or 875)
- Krishna II, king of Rashtrakuta (India) (d. 914)
- Miró II of Cerdanya, Frankish nobleman (approximate date)
- Odo of Cluny, Frankish abbot (approximate date)

879

- September 17 – Charles the Simple, king of the West Frankish Kingdom (d. 929)
- October 19 – Yingtian, empress of the Khitan Liao Dynasty (d. 953)

== Deaths ==
870

- January 29 – Salih ibn Wasif, Muslim general
- February 4 – Ceolnoth, archbishop of Canterbury
- April 2 – Æbbe the Younger, Frankish abbess
- June 21 – Al-Muhtadi, Muslim caliph
- September 1 – Muhammad al-Bukhari, Persian scholar (b. 810)
- November 20 – Edmund the Martyr, king of East Anglia (or 869)
- December 4 – Suairlech ind Eidnén mac Ciaráin, Irish bishop
- December 27 – Aeneas of Paris, Frankish bishop
- Adarnase II, Georgian Bagratid prince (approximate date)
- Al-Harith ibn Sima al-Sharabi, Muslim governor
- Al-Zubayr ibn Bakkar, Muslim historian (b. 788)
- Caesar of Naples ("the Brave"), Italian admiral
- Gregory III, co-regent and duke of Naples
- He Quanhao, general of the Tang Dynasty (b. 839)
- Neot, English monk and saint (approximate date)
- Rastislav, ruler (knyaz) of Great Moravia
- Ratramnus, Frankish monk and abbot (approximate date)
- Wen Tingyun, Chinese poet and lyricist (b. 812)

871

- January 4 – Æthelwulf, Saxon ealdorman
- January 8 – Bagsecg, Viking king
- April 23 – Æthelred I, king of Wessex
- June 10 – Odo I, Frankish nobleman
- Ailill mac Dúnlainge, king of Leinster
- Cathalán mac Indrechtaig, king of Ulaid
- Dae Geonhwang, king of Balhae
- Engelschalk I, Frankish margrave
- Fadl Ashsha'ira, Abbasid female poet
- Heahmund, bishop of Salisbury
- Hunfrid, bishop of Thérouanne
- Ibn 'Abd al-Hakam, Muslim historian (b. 803)
- Solomon I, bishop of Constance
- Uathmharan mac Brocan, king of Aidhne (Ireland)
- William II, Frankish margrave
- Yahya ibn Mu'adh al-Razi, Muslim Sufi (b. 830)

872

- April 2 – Muflih al-Turki, Abbasid general
- December 14 – Adrian II, pope of Rome (b. 792)
- Artgal, king of Strathclyde (Scotland)
- Athanasius I, bishop of Naples (b. 830)
- Cenn Fáelad hua Mugthigirn, king of Munster (Ireland)
- Chrysocheir, leader of the Paulicians (or 878)
- Fujiwara no Yoshifusa, Japanese regent (b. 804)
- Ibrahim ibn Ya'qub al-Juzajani, Muslim hadith scholar
- Ivar the Boneless, Viking chief (approximate date)
- Sargis, patriarch of the Church of the East
- Zhang Yichao, general of the Tang Dynasty (b. 785)

873

- July 8 – Gunther, archbishop of Cologne
- August 1 – Thachulf, duke of Thuringia
- August 15 – Yi Zong, emperor of the Tang Dynasty (b. 833)

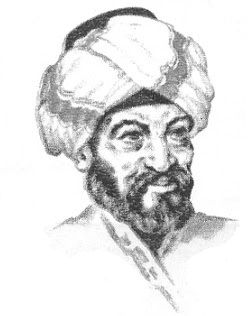
Death of Al-Kindi. He was an Arab Muslim philosopher, polymath, mathematician, physician and musician. Al-Kindi was the first of the Islamic peripatetic philosophers, and is hailed as the "father of Arab philosophy

- Al-Kindi, Muslim philosopher and polymath
- Du Cong, chancellor of the Tang Dynasty (b. 794)
- Ecgberht I, king of Northumbria
- Hunayn ibn Ishaq, Muslim scholar and physician (b. 809)
- Ivar the Boneless, Viking leader (approximate date)
- John III, Syriac Orthodox patriarch of Antioch
- Kang Chengxun, general of the Tang Dynasty
- Lethlobar mac Loingsig, king of Ulaid (Ireland)
- Malik ibn Tawk, Muslim governor
- Muhammad ibn Ali al-Armani, Muslim general
- Rodrigo, Asturian nobleman
- Rodulf Haraldsson, Viking leader
- Shinshō, Japanese Buddhist monk (b. 797)
- Vímara Peres, Asturian nobleman
- Wei Baoheng, chancellor of the Tang Dynasty

874

- January 4 – Hasan al-Askari, 11th Shia Imam (b. 846)
- August 15 – Altfrid, bishop of Hildesheim
- December 16 – Ado, archbishop of Vienne
- Amlaíb Conung, Viking leader (approximate date)
- Bayazid Bastami, Persian Sufi (approximate date)
- Han Yunzhong, general of the Tang dynasty (b. 814)
- Liu Zhan, chancellor of the Tang dynasty
- Lu Yan, chancellor of the Tang dynasty (b. 829)
- Pei Tan, chancellor of the Tang dynasty
- Salomon, duke ('king') of Brittany
- Unruoch III, margrave of Friuli

875

- August 12 – Louis II, king of Italy and Holy Roman Emperor (b. 825)
- October 28 – Remigius of Lyon, Frankish archbishop
- November 11 – Teutberga, queen of Lotharingia
- 'Abdallah ibn Muhammad ibn Yazdad al-Marwazi, Persian official
- Amram Gaon, Jewish liturgist (approximate date)
- Donyarth, king of Cornwall (approximate date)
- Gyeongmun, king of Silla (Korea) (b. 841)
- Eystein Olafsson, Norse–Gael king of Dublin
- Martianus Hiberniensis, Irish monk and calligrapher (b. 819)
- Muhammad II, emir of the Aghlabids
- Muslim ibn al-Hajjaj, Persian scholar
- Xiao Fang, chancellor of the Tang Dynasty (b. 796)

876

- January 31 – Hemma of Altdorf, Frankish queen
- August 28 – Louis the German, king of the East Frankish Kingdom
- Bagrat I, prince of Iberia (Georgia)
- Bodo, Frankish deacon
- Conrad I, Frankish nobleman
- Conrad II, Frankish nobleman
- Domagoj, duke (knyaz) of Croatia
- Donatus of Fiesole, Irish bishop
- Gurvand, duke ('king') of Brittany
- Heiric of Auxerre, Frankish theologian and writer (b. 841)
- Hessel Hermana, Frisian governor (approximate date)
- Pascweten, duke ('king') of Brittany
- Pyinbya, king of Burma (b. 817)
- Raganar, Frankish nobleman
- Wulfad, Frankish archbishop

877

- August 5 – Ubayd Allah ibn Yahya ibn Khaqan, Abbasid vizier
- October 6 – Charles the Bald, Holy Roman emperor (b. 823)
- October 23 – Ignatius, patriarch of Constantinople
- Andrew the Scot, Irish archdeacon (approximate date)
- Bernard II, Frankish nobleman (approximate date)
- Carloman, Frankish abbot (approximate date)
- Constantine I, king of Alba (Scotland)
- Engelram, Frankish chamberlain
- Gérard II, Frankish nobleman (or 879)
- Halfdan Ragnarsson, Viking leader and 'king' of Northumbria
- Jayavarman III, king of the Khmer Empire (Cambodia)
- Johannes Scotus Eriugena, Irish theologian (approximate date)
- Musa ibn Bugha al-Kabir, Abbasid general
- Ōe no Otondo, Japanese scholar (b. 811)
- Savaric I, bishop of Mondoñedo (b. 866)
- Wang Ying, Chinese rebel leader

878

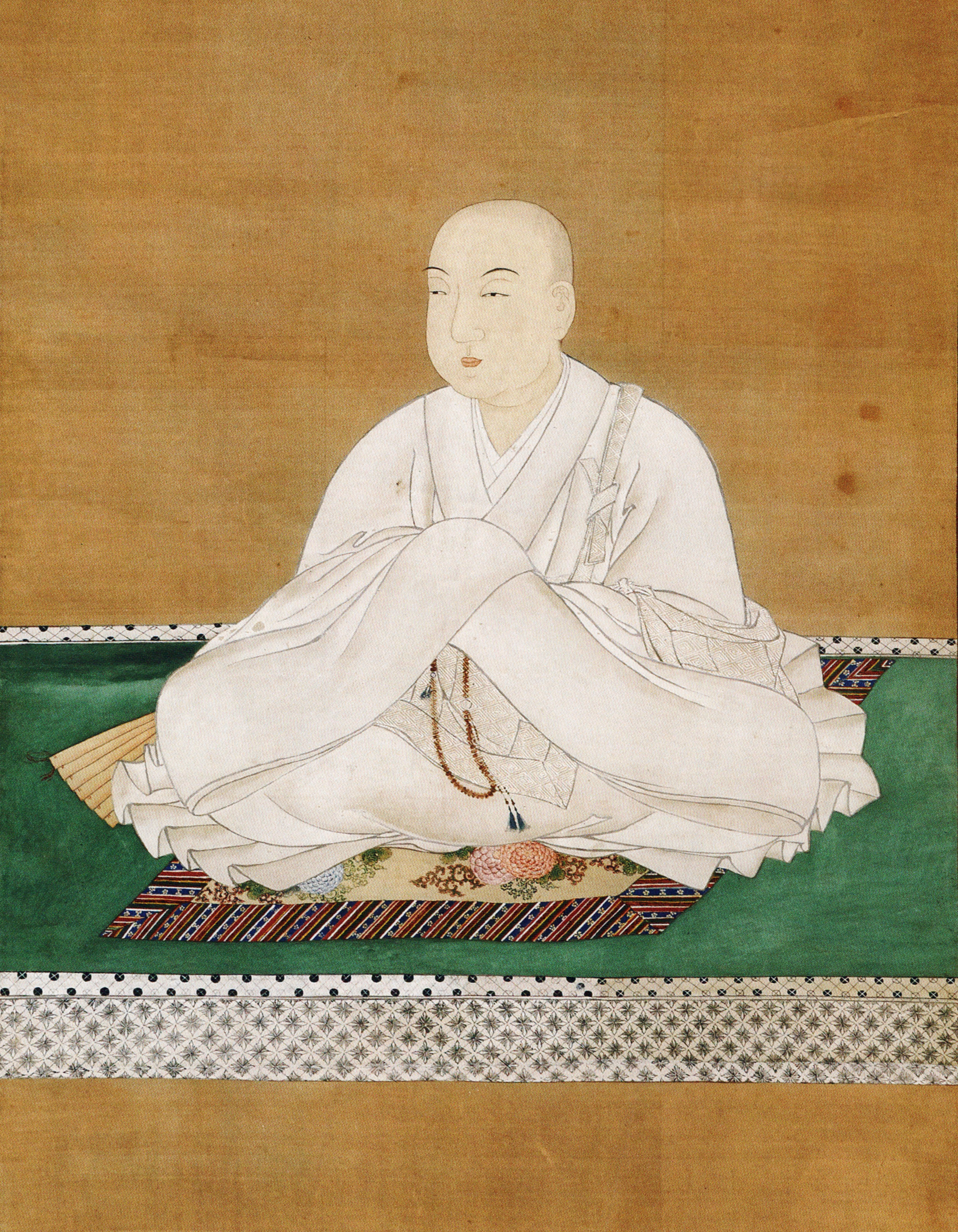
Emperor Seiwa

- Abu Zur'a al-Razi, Muslim scholar
- Áed mac Cináeda, king of Alba (Scotland)
- Adelchis, prince of Benevento
- Amoghavarsha I, king of Rashtrakuta (b. 800)
- Anastasius Bibliothecarius, antipope of Rome (approximate date)
- Gauzfrid, Count of Maine, Frankish nobleman
- Iljko, duke (knyaz) of Croatia
- Rhodri the Great, king of Wales
- Run of Alt Clut, king of Strathclyde (approximate date)
- Ubba Ragnarsson, Viking chieftain
- Wang Xianzhi, Chinese rebel leader

879

- April 10 – Louis the Stammerer, king of the West Frankish Kingdom (b. 846)
- April 18 – Seishi, empress of Japan (b. 810)
- June 5 – Ya'qub ibn al-Layth, founder of the Saffarid Dynasty (b. 840)
- Abi'l-Saj Devdad, Sogdian prince
- Áed Findliath, high king of Ireland
- Ahmad ibn al-Khasib al-Jarjara'i, Muslim vizier
- Ansegisus, archbishop of Sens (or 883)
- Baldwin I, margrave of Flanders
- Ceolwulf II, king of Mercia (approximate date)
- Cormac mac Ciaran, Irish abbot
- Gebhard, Frankish nobleman
- Gérard II, Frankish nobleman (or 877)
- Hincmar, Frankish bishop
- Landulf II, bishop and count of Capua
- Li Wei, chancellor of the Tang Dynasty
- Rurik, prince of Novgorod
- Sulayman ibn Abdallah, Muslim governor
- Suppo II, duke of Spoleto (approximate date)
- Zdeslav, duke (knyaz) of Croatia
