= 875 =

Calendar year

875 in various calendars
- Gregorian calendar: 875; DCCCLXXV
- Ab urbe condita: 1628
- Armenian calendar: 324; ԹՎ ՅԻԴ
- Assyrian calendar: 5625
- Balinese saka calendar: 796–797
- Bengali calendar: 281–282
- Berber calendar: 1825
- Buddhist calendar: 1419
- Burmese calendar: 237
- Byzantine calendar: 6383–6384
- Chinese calendar: 甲午年 (Wood Horse); 3572 or 3365 — to — 乙未年 (Wood Goat); 3573 or 3366
- Coptic calendar: 591–592
- Discordian calendar: 2041
- Ethiopian calendar: 867–868
- Hebrew calendar: 4635–4636
- Hindu calendars
- Vikram Samvat: 931–932
- Shaka Samvat: 796–797
- Kali Yuga: 3975–3976
- Holocene calendar: 10875
- Iranian calendar: 253–254
- Islamic calendar: 261–262
- Japanese calendar: Jōgan 17 (貞観１７年)
- Javanese calendar: 773–774
- Julian calendar: 875; DCCCLXXV
- Korean calendar: 3208
- Minguo calendar: 1037 before ROC 民前1037年
- Nanakshahi calendar: −593
- Seleucid era: 1186/1187 AG
- Thai solar calendar: 1417–1418
- Tibetan calendar: ཤིང་ཕོ་རྟ་ལོ་ (male Wood-Horse); 1001 or 620 or −152 — to — ཤིང་མོ་ལུག་ལོ་ (female Wood-Sheep); 1002 or 621 or −151

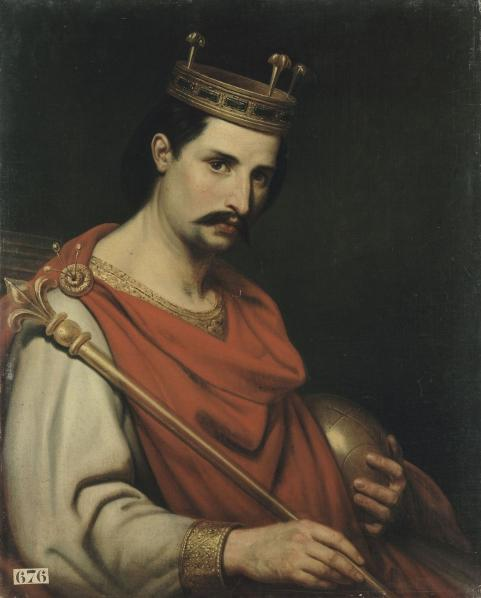
Charles the Bald as Holy Roman Emperor

Year 875 (DCCCLXXV) was a common year starting on Saturday of the Julian calendar.

== Events ==
=== By place ===
==== Europe ====
- August 12 – Emperor Louis II dies in Brescia, after having named his cousin Carloman, son of King Louis the German, as his successor. Louis is buried in the Basilica of Sant'Ambrogio in Milan.
- December 29 – King Charles the Bald, supported by Pope John VIII, travels to Italy. He receives the Imperial Regalia at Pavia, and is crowned Holy Roman Emperor as Charles II at Rome.
- Louis the Stammerer, son of Charles the Bald, marries for the second time Adelaide of Paris, after divorcing Ansgarde of Burgundy, with whom he is secretly married.
- King Harald Fairhair of Norway subdues the rovers on the Orkney Islands and Shetland Islands, and adds them to his kingdom (approximate date).

==== Britain ====
- June – The Great Heathen Army, led by Guthrum, moves on Cambridge. He later returns to Wessex, to establish a winter quarter. King Alfred the Great fights the Danes in a naval engagement.
- Battle of Dollar: Invading Danish Vikings defeat the Scots and the Picts, under King Constantine I, at Dollar. They occupy Caithness, Sutherland, Ross and Moray, far to the north.
- Danish Vikings, probably led by Halfdan Ragnarsson, invade Dublin. During the fighting, Eystein Olafsson, king of Dublin, is killed.
- Donyarth, the last recorded king of Cornwall, drowns in what is thought to be the River Fowey.

==== Arabian Empire ====
- Fall – An Arab fleet from Taranto sails up the Adriatic Sea and sacks Comacchio, putting it to flames. They attack Grado (bishopric of the Venetian Republic), but are repelled by the Venetians.
- Muhammad II, emir of the Aghlabids, dies and is succeeded by his brother Ibrahim II. Towards the end of his reign, a caravan of pilgrims from Mecca introduces the plague in Ifriqiya (Tunisia).
- The Samanid Dynasty establishes a court at Bukhara (modern Uzbekistan), which becomes a rival city to Baghdad on the strategic Silk Road.

==== Asia ====
- King Jayavarman III founds a new dynasty at Indrapura (Quảng Nam) in Champa, in the central region of modern-day Vietnam. He initiates a building program in the Dong Duong Style.

=== By topic ===
==== Religion ====
- The construction of the Great Mosque of Kairouan is completed by Ibrahim II. He builds another three bays, reducing the size of the courtyard.
- Bretons begin to flee the land, seeking the relative security of Britain. Vikings loot the Abbey of Saint-Melaine at Rennes (approximate date).

== Births ==
- March 22 – William I, duke of Aquitaine (d. 918)
- Adalbert II, Frankish margrave (approximate date)
- Ermentrude, Frankish princess, daughter of Louis the Stammerer (or 878)
- Fruela II, king of Asturias and León (approximate date)
- Fujiwara no Nakahira, Japanese statesman (d. 945)
- Gerhard I, Frankish nobleman (approximate date)
- Lady Ise, Japanese poet (approximate date)
- Mary the Younger, Byzantine saint (d. 902)
- Sale Ngahkwe, king of Burma (approximate date)
- Spytihněv I, duke of Bohemia (approximate date)
- Sueiro Belfaguer, Portuguese nobleman (d. 925)

== Deaths ==
- August 12 – Louis II, king of Italy and Holy Roman Emperor (b. 825)
- October 28 – Remigius of Lyon, Frankish archbishop
- November 11 – Teutberga, queen of Lotharingia
- 'Abdallah ibn Muhammad ibn Yazdad al-Marwazi, Persian official
- Amram Gaon, Jewish liturgist (approximate date)
- Donyarth, king of Cornwall (approximate date)
- Gyeongmun, king of Silla (Korea) (b. 841)
- Eystein Olafsson, Norse–Gael king of Dublin
- Martianus Hiberniensis, Irish monk and calligrapher (b. 819)
- Muhammad II, emir of the Aghlabids
- Muslim ibn al-Hajjaj, Persian scholar
- Xiao Fang, chancellor of the Tang Dynasty (b. 796)
