= 878 =

Calendar year

878 in various calendars
- Gregorian calendar: 878; DCCCLXXVIII
- Ab urbe condita: 1631
- Armenian calendar: 327; ԹՎ ՅԻԷ
- Assyrian calendar: 5628
- Balinese saka calendar: 799–800
- Bengali calendar: 284–285
- Berber calendar: 1828
- Buddhist calendar: 1422
- Burmese calendar: 240
- Byzantine calendar: 6386–6387
- Chinese calendar: 丁酉年 (Fire Rooster); 3575 or 3368 — to — 戊戌年 (Earth Dog); 3576 or 3369
- Coptic calendar: 594–595
- Discordian calendar: 2044
- Ethiopian calendar: 870–871
- Hebrew calendar: 4638–4639
- Hindu calendars
- Vikram Samvat: 934–935
- Shaka Samvat: 799–800
- Kali Yuga: 3978–3979
- Holocene calendar: 10878
- Iranian calendar: 256–257
- Islamic calendar: 264–265
- Japanese calendar: Gangyō 2 (元慶２年)
- Javanese calendar: 776–777
- Julian calendar: 878; DCCCLXXVIII
- Korean calendar: 3211
- Minguo calendar: 1034 before ROC 民前1034年
- Nanakshahi calendar: −590
- Seleucid era: 1189/1190 AG
- Thai solar calendar: 1420–1421
- Tibetan calendar: མེ་མོ་བྱ་ལོ་ (female Fire-Bird); 1004 or 623 or −149 — to — ས་ཕོ་ཁྱི་ལོ་ (male Earth-Dog); 1005 or 624 or −148

Map of England (878) showing the extent of the Danelaw (also known as the Danelagh).

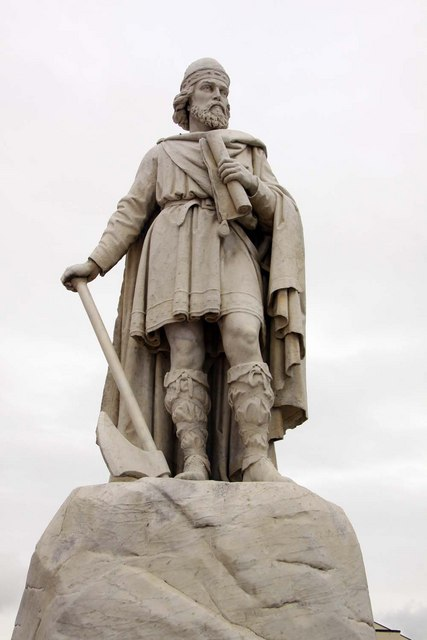
Alfred the Great at Wantage (Oxfordshire)

Year 878 (DCCCLXXVIII) was a common year starting on Wednesday of the Julian calendar.

== Events ==
=== By place ===
==== Europe ====
- March–April – Wilfred the Hairy (ruler of the Catalan counties) with other supporters of Louis the Stammerer (King of West Francia) defeat noble supporters of the rebel Bernard of Gothia.
- September 11 – Bernard of Gothia is dispossessed of his titles by Louis.

==== Britain ====
- January 6 – Battle of Chippenham: King Alfred the Great of Wessex is surprised by a Viking attack at Chippenham in Wiltshire. He is forced to flee, with his retinue, into the Somerset Levels for safety. From his headquarters at Athelney, Alfred wages guerrilla warfare against the Vikings.
- May – Battle of Edington: Supported by all the levies of Somerset, Wiltshire and Hampshire, Alfred the Great decisively defeats the main body of Danish Vikings, led by King Guthrum, at modern-day Edington, Wiltshire (near Bratton Castle).
- Treaty of Wedmore: Guthrum agrees to a peace treaty and is baptised, taking the name of Aethelstan. England is divided between Wessex in the south, and the Vikings in the Danelaw up north. Guthrum returns to East Anglia.
- Battle of Cynwit: Viking raiders, led by Ubba Ragnarsson, land on the coast at Combwich with 23 ships, and besiege a hillfort (called Cynwit) at Cannington, Somerset. Ealdorman Odda launches a surprise attack, and kills Ubba in battle.
- King Rhodri the Great of Gwynedd, Powys and Seisyllwg, returns to his kingdoms, but is killed fighting the Mercians of King Ceolwulf II. His kingdoms are divided amongst his three sons: Anarawd, Merfyn and Cadell.
- King Áed mac Cináeda of Scotland is killed in battle, by his rival Giric mac Dúngal. Giric becomes king of the Picts, and allies himself with Eochaid (grandson of Kenneth I). The two rule all of Alba (Scotland) together as joint-kings.

==== Arabian Empire ====
- May 21 – Siege of Syracuse: The Aghlabids capture the Byzantine fortress city of Syracuse, after a nine-month siege. Most of the population is massacred by the Arabs.
- Zanj Rebellion: The Zanj (black slaves from East Africa) in Mesopotamia seize Wasit (modern Iraq), and establish a presence in the Persian province of Khuzestan.
- Reconquista: King Alfonso III of Asturias conquers the city of Coimbra (modern Portugal), which is under the Umayyad Caliphate.

=== By topic ===
==== Religion ====
- April 16 – The city of Belgrade is first mentioned in a papal letter to Boris I, ruler (khan) of the Bulgarian Empire.
- September 7 – Pope John VIII crowns Louis the Stammerer as king of the West Frankish Kingdom, in the cathedral at Troyes.
- Poorna, the illegitimate grand-daughter of Shankara, unifies all of his teaching in the Upadeśasāhasrī.
- The excommunication of Formosus is lifted, after he has promised never to return to Rome. He will become Pope in 891.

== Births ==
- Bardas Phokas the Elder, Byzantine general (d. 968)
- Ermentrude of France, daughter of Louis the Stammerer (or 875)
- Krishna II, king of Rashtrakuta (India) (d. 914)
- Miró II of Cerdanya, Frankish nobleman (approximate date)
- Odo of Cluny, Frankish abbot (approximate date)

== Deaths ==
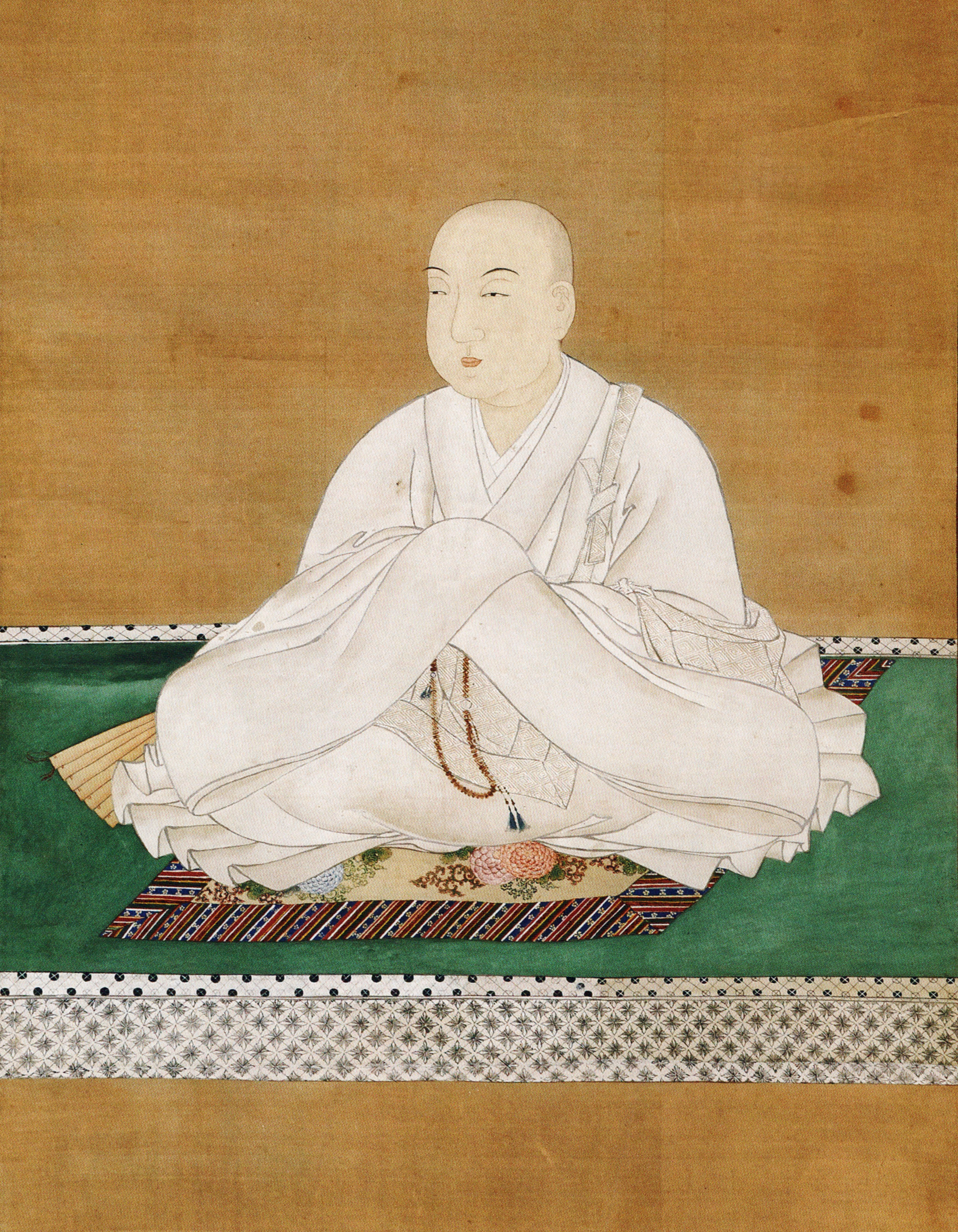
Emperor Seiwa

- Abu Zur'a al-Razi, Muslim scholar
- Áed mac Cináeda, king of Alba (Scotland)
- Adelchis, prince of Benevento
- Amoghavarsha I, king of Rashtrakuta (b. 800)
- Anastasius Bibliothecarius, antipope of Rome (approximate date)
- Gauzfrid, Count of Maine, Frankish nobleman
- Iljko, duke (knyaz) of Croatia
- Rhodri the Great, king of Wales
- Run of Alt Clut, king of Strathclyde (approximate date)
- Ubba Ragnarsson, Viking chieftain
- Wang Xianzhi, Chinese rebel leader
