= History of Jerusalem during the Early Muslim period =

History of Jerusalem from Muslim to Crusader conquest

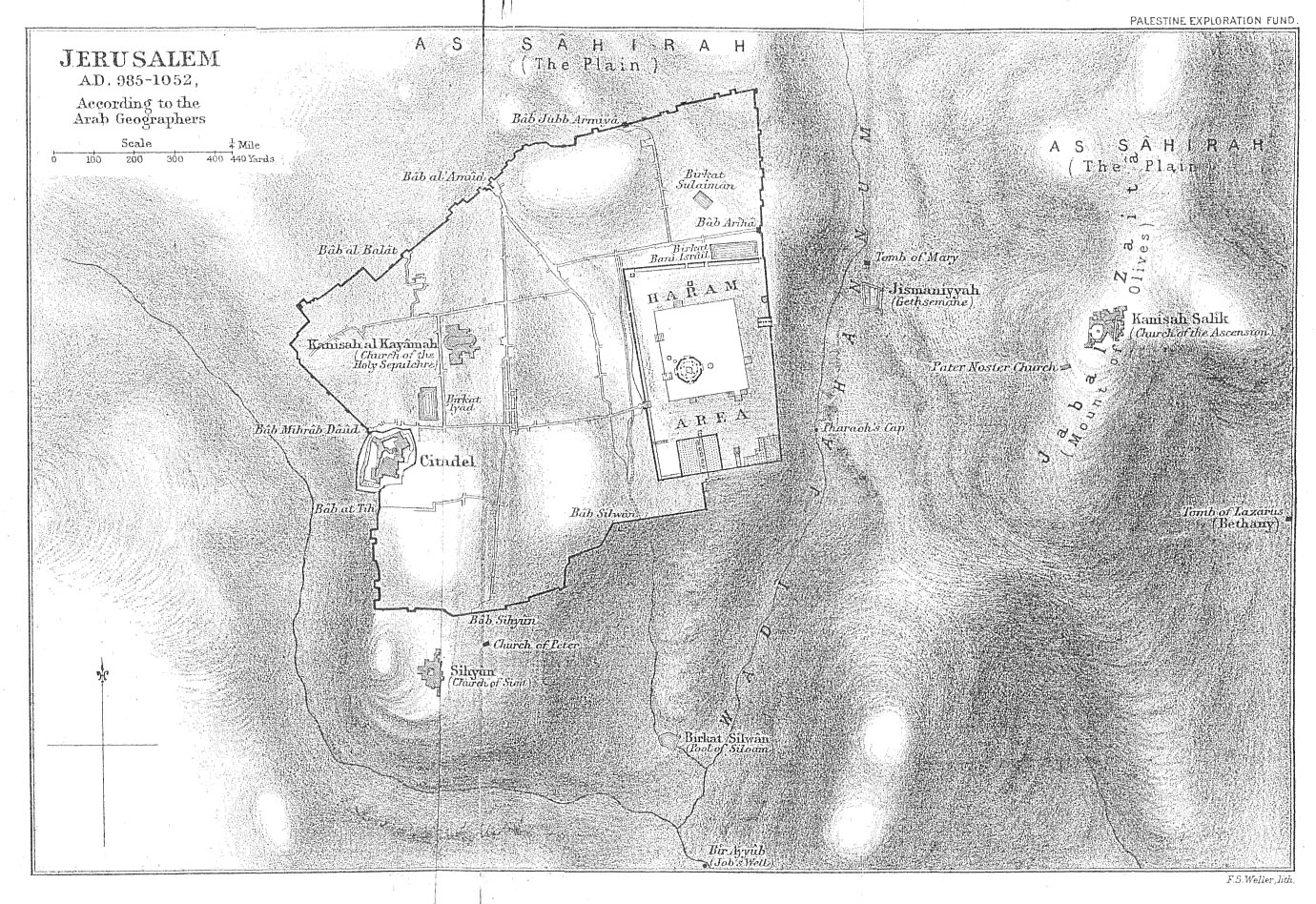
An outdated and very inaccurate 1890 attempt by Le Strange to reconstruct the city plan of Jerusalem of 958–1052, by interpreting the descriptions of Arab geographers such as al-Muqaddasi.

The history of Jerusalem during the Early Muslim period covers the period between the capture of the city from the Byzantines by the Arab Muslim armies of the nascent Caliphate in 637–638 CE, and its conquest by the European Catholic armies of the First Crusade in 1099. Throughout this period, Jerusalem remained a largely Christian city with smaller Muslim and Jewish communities. It was successively part of several Muslim states, beginning with the Rashidun caliphs of Medina, the Umayyads of Syria, the Abbasids of Baghdad and their nominal Turkish vassals in Egypt, and the Fatimid caliphs of Cairo, who struggled over it with the Turkic Seljuks and different other regional powers, only to finally lose it to the Crusaders.

The second caliph, Umar (r. 634–644), secured Muslim control of the city from the Patriarch of Jerusalem. During his rule Muslim prayer was likely established on the Temple Mount and limited numbers of Jews were allowed to reside in the city after a five centuries-long ban by the Romans/Byzantines. Beginning with Caliph Mu'awiya I (r. 661–680), the early Umayyad caliphs devoted special attention to the city as a result of its sanctity and several obtained their oaths of allegiance there. The Umayyads Abd al-Malik (r. 685–705) and al-Walid I (r. 705–715) invested considerably in constructing Muslim edifices on the Temple Mount, namely the Dome of the Rock and the al-Aqsa Mosque, as well other religious and administrative structures, gates, and roadworks. Their successor Sulayman (r. 715–717) likely resided in Jerusalem at the beginning of his reign, but his founding of the nearby city of Ramla came at the political and economic expense of Jerusalem in the long term.

== Overview ==
Throughout the Early Muslim and Crusader periods, up until Saladin's conquest of 1187, Jerusalem retained a sizable Christian majority, which only ceased to exist once Saladin removed the Frankish population in 1187.

During the early centuries of Muslim rule, especially under the Umayyad (661–750) and Abbasid (750–969) dynasties, the city prospered; the 10th-century geographers Ibn Hawqal and al-Istakhri describe it as "the most fertile province of Palestine", while its native son, geographer al-Muqaddasi (born 946) devoted many pages to its praises in his most famous work, The Best Divisions in the Knowledge of the Climes. Jerusalem under Muslim rule, however, did not achieve the political or cultural status enjoyed by the capitals Damascus, Baghdad, Cairo etc.

With the decline of the Carolingian Empire, which split up in 888, a period of anti-Christian persecution by the Muslims began. However, the recovered Byzantines filled this void and as the Empire expanded under the Byzantine Crusades, Christians were again allowed to make pilgrimages to Jerusalem.

== Rashidun period (630s–661) ==
=== Domination of the countryside ===
Southern Palestine was conquered by the Muslims under the commander Amr ibn al-As following their decisive victory over the Byzantines at the Battle of Ajnadayn, likely fought at a site about 25 kilometers (16 mi) south-southwest of Jerusalem, in 634. Although Jerusalem remained unoccupied, the 634 Christmas sermon of Patriarch Sophronius of Jerusalem indicated that the Muslim Arabs were in control of the city's environs by then, as the Patriarch was unable to travel to nearby Bethlehem for the ritual Feast of the Nativity due to the presence of Arab raiders. According to one reconstruction of the Islamic tradition, a Muslim advance force was sent against Jerusalem by Amr ibn al-As on his way to Ajnadayn. By 635 southern Syria was in Muslim hands, except for Jerusalem and the Byzantines' capital of Palestine, Caesarea. In his homily of the Theophany (Orthodox Epiphany), c. 636–637, Sophronius lamented the killings, raids, and destruction of churches by the Arabs.

=== Siege and capitulation ===
It is unclear when Jerusalem was precisely captured, but most modern sources place it in the spring of 637. In that year the troops of Abu Ubayda ibn al-Jarrah, head commander of the Muslim forces in Syria, besieged the city. History records Caliph Umar (r. 634–644), who was headquartered in Medina, made one or several visits to Jabiya, the Muslims' principal camp in Syria, in 637–638. The modern historians Fred Donner and Hugh N. Kennedy assess that he came to address multiple administrative matters in the newly conquered province. While in Jabiya, Umar negotiated Jerusalem's surrender with a delegation from the city, as the Patriarch insisted on surrendering to the Caliph directly rather than his commanders.

The earliest known Muslim tradition of Jerusalem's capture was cited in the history of al-Baladhuri (d. 892) and credits the Arab commander Khalid ibn Thabit al-Fahmi for arranging the city's capitulation with terms guaranteeing Muslim domination of the countryside and safeguarding the city's inhabitants in return for tributary payment. Khalid ibn Thabit had been dispatched by Umar from Jabiya. The historian Shelomo Dov Goitein considered this tradition to be the most reliable narrative of Jerusalem's capture. Another account, that contained in the histories of al-Ya'qubi (d. 898) and Eutychius of Alexandria (d. 940), holds that a treaty was agreed between the Muslims and Jerusalem's inhabitants, though the terms were largely the same as those cited by al-Baladhuri. The 10th-century history of al-Tabari, citing the 8th-century historian Sayf ibn Umar, reproduces the capitulation agreement in detail, though parts of it may have been altered from the time it was made. Although Goitein considered Sayf's account "worthless" on account of Sayf's general unreliability, the historians Moshe Gil and Milka Levy-Rubin have argued that the tradition was largely authentic. The agreement for Jerusalem was generally favorable for the city's Christian inhabitants, guaranteeing the safety of their persons, their property, and churches, and allowing them the freedom of worship in return for payment of the jizya (poll tax). Byzantine troops and other residents seeking to evacuate the city were given security assurances from the time they left Jerusalem until they reached their point of departure from Palestine. Gil assessed that Umar adopted a lenient approach so that the inhabitants could continue their way of life and work and thus be able to subsidize the Arab tribesmen garrisoned in Palestine.

The treaty cited in al-Tabari, and later Christian sources, contained a stipulation barring Jewish residency alongside the city's Christians, a continuation of a ban started in the days of Emperor Hadrian (r. 117–138) and renewed in the days of Emperor Constantine (r. 306–337). Among them was the history of Michael the Syrian (d. 1199), who wrote that Sophronius negotiated the ban on Jews residing in Jerusalem. (see below).

Several later Muslim and Christians accounts, as well as an 11th-century Jewish chronicle, mention a visit to Jerusalem by Umar. One set of accounts held that Umar was guided by Jews who showed him the Temple Mount. In the Muslim and Jewish accounts, a prominent Jewish convert to Islam, Ka'b al-Ahbar, recommended that Umar pray behind the Holy Rock so that both qiblas (direction point of Islamic prayer) lay behind him. Umar rejected the suggestion, insisting that the Ka'aba in Mecca was the sole qibla; Jerusalem had been the original qibla of the early Muslims until Muhammad changed it to the Ka'aba. The Muslim and Jewish sources reported that the Temple Mount was cleaned by the Muslims of the city and its district and a group of Jews. The Jewish account further noted that Umar oversaw the process and consulted with Jewish elders; Gil suggests the Jewish elders may be a reference to Ka'b al-Ahbar. The Christian accounts mentioned that Umar visited Jerusalem's churches, but refused to pray in them to avoid setting a precedent for future Muslims. This tradition may have been originated by later Christian writers to promote efforts against Muslim encroachments on their holy places.

=== Post-conquest administration and settlement ===
Jerusalem is presumed by Goitein and the historian Amikam Elad to have been the Muslims' main political and religious center in Jund Filastin (district of Palestine) from the conquest until the foundation of Ramla at the beginning of the 8th century. It may have been preceded by the Muslims' principal military camp at Emmaus Nicopolis before this was abandoned due to the Plague of Amwas in 639. The historian Nimrod Luz, on the other hand, holds that the early Muslim tradition indicates Palestine from the time of Umar had dual capitals at Jerusalem and Lydda, each city having its own governor and garrison. An auxiliary force of tribesmen from Yemen was posted in the city during this period. Amr ibn al-As launched the conquest of Egypt from Jerusalem in c. 640, and his son Abd Allah transmitted hadiths about the city.

Christian leadership in Jerusalem entered a state of disorganization following the death of Sophronius c. 638, with no new patriarch appointed until 702. Nonetheless, Jerusalem remained largely Christian in character throughout the early Islamic period. Not long after the conquest, possibly in 641, Umar allowed a limited number of Jews to reside in Jerusalem after negotiations with the Christian leadership of the city. An 11th-century Jewish chronicle fragment from the Cairo Geniza indicated that the Jews requested the settlement of two hundred families, the Christians would only accept fifty, and that Umar ultimately decided on the settlement of seventy families from Tiberias. Gil attributed the Caliph's move to his recognition of the Jews' local importance, by dint of their considerable presence and economic strength in Palestine, as well as a desire to weaken Christian dominance of Jerusalem.

At the time of the conquest, the Temple Mount had been in a state of ruin, the Byzantine Christians having left it largely unused for scriptural reasons. The Muslims appropriated the site for administrative and religious purposes. This was likely due to a range of factors. Among them was that the Temple Mount was a large, unoccupied space in Jerusalem, where the Muslims were restricted by the capitulation terms from confiscating Christian-owned property in the city. Jewish converts to Islam may have also influenced the early Muslims regarding the site's holiness, and the early Muslims may have wanted to demonstrate their opposition to the Christian belief that the Temple Mount should remain empty. Moreover, the early Muslims may have had a spiritual attachment to the site before the conquest. Their utilization of the Temple Mount provided a vast space for the Muslims overlooking the whole city. The Temple Mount was likely used for Muslim prayer from the beginning of Muslim rule, due to the capitulation agreement's prohibitions on Muslims using Christian edifices. Such usage of the Temple Mount may have been authorized by Umar. The traditions cited by the 11th-century Jerusalemites al-Wasiti and Ibn al-Murajja note that Jews were employed as caretakers and cleaners of the Temple Mount and the ones employed were exempt from the jizya.

The earliest Muslim settlement activity took place south and southwest of the site, in thinly populated areas; much of the Christian settlement was concentrated in western Jerusalem around Golgotha and Mount Zion. The first Muslim settlers in Jerusalem hailed mainly from the Ansar, i.e. the people of Medina. They included Shaddad ibn Aws, nephew of the prominent companion of Muhammad and poet Hassan ibn Thabit. Shaddad died and was buried in Jerusalem between 662 and 679. His family remained prominent there, and his tomb later became a place of veneration. Another prominent companion, the Ansarite commander Ubada ibn al-Samit, also settled in Jerusalem where he became the city's first qadi (Islamic judge). The father of Muhammad's Jewish concubine Rayhana and a Jewish convert from Medina, Sham'un (Simon), settled in Jerusalem and, according to Mujir al-Din, delivered Muslim sermons on the Temple Mount. Umm al-Darda, an Ansarite and the wife of the first qadi of Damascus, resided in Jerusalem for half of the year. Umar's successor Caliph Uthman (r. 644–656) was said by the 10th-century Jerusalemite geographer al-Muqaddasi to have earmarked the revenues of Silwan's bountiful vegetable gardens on the city's outskirts, which would have been Muslim property per the capitulation terms, to the city's poor.

== Umayyad period (661–750) ==
=== Sufyanid period (661–684) ===
Caliph Mu'awiya ibn Abi Sufyan (r. 661–680), the founder of the Umayyad Caliphate, originally served as the governor of Syria under Umar and Uthman. He opposed Uthman's successor Ali during the First Muslim Civi War and forged a pact against him with the former governor of Egypt and conqueror of Palestine, Amr ibn al-As, in Jerusalem in 658.

According to the near-contemporary Maronite Chronicle and Islamic traditional accounts, Mu'awiya obtained oaths of allegiance as caliph in Jerusalem on at least two different occasions between 660 and July 661. Although the precise dating is inconsistent, the Muslim and non-Muslim accounts generally agree that the oaths to Mu'awiya took place at a mosque on the Temple Mount. The mosque may have been erected by Umar and expanded by Mu'awiya, though there are no apparent traces of the structure today. The Maronite Chronicle notes that "many emirs and Tayyaye [Arab nomads] gathered [at Jerusalem] and proffered their right hand[s] to Mu'awiya". Afterward, he sat and prayed at Golgotha and then prayed at Mary's Tomb in Gethsemane. The "Arab nomads" were likely the indigenous Arab tribesmen of Syria, most of whom had converted to Christianity under the Byzantines and many of whom had retained their Christian faith during the early decades of Islamic rule. Mu'awiya's prayer at Christian sites was out of respect for the Syrian Arabs, who were the foundation of his power. His advisers Sarjun ibn Mansur and Ubayd Allah ibn Aws the Ghassanid may have helped organize the Jerusalem ceremonies.

Mu'awiya's son and successor to the caliphate, Yazid I (r. 680–683), may have visited Jerusalem on several occasions during his lifetime. The historian Irfan Shahid theorizes that the visits, in the company of the prominent Arab Christian poet al-Akhtal, were attempts to promote his own legitimacy as caliph among the Muslims.

=== Marwanid period (684–750) ===
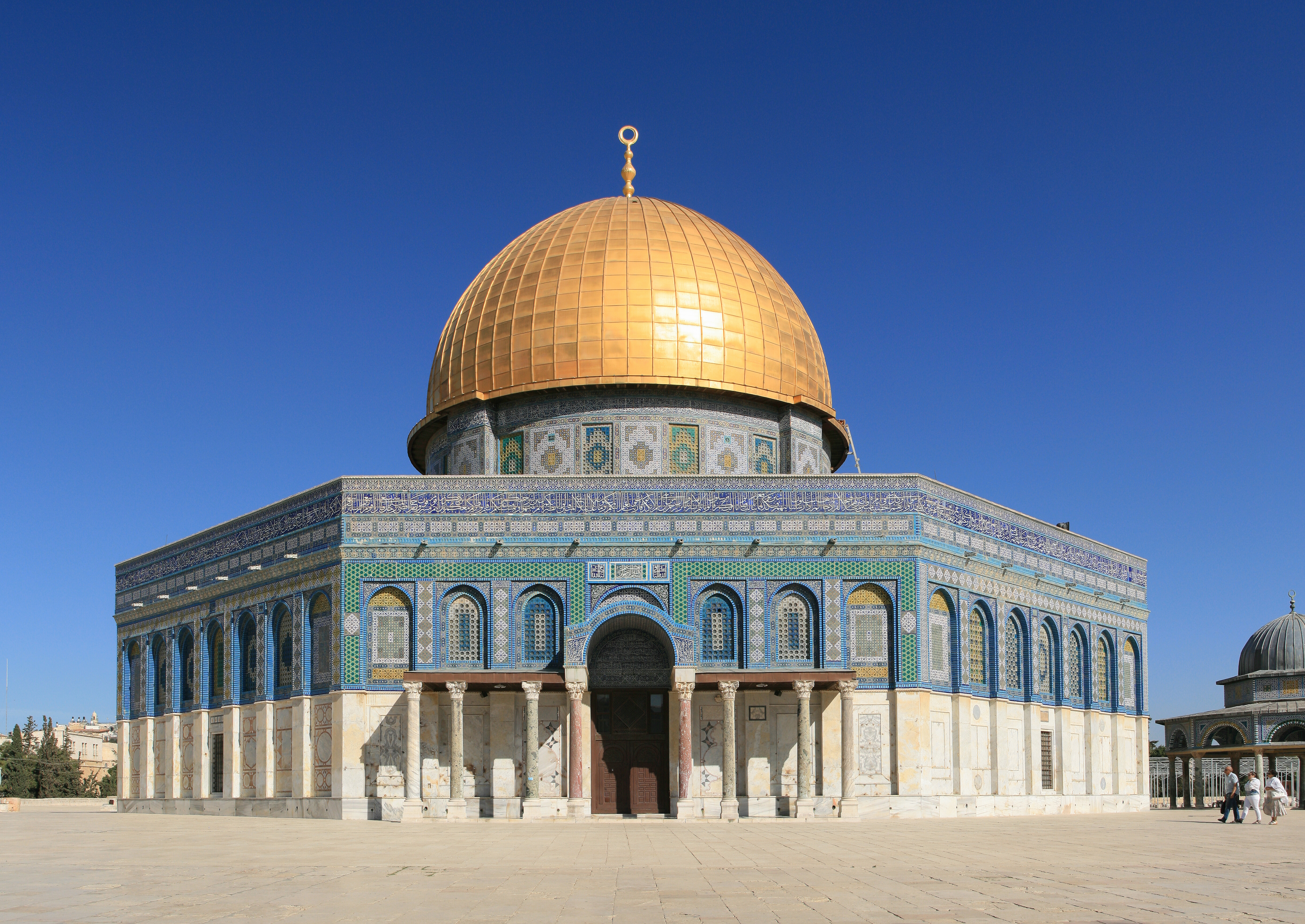
The Dome of the Rock (pictured in 2015) on the Temple Mount in Jerusalem was founded by the Umayyad caliph Abd al-Malik in 691/92

The Umayyad caliph Abd al-Malik (r. 685–705), who had served as the governor of Jund Filastin under his father Caliph Marwan I (r. 684–685), received his oaths of allegiance in Jerusalem. From the beginning of his caliphate, Abd al-Malik began plans for the construction of the Dome of the Rock and the al-Aqsa Mosque, both located on the Temple Mount. The Dome of the Rock was completed in 691–692, constituting the first great work of Islamic architecture. The Dome of the Rock's construction was supervised by the Caliph's theological adviser Raja ibn Haywa of Beisan and his Jerusalemite mawla (non-Arab convert to Islam) Yazid ibn Salam. The construction of the Dome of the Chain on the Temple Mount is generally credited to Abd al-Malik.

Abd al-Malik and his practical viceroy over Iraq, al-Hajjaj ibn Yusuf, are credited by the Islamic tradition for constructing two gates of the Temple Mount, which Elad proposes are the Prophet's Gate and the Mercy Gate; both are attributed to the Umayyads by modern scholars. The Caliph repaired the roads connecting his capital Damascus with Palestine and linking Jerusalem to its eastern and western hinterlands. The roadworks are evidenced by seven milestones found throughout the region, the oldest of which dates to May 692 and the latest to September 704. The milestones, all containing inscriptions crediting Abd al-Malik, were found, from north to south, in or near Fiq, Samakh, St. George's Monastery of Wadi Qelt, Khan al-Hathrura, Bab al-Wad and Abu Ghosh. The fragment of an eighth milestone, likely produced soon after Abd al-Malik's death, was found at Ein Hemed, immediately west of Abu Ghosh. The road project formed part of the Caliph's centralization drive, special attention being paid to Palestine due to its critical position as a transit zone between Syria and Egypt and Jerusalem's religious centrality to the Caliph.

Extensive building works took place on the Temple Mount and outside of its walls under Abd al-Malik's son and successor al-Walid I (r. 705–715). Modern historians generally credit al-Walid with the construction of the al-Aqsa Mosque on the Temple Mount, though the mosque may have been originally built by his Umayyad predecessors; according to the latter view, al-Walid was nonetheless responsible for part of the mosque's construction. The Aphrodito Papyri indicate that laborers from Egypt were sent to Jerusalem for terms ranging between six months and one year to work on the al-Aqsa Mosque, al-Walid's caliphal palace, and a third, undefined building for the Caliph. Elad holds that the six Umayyad buildings excavated south and west of the Temple Mount may include the palace and undefined building mentioned in the papyri.

Al-Walid's brother and successor Sulayman (r. 715–717), who had served as the governor of Jund Filastin under al-Walid and Abd al-Malik, was initially recognized as caliph in Jerusalem by the Arab tribes and dignitaries. He resided in Jerusalem for an unspecified period during his caliphate, and his contemporary, the poet al-Farazdaq, may have alluded to this in the verse "In the Mosque al-Aqsa resides the Imam [Sulayman]". He constructed a bathhouse there, but may not have shared the same adoration for Jerusalem as his predecessors. Sulayman's construction of a new city, Ramla, located about 40 kilometres (25 mi) northwest of Jerusalem, came at Jerusalem's expense in the long-term, as Ramla developed into Jund Filastin's administrative and economic capital.

According to the Byzantine historian Theophanes the Confessor (d. 818), Jerusalem's walls were destroyed by the last Umayyad caliph, Marwan II, in 745. At that time, the Caliph had suppressed the Arab tribes in Palestine opposed to him for joining the revolt of the Umayyad prince Sulayman ibn Hisham in northern Syria.

=== Muslim pilgrimage and rituals in the Umayyad period ===
Under the Umayyads the focus of Muslim ritual ceremonies and pilgrimage in Jerusalem was the Temple Mount and to a lesser extent the Prayer Niche of David (possibly the Tower of David), the Spring of Silwan, the Garden of Gethsemane and Mary's Tomb, and the Mount of Olives. The Umayyads encouraged Muslim pilgrimage and prayer in Jerusalem and traditions originated during the Umayyad period celebrated the city. During this period, Muslim pilgrims came to Jerusalem to sanctify themselves before making the Umra or Hajj pilgrimages to Mecca. Muslims who could not make the pilgrimage, and possibly Christians and Jews, donated olive oil for the illumination of the al-Aqsa Mosque. The bulk of the Muslim pilgrims to Jerusalem were presumably from Palestine and Syria in general, though several came from distant parts of the Caliphate.

== Abbasids, Tulunids and Ikhshidids (750–969) ==
The Umayyads were toppled in 750 by the Abbasid dynasty, which afterward ruled the Caliphate including Jerusalem, with interruptions, for the next two centuries. This period is the least documented of the early Muslim period in general. Known building activity was concentrated in the Temple Mount area and was characterized by repairs of structures damaged in earthqauakes. The caliphs al-Mansur (r. 754–775) and al-Mahdi (r. 775–785) ordered major reconstruction of the al-Aqsa Mosque after earthquake damage.

After the first Abbasid period (750–878), the Tulunids, a mamluk dynasty of Turkic origin, managed to independently rule over Egypt and much of Greater Syria, including Palestine, for almost three decades (878–905). Ahmad ibn Tulun, the founder of the Egypt-based dynasty, consolidated his rule over Palestine between 878 and 880 and passed it on to his son at his death in 884. According to Patriarch Elias III of Jerusalem, Ibn Tulun finished a period of persecution against Christians by naming a Christian governor in Ramla (or perhaps Jerusalem), the governor initiating the renovation of churches in the city. Ibn Tulun had a Jewish physician and generally showed a very relaxed attitude towards dhimmis, and when he lay on his deathbed, both Jews and Christians prayed for him. Ibn Tulun was the first in a line of Egypt-based rulers of Palestine, which ended with the Ikhshidids. While the Tulunids managed to preserve a high degree of autonomy, the Abbasids retook control over Jerusalem in 905, and between 935 and 969 it was administered by their Egyptian governors, the Ikhshidids. During this entire period, Jerusalem's religious importance grew, several of the Egyptian rulers choosing to be buried there.

Abbasid rule returned between 905 and 969, the first 30 years of which was direct rule from Baghdad (905–935), and the rest was through the Ikhshidid governors of Egypt (935–969). The mother of Caliph al-Muqtadir (r. 908–932) had wooden porches built under all the city gates and repaired the Dome of the Rock.

The Ikhshidid period was characterised by acts of persecution against the Christians, including an attack by the Muslims on the Church of the Holy Sepulchre in 937, with the church set on fire and its treasure robbed. The tensions were connected with the renewed threat posed by the encroaching Byzantines, and on this background the Jews joined forces with the Muslims. In 966 the Muslim and Jewish mob, instigated by the Ikhshidid governor, attacked again the Church of the Holy Sepulchre, the resulting fire causing the collapse of the dome standing over the Tomb of Jesus and causing the death of Patriarch John VII.

== Fatimids and Seljuks (970–1099) ==
The start of the first Fatimid period (970–1071) saw a predominantly Berber army conquer the region. After six decades of war and another four of relative stability, Turkish tribes invade the region, starting off a period of permanent upheaval, fighting against each other and the Fatimids and, in less than thirty years of warfare and vandalism, destroyed much of Palestine, bringing terrible hardships, particularly on the Jewish population. However, the Jewish communities stayed in their places, only to be uprooted after 1099 by the Crusaders. Turkish rule totalled more than a quarter of a century of constant warfare, negatively affecting the local Christian communities, as well as eventually blocking the access of pilgrims from Europe, which is seen as a factor in initiating the Crusades. We know however also about a visitor from Muslim Spain, who left us a report about the intense activity in Jerusalem's Sunni madrasas and his interaction with Jews and Christians in the years 1093–95.

Between 1071 and 1076, Palestine was captured by Turkman or Turcoman tribes, with Jerusalem falling in 1073. The Turcomans acted in the region as free agents, but became known as Seljuqs, after the primary rulers among the Turkish invaders of the Arab Muslim realm, the Seljuk dynasty, whom they were associated with. Seljuk emir Atsiz ibn Uvaq al-Khwarizmi, leader of the Turkic tribe of the Nawaki, besieged and captured Jerusalem in 1073 and held it for four years. Atsiz placed the territory he captured under the nominal control of the 'Abbasid caliphate. In 1077, on his return from a disastrous attempt to capture Cairo, the capital of the Fatimid caliphate, he found that in his absence the inhabitants of Jerusalem had rebelled and forced his garrison to shelter in the citadel, capturing the families and property of the Turcomans. Atsiz besieged Jerusalem and promised the defenders the aman, pardon and safety, at which they surrendered. Atsiz broke his promise and slaughtered 3000 inhabitants, including those who had taken shelter in the Al-Aqsa Mosque and only sparing those inside the Dome of the Rock. In 1079, Atsiz was murdered by his nominal ally Tutush, who subsequently established firmer 'Abbasid authority in the area. After Atsiz other Seljuk commanders ruled over Jerusalem and used it as a power base in their unceasing wars. A new period of turbulence began in 1091 with the death of Tutush's governor in Jerusalem, Artuq and the succession of his two sons, who were bitter rivals. The city changed hands between them several times, until August 1098, when the Fatimids, seizing the opportunity presented by the approach of the First Crusade, regained control of the city and ruled it for a less than a year.

=== Jewish community in the 11th century ===
The Jewish population suffered great hardship during the tumultuous years of Turkish rule, even the Jerusalem yeshiva, the central institution of Jewish law in Palestine, being forced to move to Tyre sometime after 1078, in the wake of the rebellion against Atsiz, although there is no information on whether the Jews did take part in it along with the Muslim citizens.

According to Rabbi Elijah of Chelm, German Jews lived in Jerusalem during the 11th century. The story is told that a German-speaking Palestinian Jew saved the life of a young German man surnamed Dolberger. So when the knights of the First Crusade came to besiege Jerusalem, one of Dolberger's family members who was among them rescued Jews in Palestine and carried them back to Worms to repay the favor. Further evidence of German Jewish communities in the holy city comes in the form of halakic questions sent from Germany to Jerusalem during the second half of the 11th century.

=== Christian community in the 11th century ===
As the Byzantine borders expanded into the Levant in the early 11th century, the limited tolerance of the Muslim rulers toward Christians in the Middle East, began to wane. The Egyptian Fatimid Caliph Al-Hakim bi-Amr Allah ordered the destruction of all churches throughout the Muslim world starting with those in Jerusalem. The Church of the Holy Resurrection, revered by all Christians of the time as the site of Christ's crucifixion and burial, was among the places of worship destroyed, but permission was later given for its rebuilding.

The suffering and privation caused by the decades of bellicose Turkish rule lead some local Christians to expect the imminent coming of the End of Days, and as a consequence of the permanent war footing, the mainly Fatimid-held ports of Palestine turned away the pilgrims' ships arriving from Europe in 1093, a situation which contributed to the start of the First Crusade. Altogether, although information is very scarce, it seems that the Turcomans favoured the Jacobites and Latins over the Greek Orthodox, who were seen as close to the Byzantine Empire, a constant enemy.

== See also ==
- Islamization of Jerusalem

== Bibliography ==
- Avni, Gideon (2014). The Byzantine-Islamic Transition in Palestine: An Archaeological Approach. Oxford University Press. ISBN 9780199684335.
- Bacharach, Jere L. (2010). "Signs of Sovereignty: The "Shahāda", the Qurʾanic Verses, and the Coinage of ʿAbd al-Malik". Muqarnas Online. 27. Brill: 1–30. doi:10.1163/22118993_02701002. ISSN 2211-8993. JSTOR 25769690.
- Blankinship, Khalid Yahya, ed. (1993). The History of al-Ṭabarī, Volume XI: The Challenge to the Empires. SUNY Series in Near Eastern Studies. Albany, New York: State University of New York Press. ISBN 978-0-7914-0851-3.
- Cytryn-Silverman, Katia (2007). "The Fifth Mīl from Jerusalem: Another Umayyad Milestone from Southern Bilād al-Shām". Bulletin of the School of Oriental and African Studies. 70 (3). Cambridge University Press: 603–610. doi:10.1017/S0041977X07000857. JSTOR 40378940. S2CID 162314029.
- Donner, Fred M. (1981). The Early Islamic Conquests. Princeton: Princeton University Press. ISBN 0-691-05327-8.
- Elad, Amikam (1999). Medieval Jerusalem and Islamic Worship: Holy Places, Ceremonies, Pilgrimage (2nd ed.). Leiden: Brill. ISBN 90-04-10010-5.
- Flusin, Bernard (2011). "Palestinian Hagiography (Fourth-Eighth Centuries)". In Stephanos Efthymiadis (ed.). The Ashgate Research Companion to Byzantine Hagiography. Vol. 1. Ashgate Publishing. ISBN 9780754650331.
- Gil, Moshe (1997) [1983]. A History of Palestine, 634–1099. Translated by Ethel Broido. Cambridge: Cambridge University Press. ISBN 0-521-59984-9.
- Goitein, S. D. (1986). "Al-Kuds: A. History". In Bosworth, C. E.; van Donzel, E.; Lewis, B. & Pellat, Ch. (eds.). The Encyclopaedia of Islam, Second Edition. Volume V: Khe–Mahi. Leiden: E. J. Brill. pp. 322–339. ISBN 978-90-04-07819-2.
- Grabar, O. (1986). "Al-Kuds, B. Monuments". In Bosworth, C. E.; van Donzel, E.; Lewis, B. & Pellat, Ch. (eds.). The Encyclopaedia of Islam, Second Edition. Volume V: Khe–Mahi. Leiden: E. J. Brill. pp. 340–. ISBN 978-90-04-07819-2.
- Kennedy, Hugh (2007). The Great Arab Conquests: How the Spread of Islam Changed the World We Live In. Philadelphia, Pennsylvania: Da Capo Press. ISBN 978-0-306-81740-3.
- Lecker, Michael (1989). "The Estates of 'Amr b. al-'Āṣ in Palestine: Notes on a New Negev Arabic Inscription". Bulletin of the School of Oriental and African Studies, University of London. 52 (1): 24–37. doi:10.1017/S0041977X00023041. JSTOR 617911. S2CID 163092638.
- Levy-Rubin, Milka (2009). "Were the Jews Prohibited from Settling in Jerusalem? On the Authenticity of al-Ṭabarī's Jerusalem Surrender Agreement". Jerusalem Studies in Arabic and Islam. 36: 63–81.
- Luz, Nimrod (April 1997). "The Construction of an Islamic City in Palestine. The Case of Umayyad al-Ramla". Journal of the Royal Asiatic Society. 7 (1): 27–54. doi:10.1017/S1356186300008300. JSTOR 25183294. S2CID 163178178.
- Marsham, Andrew (2013). "The Architecture of Allegiance in Early Islamic Late Antiquity: The Accession of Mu'awiya in Jerusalem, ca. 661 CE". In Beihammer, Alexander; Constantinou, Stavroula; Parani, Maria (eds.). Court Ceremonies and Rituals of Power in Byzantium and the Medieval Mediterranean. Leiden and Boston: Brill. pp. 87–114. ISBN 978-90-04-25686-6.
- Rabbat, Nasser (1993). "The Dome of the Rock Revisited: Some Remarks on al-Wasiti's Accounts". Muqarnas. 10: 66–75. doi:10.2307/1523173. JSTOR 1523173.
- Shahid, Irfan (2009). Byzantium and the Arabs in the Sixth Century, Volume 2, Part 2. Washington, D. C.: Dumbarton Oaks Research Library and Collection. ISBN 978-0-88402-347-0.
- Sharon, Moshe (June 1966). "An Arabic Inscription from the Time of the Caliph 'Abd al-Malik". Bulletin of the School of Oriental and African Studies. 29 (2): 367–372. doi:10.1017/S0041977X00058900. S2CID 162899475.
- Sharon, Moshe (2004). Corpus Inscriptionum Arabicarum Palaestinae (CIAP): D-F. Volume Three. Leiden and Boston: Brill. ISBN 90-04-13197-3.
- Shoemaker, Stephen J. (2021). A Prophet Has Appeared: The Rise of Islam Through Christian and Jewish Eyes, a Sourcebook. Oakland: University of California Press. ISBN 9780520299603.
