= Xiao Hua =

Xiao Hua may refer to:

- Xiao Hua (Tang dynasty) (8th century), Tang dynasty chancellor
- Xiao Hua (general) (1916–1985), PLA general
