= Ansegisus (disambiguation) =

Ansegisus (Latin form of the Germanic name Ansegis, French form Anségise) may refer to:

- Saint Ansegisus, abbot of Luxeuil Abbey and Fontenelle Abbey
- Ansegisel, Frankish duke and mayor of the palace
- Ansegisus of Sens, Archbishop of Sens
