= Ponthion =

Commune in Grand Est, France

- Commune
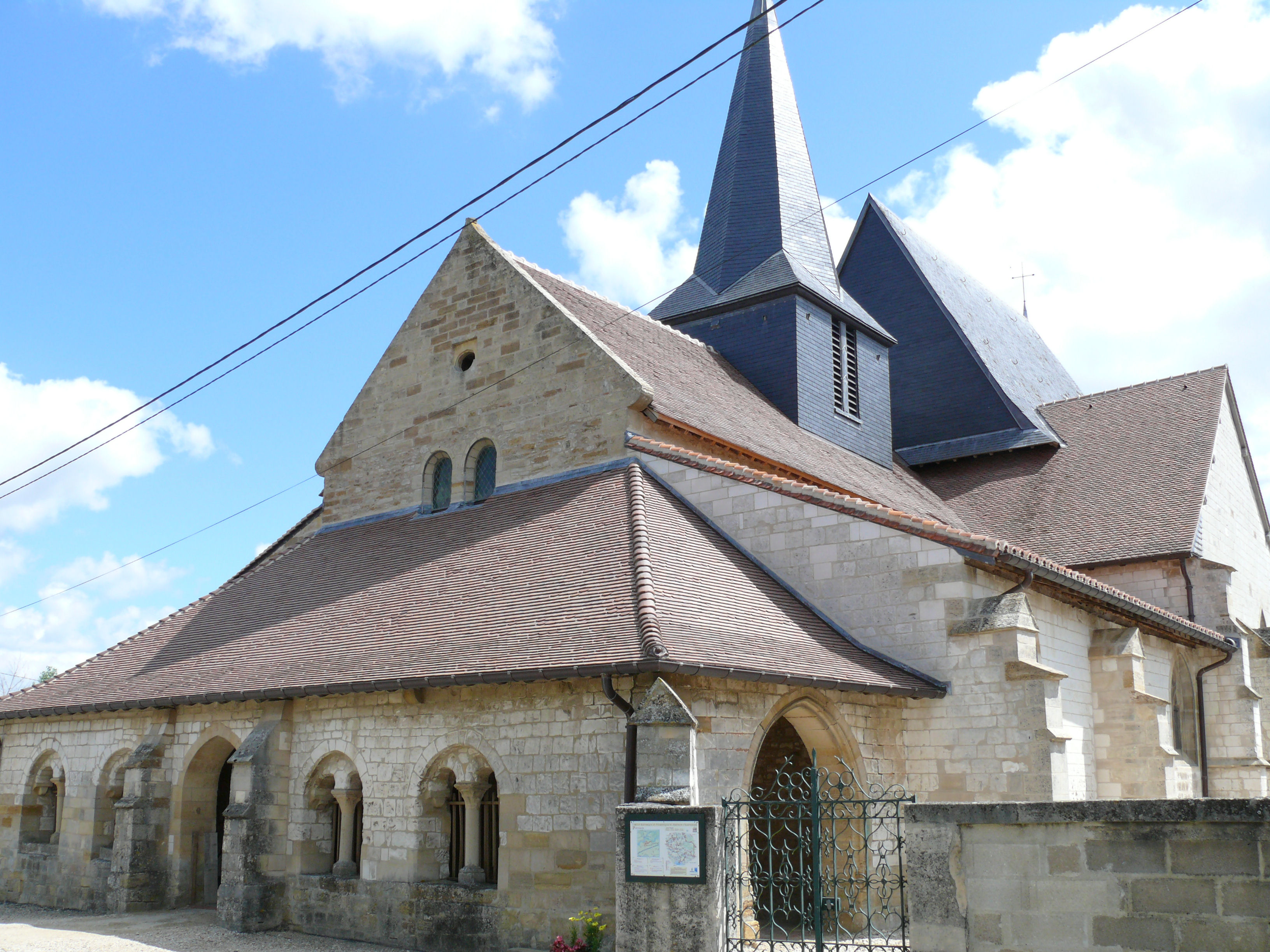
- The church in Ponthion
- Location of Ponthion
- Location within France Location within Grand Est
- Coordinates: 48°45′33″N 4°42′44″E
- Country: France
- Region: Grand Est
- Department: Marne
- Arrondissement: Vitry-le-François
- Canton: Sermaize-les-Bains
- Intercommunality: Côtes de Champagne et Val de Saulx
- Area^{1}: 7.26 km^{2} (2.80 sq mi)
- Elevation: 108 m (354 ft)
- Population (2023): 103
  - Density: 14.2/km^{2} (36.7/sq mi)
- Time zone: UTC+01:00 (CET)
  - Summer (DST): UTC+02:00 (CEST)
- INSEE/Postal code: 51441 /51300
- ^{1} French Land Register data, which excludes lakes, ponds, glaciers > 1 km^{2} (0.386 sq mi or 247 acres) and river estuaries.

Ponthion (French pronunciation: [pɔ̃tjɔ̃]) is a commune in the Marne department in north-eastern France.

It is located southeast of Châlons-en-Champagne.

== History ==
Ponthion was a royal pfalz (crown estate) under both the Merovingian (mainly Neustrian branch) and the Carolingian dynasties. It appears repeatedly in the Frankish royal and ecclesiastical history.

=== Pepin ===
Aistulf, King of the Lombards, was expanding his control of the Italian peninsula and threatening the Duchy of Rome. Having appealed to no avail to the Emperor in Byzantium, Pope Stephen II secretly sent a message by way of a pilgrim to Pepin the Short, King of the Franks. Pepin responded by sending Droctegang, abbot of Jumieges, to confer with the pope. Not long after the abbot left, an envoy arrived from the Emperor directing Stephen to negotiate with Aistulf. Shortly before his departure for Pavia, Duke Autchar and Chrodegang, Bishop of Metz, arrived with an invitation for Stephen to visit Francia.

Pope Stephen II left Rome in mid- October 753 accompanied by some clerics, nobles, the Emperor's envoy, and the Frankish delegation. Aistulf, when the Pope met him at Pavia, refused to enter into negotiations or to hear of a restoration of his conquests. Only with difficulty did Stephen finally prevail upon the Lombard king not to hinder him in his journey to the Frankish kingdom.

In mid-November the Pope crossed the Great St Bernard Pass arriving at the Abbey of Saint-Maurice d'Agaune, where he was met by Pepin's archchaplain Fulrad, Abbot of Saint-Denis. Pepin sent his son Charles to escort the Pope to Ponthion, where Pepin and Stephen met on 6 January 754. It was at Ponthion that Pepin first agreed to defend "the rights of St. Peter" against the Lombards. Details would be worked out later at Quierzy. Pepin sent the Pope, tired from his journey, to the Abbey of Saint-Denis.

The condemnation of future Pope Formosus and others was announced to the emperor and a Synod of Ponthion in July 872, early in the pontificate of John VIII.

After Charles the Bald's coronation in 875, the new emperor summoned a great synod at Ponthion, which met in June 876, and at which a papal brief was read, appointing Ansegis, Archbishop of Sens, as Vicar Apostolic of Gaul and Germany. Hincmar, the recognized chief Metropolitan of the West Frankish kingdom (who wrote his treatise De jure metropolitanorum in defence of his rights as metropolitan), and nearly all the Frankish bishops made an energetic protest against what they considered an infringement on their rights, and refused to recognize the vicar, so that the latter could not exercise the rights which had been conferred upon him.

== See also ==
- Communes of the Marne department

== Sources ==
- Westermann, Großer Atlas zur Weltgeschichte (in German)
