= Mary the Younger =

Byzantine saint

Saint Mary the Younger (Greek: Μαρία ή Νέα, to distinguish her from Saint Mary of Egypt; 875 – 16 February 902) was a Byzantine saint of Armenian origin, the daughter of an Armenian noble. Some details of her life, including her following after the mid-10th century, are not known for certain; the text documenting some of her most noteworthy accomplishments was most likely written after 1025. It has been suggested that the Life of Mary is a parody of Gregory of Nyssa's Life of Macrina.

== Life ==
Her family originated from Greater Armenia, where her father was among the local grandees. They had settled in Constantinople, probably at the start of the reign of Basil I the Macedonian (r. 867–886), who called her father along with other Armenian grandees to enter his service. Maria was born in 875, probably in Constantinople, shortly after the death of her father. She had four older siblings, two brothers and two sisters; the latter were already married, indicating that Maria was a late child of her parents. She was raised by her mother, and as soon as she was of age (c. 888), she married the droungarios Nikephoros, an acquaintance of her brother-in-law Bardas Bratzes. Nikephoros distinguished himself in the 894–896 war against the Bulgarians, and was rewarded with a posting (probably as commander) to the division (tourma) of Bizye.

The couple had four sons: Orestes, born c. 889/90, who died at the age of five; Bardanes, born after Orestes' death, who himself died in c. 895/6; and the twins Baanes and Stephen, born between 897 and 900, of whom Baaners became a soldier and Stephen a monk, under the monastic name Symeon. Around 900 she was accused by the siblings of her husband, Helena and Alexios, of being profligate with money and of a liaison with their servant Demetrios. Mary vehemently denied these allegations, but Nikephoros posted a guard at her room and tortured her maidservant, Agathe, for interrogation. He furthermore removed the supervision of the household finances from Mary and gave it to the steward Drosos and a female servant, with express instructions not to give Mary any money. The latter was so distressed by her husband's treatment of her, that she developed a stomach ailment.

In 902, according to her hagiography, she expressed her disapproval that her husband, along with his siblings and servants, did not observe the fasting of Lent. Her disapproval was transmitted to Nikephoros in much exaggerated form, according to which she claimed that he was no real Christian, but a devil. Enraged, he tore Mary out of bed and beat her until someone intervened. As she tried to escape, she hit her head. She died ten days later, on 16 February, presumably of this head injury. Her funeral was led by the Bishop of Bizye, and was attended by almost the entire population of the town, who accompanied the funeral procession to the local cathedral, where she was buried. She appeared posthumously in many peoples' dreams and performed miracles by curing the sick and attacking invading soldiers. Though it was controversial at first, her husband ultimately built her a cathedral to house her corpse, which became the site of pilgrimage for many in the region who heard of her miracles. Her miracles and visionary capability solidified her status as a blessed Saint. In 927, her son Stephen had her corpse, which had been miraculously preserved until that time, removed from her wooden coffin and placed in the marble sarcophagus of his father, whose corpse on the other hand had rotted away and was reburied outside the church.

== Attributes ==
Mary the Younger was a symbol of female virtue. She is described as being merciful, having a pattern of divine love, and having high self-control. She also had duties as a wife and mother, while having a strong sense of loyalty to God. One of Mary the Younger's defining characteristics was that she was highly charitable. She would send money to a tax collector who eased punishment for those imprisoned for not being able to pay the diokete- which was a public tribute tax for housekeeping. In addition, she sought gold to help individuals who were suffering, and protected widows and orphans. From a strictly religious perspective, Mary the Younger was steadfast in her faith to God, even through times of struggle. For example, after her son Orestes died, she praised the Lord in a sincere manner for having let her experience this. From a perspective of gender, the fact that she had a “married” status was not a significant issue to those who admired her. At the same time, Mary the Younger was looked down upon and underestimated, particularly by males in high places of authority. One of the men who underestimated her was the Bishop of Bizye, who did not believe that a woman who died in a married state could perform miracles the way that a man could.

== Commentary ==
Byzantinist Stavroula Constantinou has used the theory of parody proposed by Linda Hutcheon to make the case for the anonymous Life of Mary being a parody of Gregory of Nyssa's Life of Macrina.

== Bibliography ==
=== Primary ===
- Laiou, Angeliki (1996). "Life of Saint Mary the Younger." In Alice-Mary Talbot (eds). Holy Women of Byzantium: Ten Saints’ Lives in English Translation. Dumbarton Oaks, pp. 239–89.
- Halsall, Paul and Laiou, Angeliki (trans.) (1997). "Medieval Sourcebook: Life of Mary the Younger, d.c.9032". In Paul Halsall (eds). Medieval Sourcebook Online. https://sourcebooks.fordham.edu/sbook.asp.

=== Secondary ===
- Constantinou, Stavroula (2010). "A Byzantine Hagiographical Parody: Life of Mary the Younger", Byzantine and Modern Greek Studies vol. 34. 2. pp. 160–181. DOI: 10.1179/030701310X12572436087370.
- Lilie, Ralph-Johannes; Ludwig, Claudia; Pratsch, Thomas; Zielke, Beate (2013). Prosopographie der mittelbyzantinischen Zeit Online. Berlin-Brandenburgische Akademie der Wissenschaften. Nach Vorarbeiten F. Winkelmanns erstellt (in German). Berlin and Boston: De Gruyter.
