= Xiao Hua (Tang dynasty) =

Chinese historian and politician

Xiao Hua (Chinese: 蕭華), formally the Duke of Xu (徐公), was a Chinese historian and politician during the Tang dynasty, serving as a chancellor during the reign of Emperor Suzong.

== Background ==
It is not known when Xiao Hua was born. He was from one of the most prominent families of Tang dynasty officialdom, having descended from the imperial clan of the Liang dynasty, and his father Xiao Song was a prominent chancellor and general during the reign of Emperor Xuanzong. Xiao Hua's brother Xiao Heng (蕭衡) married Emperor Xuanzong's daughter Princess Xinchang.

== During Emperor Xuanzong's reign ==
In 733, when Xiao Song was removed as chancellor (although still remaining as a high-ranked official) in the midst of his conflict with fellow chancellor Han Xiu (who was also removed as a result), Xiao Hua was made an imperial attendant (給事中, Jishizhong), and was soon promoted to be the deputy minister of public works (工部侍郎, Gongbu Shilang). After Xiao Song died in 749, Xiao Hua inherited the title of Duke of Xu. Toward the end of Emperor Xuanzong's Tianbao era (742–756), Xiao Hua was made the deputy minister of defense (兵部侍郎, Bingbu Shilang).

In 755, the general An Lushan rebelled at Fanyang Circuit (范陽, headquartered in modern Beijing), and soon established a state of Yan with him as emperor. In 756, with Yan forces approaching the Tang capital Chang'an, Emperor Xuanzong fled toward Chengdu. Most officials, including Xiao Hua, were unable to follow him, and Xiao Hua was captured by Yan forces. An made him the prefect of Wei Prefecture (魏州, in modern Handan, Hebei).

== During Emperor Suzong's reign ==
In 758, with Emperor Xuanzong's son Emperor Suzong then the emperor of Tang and An Lushan's son An Qingxu then the emperor of Yan, Tang forces recaptured Chang'an and Yan's capital Luoyang, forcing An Qingxu to flee to Yecheng, near Wei Prefecture. Nine Tang military governors (Jiedushi), led by Guo Ziyi, put Yecheng under siege. Xiao Hua sent secret correspondences to the Tang army agreeing to rise against Yan forces. His correspondences, however, were intercepted, and he was imprisoned. When the Tang general Cui Guangyuan (崔光遠) captured Wei Prefecture, he freed Xiao. It was said that the people of Wei Prefecture favored Xiao's governance and petitioned Emperor Suzong to let Xiao remain at Wei Prefecture, and Emperor Suzong agreed. However, when the Yan general Shi Siming—who briefly submitted to Tang but then turned against Tang again—advanced south toward Yecheng from Fanyang, Guo was uncertain about Xiao's loyalty and so summoned him to the Tang army camps, replacing him with Cui. Soon, in a confrontation with Shi's forces, Tang forces collapsed, and in the aftermaths, Xiao went back to Chang'an. He was still considered tainted by his service as a Yan official, and he was demoted to be the acting Mishu Shaojian (秘書少監)—the deputy director of the Palace Library. He was soon promoted to be Shangshu You Cheng (尚書右丞), one of the Secretaries General of the executive bureau of government (尚書省, Shangshu Sheng). In 759, he was made the mayor of Hezhong Municipality (河中, in modern Yuncheng, Shanxi) as well as the military governor of Hezhong Circuit (headquartered in Hezhong Municipality).

Around the new year 761, Xiao was recalled to Chang'an to serve as Zhongshu Shilang (中書侍郎)—the deputy head of the legislative bureau (中書省, Zhongshu Sheng). He was also given the designation Tong Zhongshu Menxia Pingzhangshi (同中書門下平章事), making him a chancellor de facto. He was also made an imperial scholar at Chongwen Pavilion (崇文館) and put in charge of editing the imperial history. In 761, when the powerful eunuch Li Fuguo wanted to be chancellor, and Emperor Suzong, who by this point was fearful of Li Fuguo, refused on the basis that he did not have the support of the officials, Li Fuguo tried to persuade the senior official Pei Mian to recommend him. Emperor Suzong told Xiao that if an important official (i.e., someone like Pei) recommended Li Fuguo, he would no longer have the excuse to refuse Li Fuguo's request. When Xiao subsequently discussed this with Pei, Pei's response was: "Surely I will not do this. My arm can be cut off before he can be chancellor."

Subsequently, Li Fuguo was not able to be chancellor while Emperor Suzong was alive, much to Li Fuguo's resentment, and Li Fuguo believed Xiao to be responsible. In 762, Li Fuguo accused Xiao of being power hungry, and repeatedly requested Emperor Suzong to remove Xiao. Emperor Suzong, apprehensive of Li Fuguo, removed Xiao from his chancellor position and made him the minister of rites (禮部尚書, Libu Shangshu), replacing him with Yuan Zai, at Li Fuguo's recommendation.

== During Emperor Daizong's reign ==
Emperor Suzong died shortly after, and he was succeeded by his son Emperor Daizong—who took the throne after Li Fuguo prevailed in a bloody conflict with Emperor Suzong's wife Empress Zhang in which Empress Zhang and Emperor Daizong's brother Li Xi (李係) the Prince of Yue were killed. Li Fuguo was (briefly) completely in control, and Yuan Zai, in order to flatter him, accused Xiao of crimes. Xiao was demoted to be the military advisor to the prefect of Xia Prefecture (峽州, in modern Yichang, Hubei). He died while still at Xia Prefecture. His grandsons Xiao Mian and Xiao Fang later served as chancellors as well, during the reigns of Emperor Muzong and Emperor Xizong, respectively.

== Notes and references ==
- Old Book of Tang, vol. 99.
- New Book of Tang, vol. 101.
- Zizhi Tongjian, vols. 220, 222.
