= Xiao Fang =

Chinese politician during the Tang dynasty

Xiao Fang (Chinese: 蕭倣; 796–875), courtesy name Sidao (思道), formally the Marquess of Lanling (蘭陵侯), was a Chinese politician during the Tang dynasty, serving as a chancellor during the reign of Emperor Xizong.

== Background ==
Xiao Fang was born in 796, during the reign of Emperor Dezong. He came from a prominent clan, descended from the imperial line of Liang Dynasty. Xiao Fang's great-grandfather Xiao Song and grandfather Xiao Hua both served as chancellors, as did his cousin Xiao Mian. Xiao Fang's father Xiao Wu (蕭悟) served as a judge at the supreme court. Xiao Fang himself passed the imperial examinations in the Jinshi class in 827, during the reign of Emperor Dezong's great-great-grandson Emperor Wenzong, and he entered governmental service thereafter.

== During Emperor Xuānzong's reign ==
During the Dazhong era (847-860) of Emperor Wenzong's uncle Emperor Xuānzong, Xiao Fang served successively as Jianyi Daifu (諫議大夫, an imperial consultant) and imperial attendant (給事中, Jishizhong). In 858, there was an occasion when Emperor Xuānzong was set to commission the imperial guard general Li Sui (李燧) as the military governor (Jiedushi) of Lingnan Circuit (嶺南, headquartered in modern Guangzhou, Guangdong), and had already sent an eunuch to Li Sui's mansion to bestow Li Sui with a staff signifying imperial authority. However, when Xiao received the edict commissioning Li Sui, he, per his authority as imperial attendant, sealed and returned the edict to Emperor Xuānzong, signifying his disagreement. (The reason for Xiao's disagreement is not stated in historical accounts.) Emperor Xuānzong, when he received the returned edict, was watching a play, but respecting Xiao's disagreement with the commission, he tried to send another eunuch to intercept the eunuch sent to Li Sui's mansion; he could not find one, so instead he sent a performer in the performance that he was watching, and the performer was able to stop the eunuch right in front of Li Sui's mansion. Instead of Li Sui, Emperor Xuānzong ultimately commissioned another general, Li Chengxun (李承勳), and Li Chengxun was able to suppress the rebellions that were then affecting Lingnan.

However, on a later occasion, Xiao Fang was accused of having improperly returned an edict to Emperor Xuānzong and was set to be punished. The assistant imperial scholar Kong Wenyu (孔溫裕) argued that Xiao should be encouraged for his review of edicts, and should not be punished; Emperor Xuānzong agreed and did not punish Xiao. Subsequently, there was a time when the powerful chancellor Linghu Tao recommended Li Zhuo (李涿) as the commandant of Annan (安南, i.e., modern northern Vietnam). Li Zhuo was subsequently removed for harshness, and Linghu then wanted to commission Li Zhuo as the governor (觀察使, Guanchashi) of Xuanshe Circuit (宣歙, headquartered in modern Xuancheng, Anhui). Xiao, not afraid of offending Linghu, submitted a petition opposing Li Zhuo's commission, and thus was much admired for his honesty. Later, Xiao was himself commissioned to be the military governor of Lingnan, and it was said that while there were many opportunities to collect valuable objects due to Lingnan being a key post for commerce, he refused to do so. On one occasion, when a family member was ill, and the physician ordered that plum be used in the medication; Xiao's attendants took plums that were in the government storage for this purpose, but when Xiao found out, he ordered that the plums be returned.

== During Emperor Yizong's reign ==
Early in the Xiantong era (860-874) of Emperor Xuānzong's son Emperor Yizong, Xiao Fang was recalled to the capital Chang'an to serve as Zuo Sanqi Changshi (左散騎常侍), a high-level advisory official at the examination bureau of government (門下省, Menxia Sheng). As he considered Emperor Yizong overly devout in Buddhism, in 862, he submitted a petition urging Emperor Yizong to cut back on his display of devotion. Emperor Yizong praised him for his advice, but did not follow it. In 863, he was put in charge of the imperial examinations for that year, and subsequently served successively as the deputy minister of rites (禮部侍郎, Libu Shilang) and deputy minister of census (戶部侍郎, Hubu Shilang). He later served for four years as the military governor of Yicheng Circuit (義成, headquartered in modern Anyang, Henan) and the prefect of Yicheng's capital Hua Prefecture (滑州). As Hua Prefecture was situated on the Yellow River, it often suffered from flooding. Xiao carried out a major project moving the course of the Yellow River to an old, more stable course. Emperor Yizong praised him for the project. He was then recalled to be the minister of defense (兵部尚書, Bingbu Shangshu) and the director of finances. He then served some time as the minister of civil service affairs (吏部尚書, Libu Shangshu) and in that capacity selected officials for commissions; he was said to be fair and capable in that capacity. At the end of the Xiantong era, he again became minister of defense and director of finances.

== During Emperor Xizong's reign ==
In 874, by which time Emperor Yizong had died and been succeeded by his young son Emperor Xizong, Xiao Fang, who was then referred to as Zuo Pushe (左僕射), one of the heads of the executive bureau (尚書省, Shangshu Sheng), was made Menxia Shilang (門下侍郎), the deputy head of the examination bureau, and given the designation Tong Zhongshu Menxia Pingzhangshi (同中書門下平章事), making him a chancellor de facto. He was subsequently given the honorific title of Sikong (司空, one of the Three Excellencies) and created the Marquess of Lanling. He died in 875.

== Notes and references ==
- Old Book of Tang, vol. 172.
- New Book of Tang, vol. 101.
- Zizhi Tongjian, vols. 249, 250, 252.
