= Ansegisus of Sens =

Benedictine monk

Ansegisus (the Latinized form of Ansegis) was a Benedictine monk, Abbot of St. Michael's, at Beauvais, and in 871 became Archbishop of Sens.

After Pope John VIII crowned Charles the Bald the Emperor, he asked the Pope to appoint Ansegisus papal legate and primate over Gaul and Germany. With a papal legate of French nationality, amicably disposed towards the Emperor, Charles the Bald thought he could more easily extend his influence as emperor over those countries. The Pope yielded to Charles' wish, but when the bishops, assembled at the Synod of Ponthion, were asked to acknowledge the primacy of Ansegisus, they protested, especially Hincmar, Archbishop of Reims, against what they considered an infringement on their rights. Though Ansegisus retained the title, it is doubtful whether he ever exercised the powers of Primate of France and Germany.

Ansegisus died on 25 November 879 or 883.
