= Imperial Regalia =

Imperial Regalia may refer to:

- Imperial Regalia of the Holy Roman Empire
- Imperial Regalia of Japan
- Imperial Regalia of Brazil
