= Xiao Mian =

Tang Chinese politician

Xiao Mian (Chinese: 蕭俛; died March 16, 842), courtesy name Siqian (思謙), noble title Duke of Xu (徐公), was a Chinese politician of the Tang dynasty, serving as a chancellor during the reign of Emperor Muzong. In traditional histories, he was praised for his integrity but blamed for faulty decisions that led to the imperial government's loss of control over the circuits north of the Yellow River.

== Background ==
It is not known when Xiao Mian was born. His family was prominent, having been descended from the imperial house of Liang dynasty, and his grandfather Xiao Hua, great-grandfather Xiao Song, and Xiao Song's great-granduncle Xiao Yu had all served as chancellors during Tang dynasty. Xiao Mian's father Xiao Heng (蕭恆) served as an imperial censor. Xiao Mian passed the imperial examinations in 791, during the reign of Emperor Dezong. (Also passing the imperial examinations that year were Huangfu Bo and Linghu Chu, and the three developed a deep friendship.)

== During Emperor Xianzong's reign ==
In 806, during the reign of Emperor Dezong's grandson Emperor Xianzong, Xiao Mian passed a special examination for those with strategic recommendations, and was thereafter made a consultant at the legislative bureau of government (中書省, Zhongshu Sheng), initially at the low post of You Shiyi (右拾遺) and then promoted to You Bujue (右補闕). In 811, he was made an imperial scholar (翰林學士, Hanlin Xueshi) in addition to his post as You Bujue. In 812, in addition to being imperial scholar, he was moved from the You Bujue post to be Sifeng Yuanwailang (司封員外郎), a low-level official at the ministry of civil service affairs (吏部, Lìbu). In 814, he was made Jiabu Langzhong (駕部郎中), a supervisorial official at the ministry of rites (禮部, Lǐbu, note different tone than the ministry of civil service affairs), but continued to serve as imperial scholar, and was also given the responsibility of drafting imperial edicts.

In 814, when Emperor Xianzong was in the middle of a campaign against the warlord Wu Yuanji, who controlled Zhangyi Circuit (彰義, headquartered in modern Zhumadian, Henan), the pro-campaign chancellor Li Jifu died. Xiao's friend, the official Zhang Zhongfang (張仲方), citing Li Jifu's support for the campaign, which Zhang considered imprudent, opposed the highly honorific posthumous name of Jingxian (敬憲, "alert and knowledgeable") for Li. Viewing this as a criticism against himself, Emperor Xianzong demoted Zhang, but nevertheless changed Li's posthumous name to Zhongyi (忠懿, "faithful and benevolent"). Xiao was considered an associate of Zhang's, and Emperor Xianzong thus stripped Xiao of his imperial scholar status and made the deputy minister of husbandry (太僕少卿, Taipu Shaoqing). Nevertheless, many officials remained against the campaign, including Xiao and the imperial scholar Qian Hui (錢徽). In 816, Emperor Xianzong, as a warning against those speaking against the campaign, removed Qian and Xiao from their responsibilities as imperial scholar and drafter of edicts, respectively, but let them stay in their main posts but away from the emperor.

By 818, Xiao's friend Huangfu Bo, due to his ability to garner revenues for Emperor Xianzong, was greatly favored by Emperor Xianzong and was made a chancellor. Huangfu recommended Linghu Chu to be chancellor as well, and both Huangfu and Linghu thereafter often recommended Xiao. As a result, Xiao was favored by Emperor Xianzong as well, and received a number of honorific titles. He was also made the deputy chief imperial censor (御史中丞, Yushi Zhongcheng). It was deputy chief imperial censor that in 818, he submitted an indictment against the eunuch Yang Chaowen (楊朝汶), who had arrested over 1,000 people for allegedly owing money to the palace. As a result of the indictment that Xiao submitted, which the chancellors Pei Du and Cui Qun also supported, Emperor Xianzong ordered Yang to commit suicide.

== During Emperor Muzong's and Emperor Jingzong's reigns ==
Emperor Xianzong died in spring 820 and was succeeded by his son Emperor Muzong. Emperor Muzong, who disliked Huangfu Bo, immediately exiled Huangfu. Subsequently, when he considered whom to make chancellor, Linghu Chu recommended Xiao Mian. Thereafter, Xiao was made Zhongshu Shilang (中書侍郎)—the deputy head of the legislative bureau—and chancellor de facto with the title Tong Zhongshu Menxia Pingzhangshi (同中書門下平章事), along with Duan Wenchang. Thereafter, Emperor Muzong considered killing Huangfu, but Xiao and the eunuchs interceded, and Huangfu was not killed.

It was said that, as chancellor, Xiao was humble and careful, and he tried to do what was righteous and hated the wicked. He was also said to be filially pious, and he served his mother Lady Wei carefully as an ordinary son would despite his honored chancellor status. Further, when Emperor Muzong ordered him to draft the text of a monument for the deceased warlord Wang Shizhen (presumably to please Wang Shizhen's son Wang Chengyuan, who had become a faithful imperial subject), Xiao refused, arguing that Wang Shizhen was unfaithful to the imperial government and that he could not bear to draft such a text. However, he and Duan were blamed for a major policy error at that time. Both he and Duan thought that the realm had been permanently pacified after Emperor Xianzong's campaigns against warlords, which destroyed many warlords and caused others to agree to follow imperial orders. He and Duan submitted a proposal that secret orders be sent to each army, ordering them to reduce armies by forced attrition—such that each army was required to reduce its size by 8% each year by desertions or death. As Emperor Muzong, new to the throne, was spent much of his time in drinking and feasting, he did not see the problems with this proposal and approved it. The soldiers removed from army ranks as a result gathered as bandits as a result, and later, when Lulong (盧龍, headquartered in modern Beijing) and Chengde (成德, headquartered in modern Shijiazhuang, Hebei) Circuits rebelled under the leadership of Zhu Kerong and Wang Tingcou respectively in 821 (by which time Xiao was no longer chancellor), the former soldiers joined Lulong and Chengde forces in droves, and as they were experienced soldiers and the soldiers that the imperial armies were forced to gather quickly in response were inexperienced, the Lulong and Chengde forces eventually prevailed over imperial forces despite a major numerical disadvantage—with Lulong and Chengde having less than 20,000 soldiers combined and the imperial forces numbering 150,000.

In spring 821, Wang Bo the military governor (jiedushi) of Xichuan Circuit (西川, headquartered in modern Chengdu, Sichuan) submitted much tribute to Emperor Muzong and also bribed the powerful eunuchs, hoping to be chancellor. Duan also spoke on Wang's behalf. Xiao opposed vehemently, stating that Wang was "delicate and wicked" and should not be chancellor. When Emperor Muzong disagreed, Xiao offered to resign. After Wang was summoned to Chang'an, Xiao was removed from his chancellor position and made You Pushe (右僕射), one of the heads of the executive bureau (尚書省, Shangshu Sheng). Xiao considered himself to have served as chancellor for too brief of a period to serve this highly honorific position, and thus declined, and was instead made the minister of civil service affairs (吏部尚書, Lìbu Shangshu). He was also created the Duke of Xu. As the minister of civil service affairs required conducting much tedious work, Xiao felt the position unfit for his lifestyle, and also declined it. In winter 821, he was made the minister of defense (兵部尚書, Bingbu Shangshu). In 822, he offered to be assigned to the eastern capital Luoyang after claiming an illness, but that offer was not accepted initially, although soon thereafter, he was made an advisor to the Crown Prince, and then sent out of Chang'an to serve as the prefect of Tong Prefecture (同州, in modern Weinan, Shaanxi).

== During Emperor Wenzong's and Emperor Wuzong's reigns ==
In 826, by which time Emperor Muzong's son Emperor Jingzong was emperor, Xiao Mian was again made an advisor to the Crown Prince, and sent out to have his office at Luoyang. After Emperor Jingzong died later that year and was succeeded by his brother Emperor Wenzong, Emperor Wenzong recalled Xiao to serve as acting Zuo Puye (左僕射), the other head of the executive bureau, as well as advisor to the crown prince. Xiao claimed an illness and declined to report to Chang'an; Emperor Wenzong thereafter allowed him to retire.

Around this time, Xiao's mother Lady Wei died, and he observed a period of mourning for her. After the period of mourning was over, Emperor Wenzong again tried to recall him, but he again declined based on claim of illness. As he still considered Luoyang to be too busy of a place, and particularly did not want to be receiving guests all the time, he went to live at his vacation mansion at Jiyuan, and it was said that he enjoyed life in the hills. In 834, by which time Emperor Wenzong had created his son Li Yong crown prince, he again tried to recall Xiao to serve as advisor to Li Yong. Xiao sent his brother Xiao Jie (蕭傑) to Chang'an with his petition declining the post. Emperor Wenzong accepted his petition and allowed him to remain in retirement. He died in 842.

== Notes and references ==
- Old Book of Tang, vol. 172.
- New Book of Tang, vol. 101.
- Zizhi Tongjian, vols. 237, 239, 240, 241, 242.
