= Adelaide of Paris =

Queen of the West Franks from 877 to 879

Adelaide
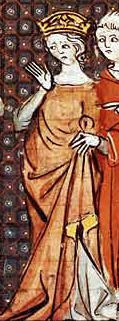

Queen consort of the West Franks
- Tenure: 6 October 877 – 10 April 879
- Born: c. 850/853
- Died: 10 November 901 (aged 47–51)
- Burial: Saint-Corneille Abbey, Compiègne
- Spouse: Louis the Stammerer (m. 875; died 879)
- Issue: Charles the Simple; Ermentrude
- Father: Adalard of Paris, Marquis of Friuli

Adélaïde of Paris (Aélis) (German: Adelheid von Friaul; c. 850/853 – 10 November 901) was a Frankish queen. She was the second wife of Louis the Stammerer, King of West Francia and mother of Charles the Simple.

== Life ==
Adelaide was daughter of the count palatine Adalard of Paris. She was chosen by Charles the Bald, King of Western Francia, to marry his son and heir, Louis the Stammerer, despite the fact that Louis had secretly married Ansgarde of Burgundy against the wishes of his father. Although Louis and Ansgarde already had two children, Louis and Carloman, Charles prevailed upon Pope John VIII, to dissolve the union. This accomplished, Charles married his son to Adelaide in February 875. However, the marriage was called into question because of the close blood-kinship of the pair. When on 7 September 878 the pope crowned Louis (who had succeeded his father in the previous year), the pope refused to crown Adelaide.

When Louis the Stammerer died in Compiegne on 10 April 879, Adelaide was pregnant, giving birth on 17 September 879, to Charles the Simple. The birth of this child led to a dispute between Adelaide and Ansgarde. Ansgarde and her sons accused Adelaide of adultery; Adelaide in turn disputed the right of Ansgarde's sons to inherit. Eventually, Adelaide succeeded in winning the case; but despite this, Ansgarde's sons Louis and Carloman remained kings until their deaths without heirs in 882 and 884, respectively, with the crown then being contested between Odo, Count of Paris and Charles the Fat.

Charles eventually succeeded to his father's throne in 898; his mother assisted in crowning him.

== Death ==
Adelaide died in Laon on 10 November 901 and was buried in the Abbey of Saint-Corneille, Compiègne, Picardy.

== Sources ==
- McDougall, Sara (2017). Royal Bastards: The Birth of Illegitimacy, 800-1230. Oxford University Press.
- McKitterick, Rosamond (1999). The Frankish Kingdoms under the Carolingians. Pearson Education Limited.
- Nelson, Janet L. (2005). "The Frankish Kingdoms, 814-898: The West". In McKitterick, Rosamond (ed.). New Cambridge Medieval History. Vol. II: c.700 - c.900. Cambridge University Press. pp. 110–141. ISBN 0-521-36292-X.
- Venning, Timothy, ed. (2023). A Compendium of World Sovereigns. Vol. II: Medieval. Routledge.

Preceded by Richilde of Provence	Queen of Western Francia; 877–879	Succeeded by Richardis
