= Stavroula Constantinou =

Cypriot academic

Stavroula Constantinou (born 1975) is a Cypriot academic who specialises in Byzantine literature.

== Biography ==
She was born in Dhekelia Cantonment, Sovereign Base Areas of Akrotiri and Dhekelia in 1975. She studied Byzantine, Western Medieval and Modern Greek Literature at the University of Cyprus from 1992 to 1996, the Free University of Berlin from 1997 to 1999 and the University of Cambridge from 1999 to 2004. Constantinou was also at the Free University of Berlin from 2000 to 2003 and was awarded a doctorate of philosophy degree in Byzantine Literature from that institution.

Constantinou has taught Byzantine philology at the University of Cyprus since 2004. She was at the Free University once more for 2010–11 as an Alexander von Humboldt Foundation fellow. Constantinou's fields of research include hagiography, Byzantine literary genres, poetry, performances and feminism and she has published 20 scholarly articles. She has published two books: Female corporeal performances : reading the body in Byzantine passions and lives of holy women in 2005 and Court ceremonies and rituals of power in Byzantium and the medieval Mediterranean : comparative perspectives in 2013. Constantinou is a member of the European Cultural Parliament.
