= Battle of Dollar =

Battle between Scottish and Viking forces (875 AD)

- Part of the Viking invasions of Scotland
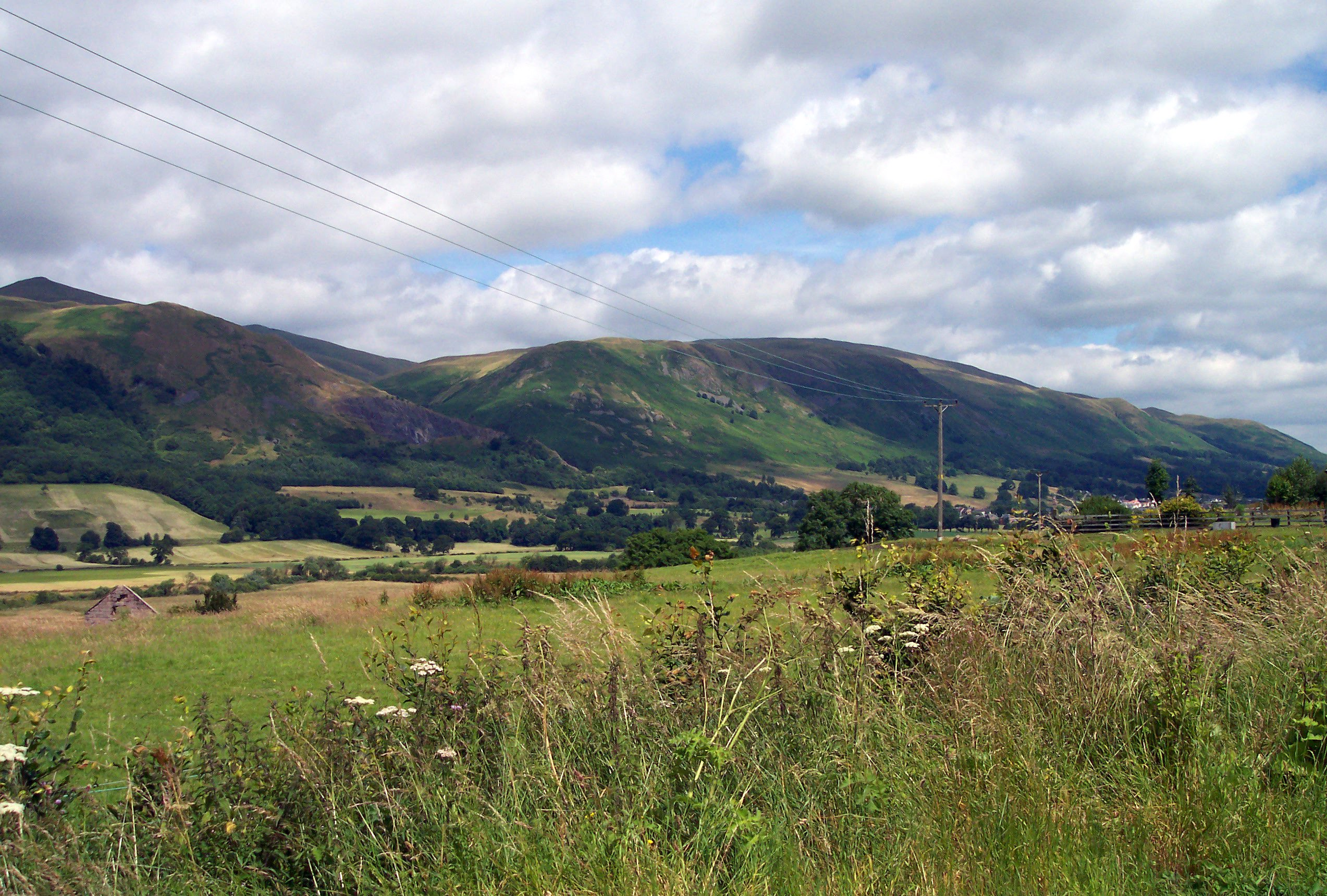
- The Ochil Hills as seen from south-west of Tillicoultry
Date	875
Location	Dollar, Scotland 56°09′43″N 3°40′26″W
Result	Viking victory

Belligerents
Kingdom of Scotland	Vikings

Commanders and leaders
King Constantine I	Halfdan Ragnarsson
- Location of Dollar within modern Clackmannanshire

The Battle of Dollar was fought in 875 at Dollar, Scotland, between Viking invaders under Halfdan Ragnarsson and the defenders led by King Constantine I. The Vikings had previously been part of the Great Heathen Army which had been assaulting the Anglo-Saxon kingdoms of England before moving to a base by the river Tyne to raid the lands of the Picts and Strathclyde Britons.

The battle ended in victory for the Vikings who occupied the east-central lowlands of Scotland for a year before settling in Northumbria. Constantine was forced back to the highlands of Atholl and would later die in a further battle with the Vikings in 876. The Picts disappear from the record after the devastation of 875–878.

== Background ==
The first Viking raids in Scotland targeted the community of Iona which was attacked four times between 795 and 825. This threat encouraged the union of the Picts and Scots with Kenneth MacAlpin becoming the first king to rule both from 843. Kenneth's son Constantine I would succeed to the throne in 862 after the death of Constantine's uncle, Donald I.

The Great Heathen Army invaded England in 865 with Halfdan Ragnarsson among their leaders, taking York in 867. After invading the other Anglo-Saxon kingdoms, the army divided in 874 and Halfdan took his forces to a base on the Tyne from where he raided the Picts and the Kingdom of Strathclyde.

== Battle ==
Constantine was defeated by Halfdan at Dollar in modern Clackmannanshire. The Scottish Chronicle gives the location, and states "the Scots were annihilated at Atholl". The Annals of Ulster states "the Picts encountered the dark foreigners [the Danes] in battle and a great slaughter of the Picts resulted".

The battle of Dollar is the first time the Scottish Chronicle uses the word Scoti, used when describing the defeated force.

== Aftermath ==
Following his defeat, Constantine was driven back to the highlands of Atholl, with the east-central lowlands occupied by the Vikings for a year. Constantine was killed by Vikings in another battle known as inber dub fáta ('long dark river-mouth') in 876. This may refer to Inverdovat in Fife. Constantine was succeeded by his brother Áed, after a possible year-long interregnum. Constantine and Aed were the last rulers to be referred to as kings of the Picts, and the Picts disappear from the historical record after the devastation suffered in 875–878.

According to the Anglo-Saxon Chronicle Halfdan's army settled in Northumbria in 876 where they "proceeded to plough and to support themselves". Halfdan did not settle with the army and is recorded as being active in Ireland, where he was killed in 877 at the battle of Strangford Lough.

== Sources ==
- Archibald, Malcolm (2016). Dance If Ye Can: A Dictionary of Scottish Battles. Creativia. ISBN 978-1536821796.
- Britannica. "Scotland - The unification of the kingdom". Britannica.
- Broun, Dauvit (2001). "Constantine I (Caustantín mac Cinaeda Constantine I)". The Oxford Companion to Scottish History. Oxford University Press. ISBN 978-0-19-923482-0.
- Broun, Dauvit (2004). "Constantine I [Causantín mac Cinaeda]". Oxford Dictionary of National Biography (online ed.). Oxford University Press. doi:10.1093/ref:odnb/6114. (Subscription, Wikipedia Library access or UK public library membership required.)
- Costambeys, Marios (2004). "Hálfdan [Healfdene]". Oxford Dictionary of National Biography (online ed.). Oxford University Press. doi:10.1093/ref:odnb/49260. (Subscription, Wikipedia Library access or UK public library membership required.)
- Knox, William (9 September 2014). Scottish History For Dummies. John Wiley & Sons. ISBN 978-1-118-67615-8.
