= Louis the Stammerer =

King of West Francia from 877 to 879

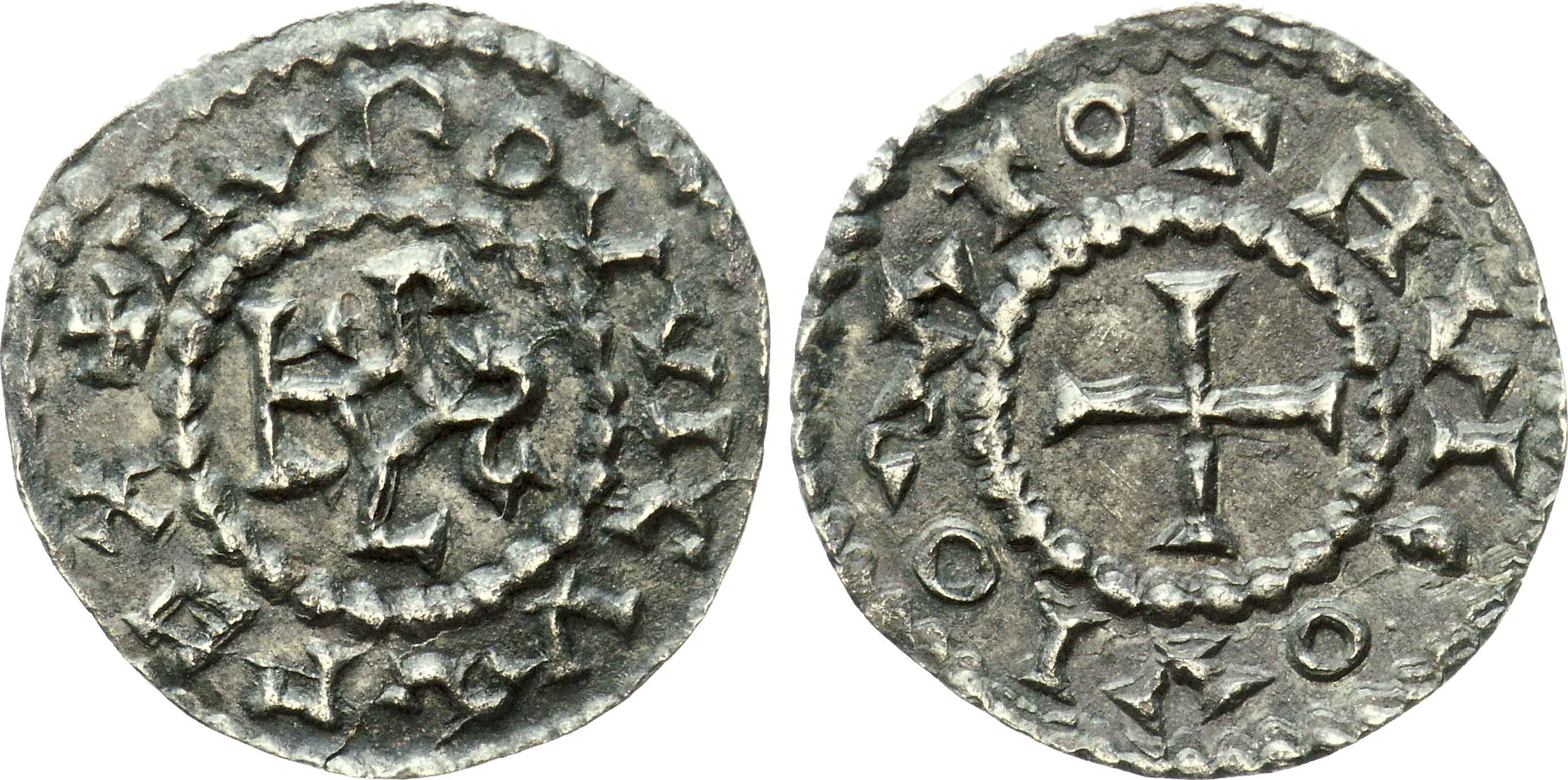
- Denier of Louis the Stammerer

King of West Francia
- Reign: 877–879
- Coronation: 8 October 877 in Compiègne
- Predecessor: Charles the Bald
- Successor: Louis III; Carloman II; Boso (rebelled)

King of Aquitaine
- Reign: 866 – 867
- Predecessor: Charles the Child
- Successor: Office briefly abolished (Charles the Fat)
- Born: 1 November 846
- Died: 10 April 879 (aged 32); Compiègne
- Burial: Saint-Corneille Abbey, Compiègne, France
- Spouses: Ansgarde of Burgundy; Adelaide of Paris
- Issue Detail: Louis III of France; Carloman II; Ermentrude of France; Charles the Simple
- Dynasty: Carolingian
- Father: Charles the Bald
- Mother: Ermentrude of Orléans

Louis II the Stammerer (French: Louis le Bègue; 1 November 846 – 10 April 879) was the king of Aquitaine and later the king of West Francia. He was the eldest son of Emperor Charles the Bald and Ermentrude of Orléans. Louis II the Stammerer was physically weak and outlived his father by a year and a half.

In 866, Louis II succeeded his younger brother Charles the Child as the ruler of Aquitaine. In 877, he succeeded his father as ruler of the entire West Francia, including Lower Burgundy with Provence, but without rule over Italy. Thus, he did not become the emperor. He was crowned king of West Francia on 8 October 877 by Hincmar, archbishop of Reims, at Compiegne and was crowned a second time in August 878 by Pope John VIII at Troyes while the pope was attending a council there. The pope may have even offered him the imperial crown, but it was declined. Louis II had relatively little impact on politics. He was described as "a simple and sweet man, a lover of peace, justice, and religion". In 878, he gave the counties of Barcelona, Girona, and Besalú to Wilfred the Hairy. His final act was to march against the invading Vikings, but he fell ill and died on 10 April 879 at Compiègne, not long after beginning this final campaign.

On his death, his realms were divided between his two sons, Carloman II and Louis III, while powerful duke Boso of Provence tried to carve out a realm in Lower Burgundy.

== Family ==
Domains of King Louis II the Stammerer in Western Francia, including Western Lotharingia and Lower Burgundy with Provence (all in orange)

During the peace negotiations between his father and Erispoe, duke of Brittany, Louis II was betrothed to a daughter of Erispoe in 856. The daughter's name is not known, nor is it known if this was the same daughter who later married Gurivant. The contract was broken in 857 after Erispoe's murder.

Louis II was married twice. His first wife Ansgarde of Burgundy had two sons: Louis III (born in 863) and Carloman II (born in 866), both of whom became kings of West Francia, and three daughters: Hildegarde (born in 864), Gisela (865–884).

By his second wife, Adelaide of Paris, he had Ermentrude (874–914) and a posthumous child, Charles the Simple, who became, long after his elder brothers' deaths, king of West Francia.

With his first wife, Ansgarde of Burgundy, Louis had the following children:

- Louis III of France
- Carloman II
- Hildegarde (born in 864)
- Gisela (865–884)

With his second wife, Adelaide of Paris, Louis had:

- Charles III the Simple
- Ermentrude (874–914)

== Epithet ==
Louis II's epithet of 'the Stammerer' is first recorded in the chronicle of Regino of Prüm, who says he "was called ‘the Stammerer’ because he was somewhat impeded and slow in speech".

== Sources ==
- Bak, János M. (1990). Coronations: Medieval and Early Modern Monarchic Ritual. University of California.
- Lößlein, Horst (2019). Royal Power in the Late Carolingian Age: Charles III the Simple and His Predecessors. Modern Academic Publishing.
- MacLean, Simon (2001). "The Carolingian response to the revolt of Boso, 879–887". French Historical Studies. 10 (1): 21–48. doi:10.1111/1468-0254.00078.
- McKitterick, Rosamond (1983). The Frankish Kingdoms Under the Carolingians, 751-987. Harlow: Longman. ISBN 978-0-582-49005-5.
- Riché, Pierre (1993). The Carolingians: A Family Who Forged Europe. Philadelphia: University of Pennsylvania Press. ISBN 0-8122-1342-4.
- Riché, Pierre (2002). "John VIII". In Levillain, Philippe (ed.). The Papacy: Gaius-Proxies. Vol. 2. Routledge.
- West, Charles (2023). The Fall of a Carolingian Kingdom: Lotharingia, 855–869. Toronto: University of Toronto Press. ISBN 978-1-4875-4518-5.

Louis the Stammerer Carolingian dynasty Born: 1 November 846 Died: 10 April 879
Regnal titles
Preceded by Charles the Child	King of Aquitaine; 866–877	Vacant Title next held by Ranulf II
Preceded by Charles the Bald	King of Neustria; 856–879	Succeeded by Louis III
Preceded by Charles the Bald	King of West Francia; 877–879	Succeeded by Louis III and Carloman
Preceded by Charles the Bald	King of Provence; 877–879	Succeeded by Boso of Provence
New title	Count of Meaux; 862–877	Succeeded by Theodebert
