= Ermentrude (daughter of Louis the Stammerer) =

Daughter of Louis the Stammerer

Ermentrude (French: Ermentrude de France; 875/78–?) was a Princess of France in the Middle Ages, named after her grandmother, Queen Ermentrude of Orléans.

Ermentrude was a daughter of King Louis the Stammerer and Adelaide of Paris.

Ermentrude’s daughter, Cunigunda, first in 909 married Wigeric of Lotharingia, count of Bidgau and count palatine of Lotharingia, then in 922 married Ricwin, Count of Verdun (d. 923).

== Sources ==
- Lößlein, Horst (2019). Royal Power in the Late Carolingian Age: Charles III the Simple and His Predecessors. Modern Academic Publishing.
