= Rijnwaarden =

- Former municipality
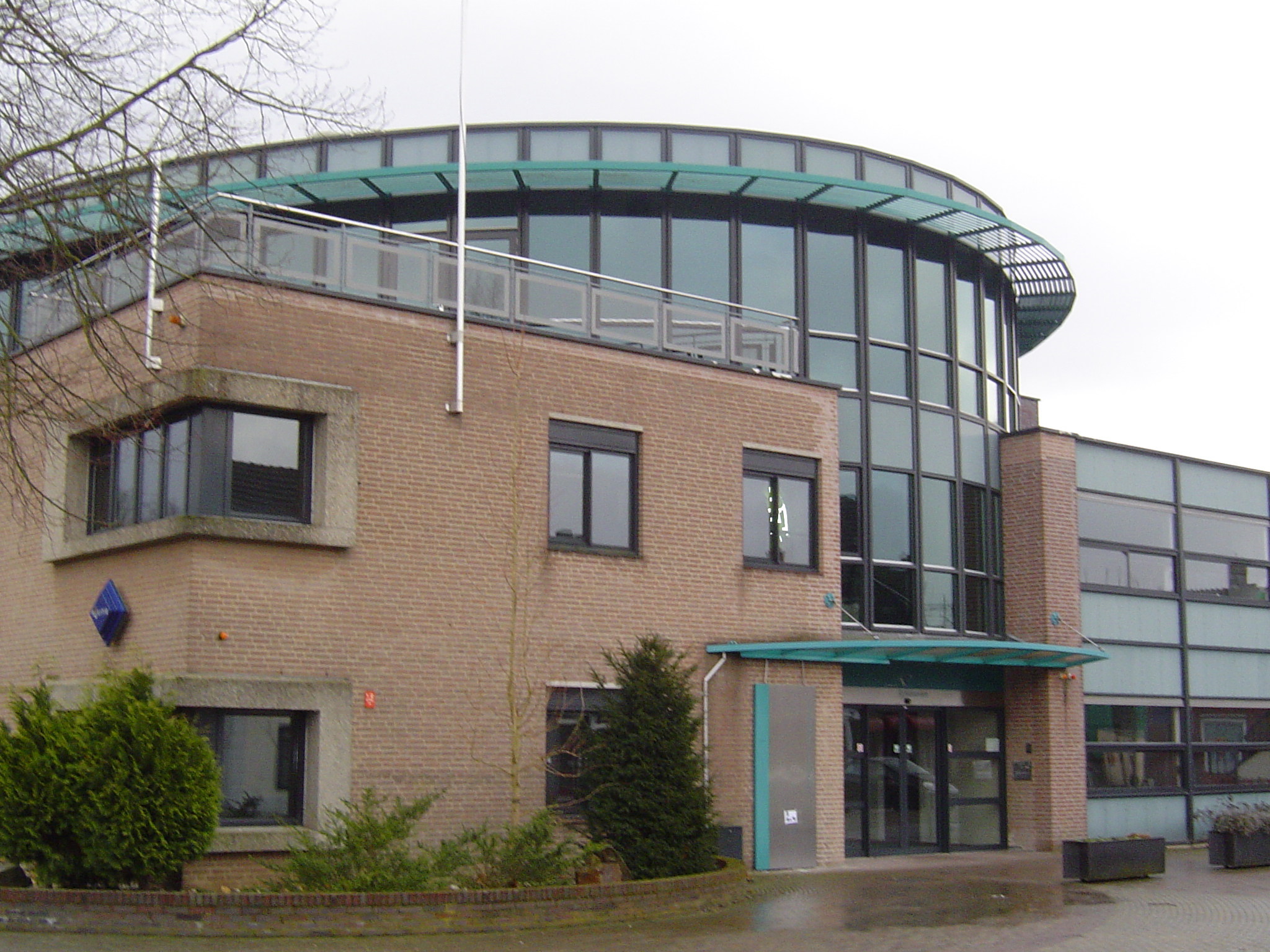
- Rijnwaarden town hall

- Flag Coat of arms

- Location in Gelderland
- Coordinates: 51°52′N 6°7′E
- Country: Netherlands
- Province: Gelderland
- Municipality: Zevenaar
- Established: 1985

Area
  - Total: 48.08 km^{2} (18.56 sq mi)
  - Land: 39.84 km^{2} (15.38 sq mi)
  - Water: 8.24 km^{2} (3.18 sq mi)
- Elevation: 15 m (49 ft)

Population
  - Total: Included with Zevenaar
- Time zone: UTC+1 (CET)
  - Summer (DST): UTC+2 (CEST)
- Postcode: 6910–6917
- Area code: 0316
- Website: www.rijnwaarden.nl

Rijnwaarden (Dutch pronunciation: [rɛiɱˈʋaːrdə(n)]) was a municipality in the province of Gelderland, in the eastern Netherlands. The Rhine enters the Netherlands at its location. Rijnwaarden was merged into the municipality of Zevenaar on 1 January 2018.

== Population centres ==
- Aerdt
- Herwen
- Lobith
- Pannerden
- Spijk
- Tolkamer

=== Topography ===
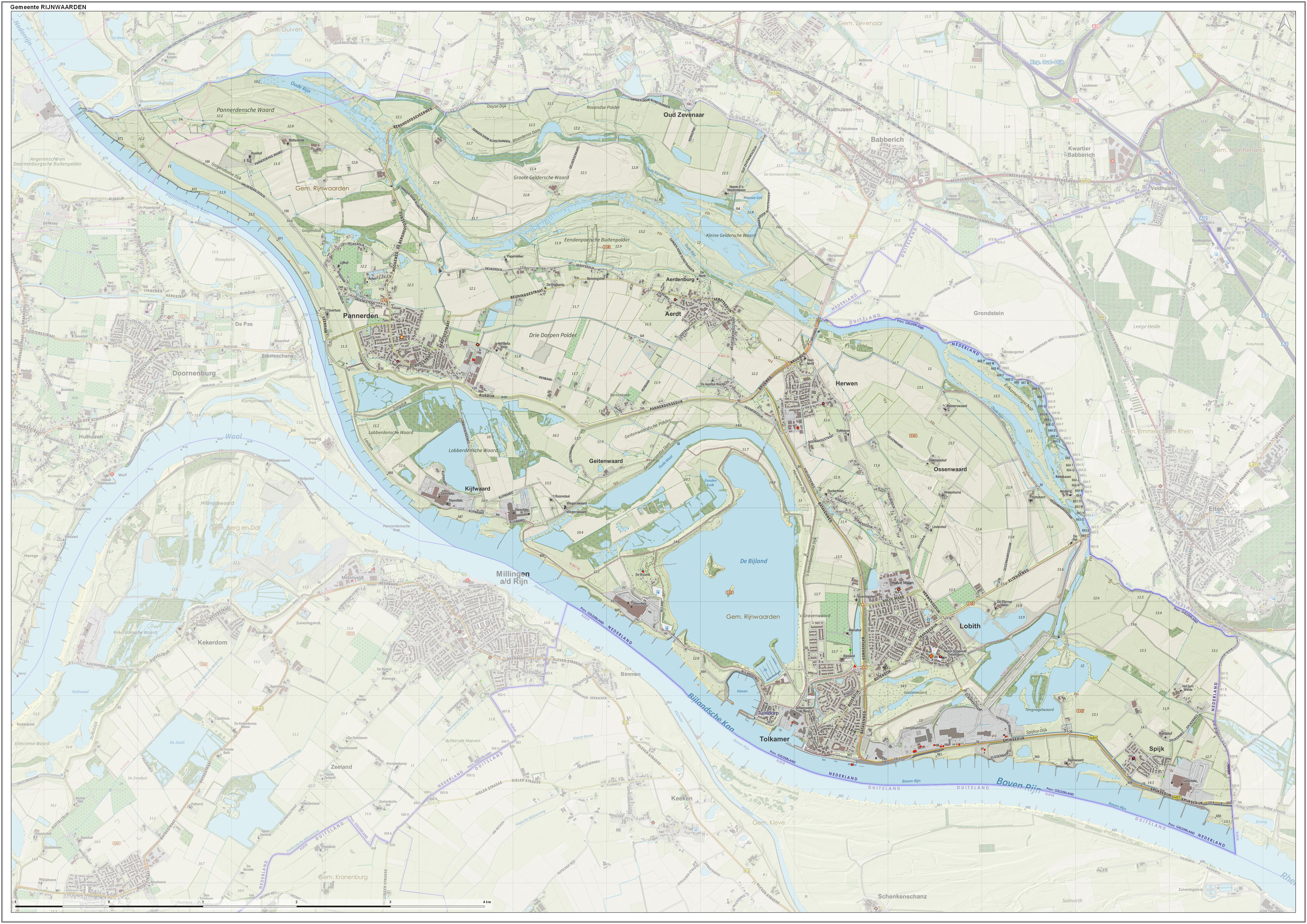

Map of the former municipality of Rijnwaarden, June 2015
