= Herwen en Aerdt =

- Former municipality
- Flag Coat of arms

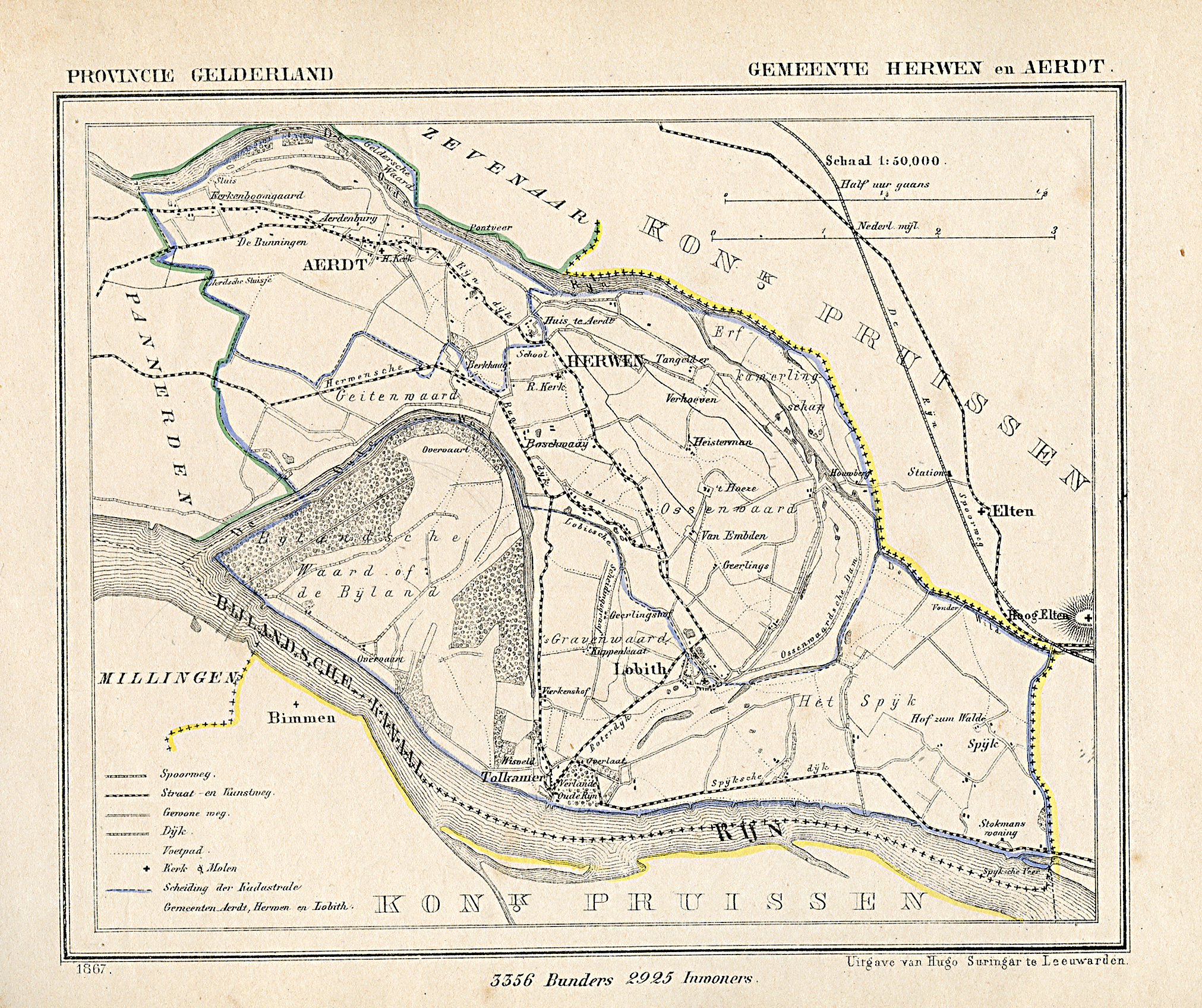
- Herwen en Aerdt (1867)

- Location within Netherlands
- Coordinates: 51°53′N 6°6′E
- Country: Netherlands
- Province: Gelderland
- Established: 1818

Area
  - Total: 2.754 km^{2} (1.063 sq mi)

Population
  - Total: 8,124
- Time zone: UTC+1 (CET)
  - Summer (DST): UTC+2 (CEST)
- Dissolved: 1985
- Today part of: Zevenaar

Herwen en Aerdt is a former municipality in the Dutch province of Gelderland. It existed from 1818 to 1985, when it became part of the new municipality of Rijnwaarden. In 2018, Rijnwaarden became part of the municipality of Zevenaar

The municipality covered villages like Herwen, Aerdt, Lobith, Spijk and Tolkamer, and the surrounding area.

== Notable people ==
- Clemens Cornielje (b. 1958), politician
- Jan van Aken (b. 1961), writer
- Jeroen van Veen (b. 1969), pianist
- Theo van de Klundert (b. 1936), economist
