= Jan Hendrikx (politician, born 1941) =

Dutch politician (1941–2024)

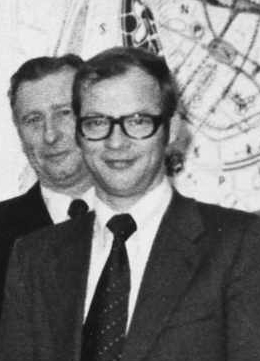
- Hendrikx in 1973
- Born: Jan Andreas Marie Hendrikx; 27 May 1941; Brunssum, German-occupied Netherlands
- Died: 29 November 2024 (aged 83); Wijchen, Netherlands
- Occupation: Politician

Jan Andreas Marie Hendrikx (27 May 1941 – 29 November 2024) was a Dutch politician. He was a member of the Catholic People's Party (KVP) and from 1980 of the Christian Democratic Appeal (CDA). Hendrikx was Queen's commissioner in Overijssel and served as a member of the Senate.

== Life and career ==
Hendrikx was a member of the provincial council for 12 years from 1970 to 1982. Within that time Hendrikx served as the mayor of Herwen en Aerdt (1972–1974) and a member of the provincial executive of Gelderland. He was at the time the youngest mayor of the Netherlands. He was a senior civil servant at the Ministry of the Interior and from 1988 to 2002 Queen's Commissioner in Overijssel. As Queen's Commissioner, he successfully led efforts in 1995 to protect Overijssel from flooding due to the extremely high water level in the Dutch rivers. He was Queen's Commissioner at the time of the Enschede fireworks disaster. Later Hendrikx served as a member of the Senate from 12 June 2007 to 7 June 2011. In the Senate, Hendrikx was involved in matters including domestic affairs, transport and water management, environment and Antillean Affairs.

Hendrikx died on 29 November 2024, at the age of 83.
