= Jan van Aken (writer) =

Dutch writer (born 1961)

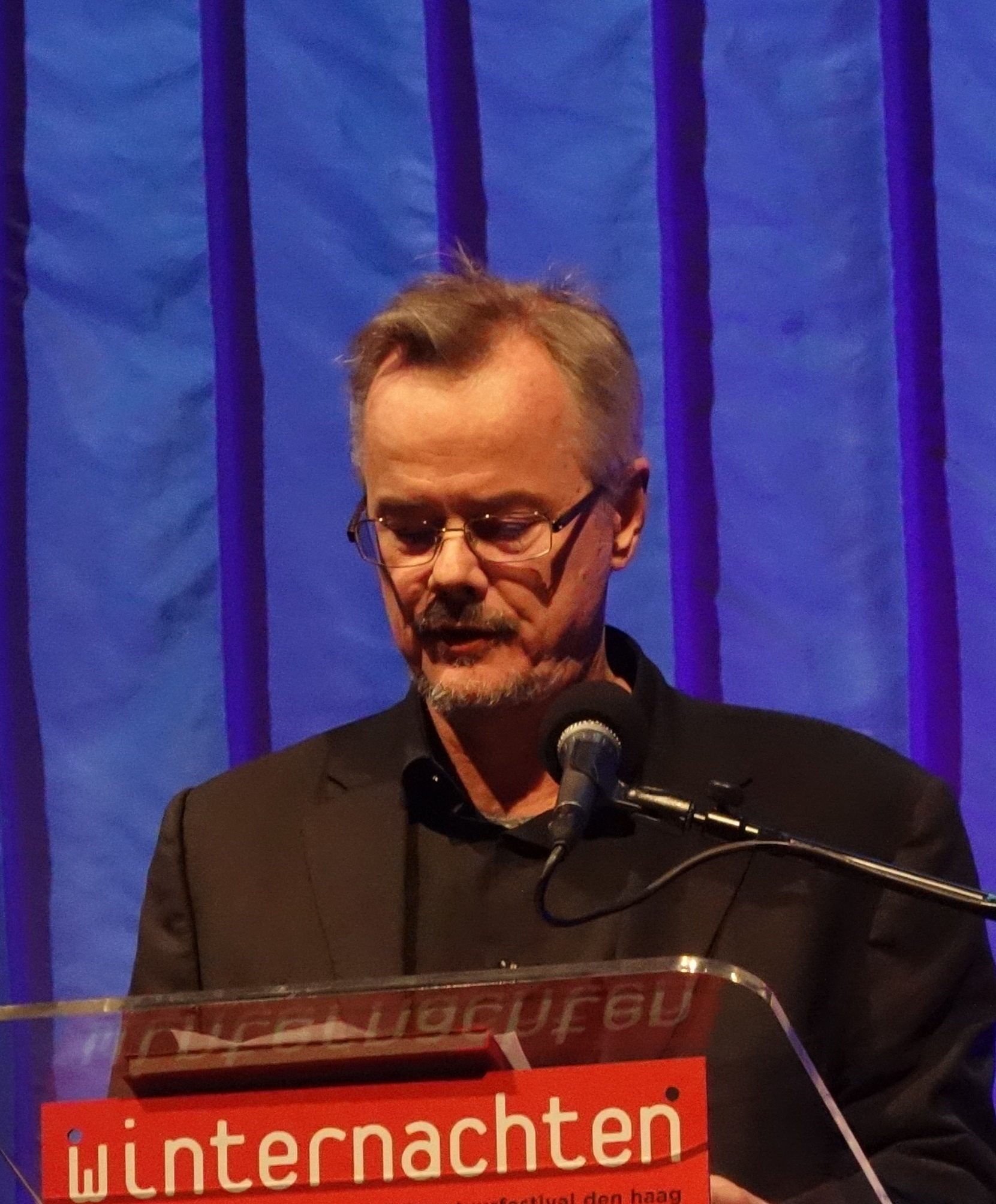
- Van Aken in 2019
- Born: 9 August 1961 (age 65); Herwen en Aerdt, The Netherlands
- Occupations: Docent, writer
- Notable work: De valse dageraad (2001), Koning voor een dag (2008)

Jan van Aken (Herwen en Aerdt, 9 August 1961) is a Dutch writer, who worked in the cultural sector and in automation. He taught at the Schrijversvakschool in Amsterdam from 2003 to 2018.

He has written the following historical novels:

- Het oog van de basilisk (2000)
- De valse dageraad (2001)
- De dwaas van Palmyra (2003)
- Het fluwelen labyrint (2005)
- Koning voor een dag (2008)
- De afvallige (2013)
- De ommegang (2018)
- Het xoanon (2024)
- Monsterzicht (2026)

This writer's first three books take place before the Early Modern Period. Het oog van de basilisk's protagonist is Epiphanius Rusticus in the aftermath of the Roman Empire, while De valse dageraar is about Hroswith van Wikala in the Middle Ages, during the first millennium. The third novel De dwaas van Palmyra takes place in the 1st Century and describes the travels of the philosopher Apollonius of Tyana to India, as later seen through the eyes of his student, Damis.

Het fluwelen labyrint takes place in Amsterdam during the 1980s. In Koning voor een dag, the protagonist is the historic poet Hipponax, who lived in Ionia during the 6th Century. Hipponax was known for his sharp tongue and his coarse language. For this book, Van Aken used both original fragments from Hipponax as well as fictional Hipponax poems he created himself.

Jan van Aken's most recent novel is De Afvallige. It takes place during the time of Julian the Apostate, seen through the eyes of a group of boys belonging to a Christian Sect who ended up being involved in an assassination plot. This large-scale novel covers the period between 350 and 392 C.E..

Van Aken was previously published in the magazines Optima and Nieuw Wereldtijdschrift. His second novel was nominated for the Seghers Literatuurprijs. De afvallige came on the longlist for both the AKO and Libris literature prizes.
