= Lobith =

- Village
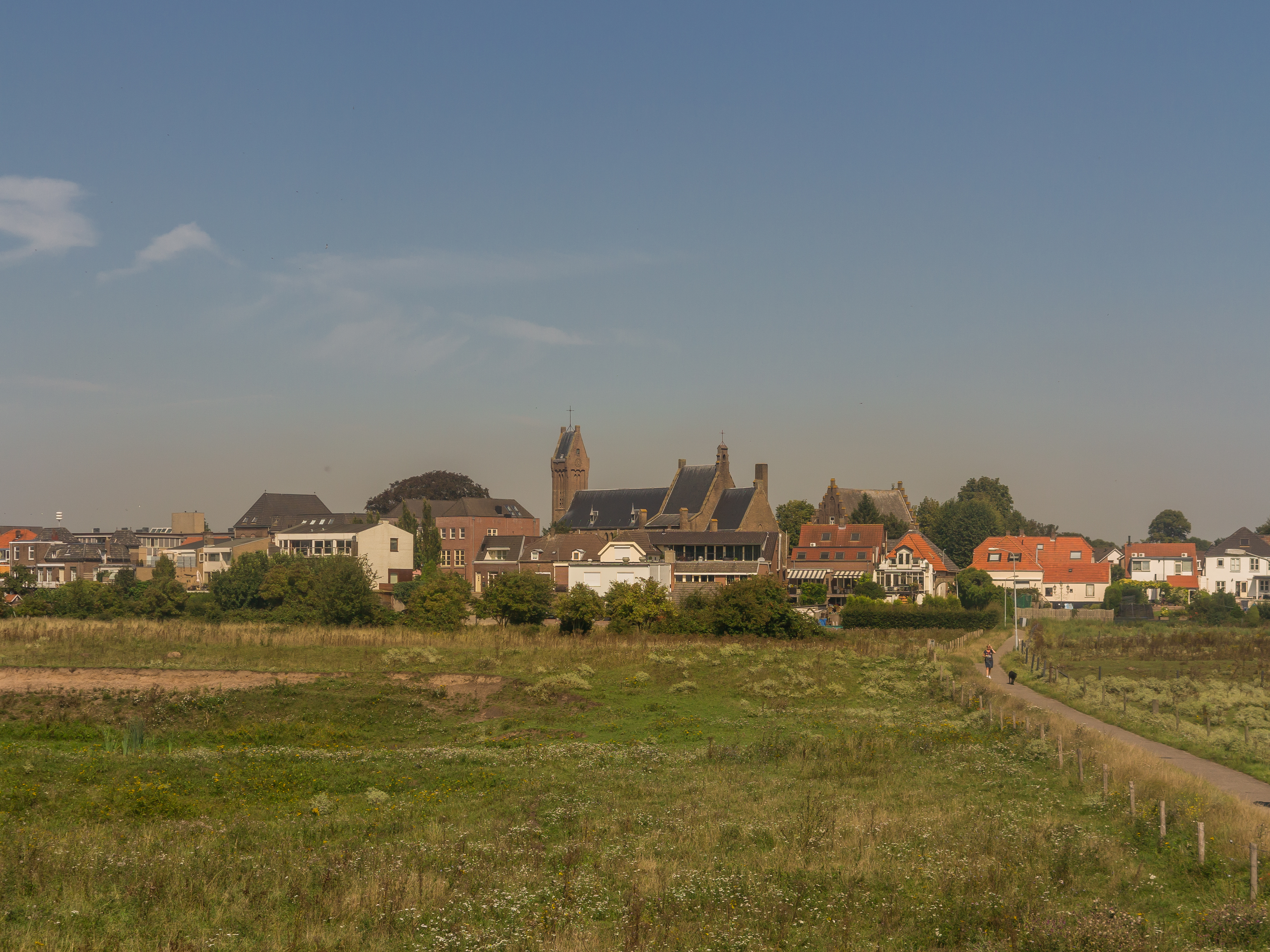
- View of the village

- Location in the province of Gelderland Lobith (Netherlands)
- Coordinates: 51°51′42″N 6°7′5″E
- Country: Netherlands
- Province: Gelderland
- Municipality: Zevenaar

Area
  - Total: 0.83 km^{2} (0.32 sq mi)
- Elevation: 15 m (49 ft)

Population (2021)
  - Total: 3,055
  - Density: 3,700/km^{2} (9,500/sq mi)
- Time zone: UTC+1 (CET)
  - Summer (DST): UTC+2 (CEST)
- Postal code: 6915
- Dialing code: 0316

Lobith is a village in the Dutch province of Gelderland. It is located in the municipality of Zevenaar. Traditionally, it is said that the Rhine enters the Netherlands at Lobith, although in reality, this happens about 4 km further upstream, near Spijk.

Lobith was a separate municipality for a short while between 1 March 1817 and 1 January 1818, when it became a part of Herwen en Aerdt.

== History ==
In 885, the Danish chief Godfrid was summoned to Lobith for a meeting after being accused of complicity with Hugh, Duke of Alsace in an insurrection against the emperor Charles the Fat. In an act of treachery he was killed by a group of German nobles.

The village was first mentioned in 1222 as Lobedhe. The etymology is unclear. The village developed along a bend in the Rhine. In 1307, a castle was built in Lobith. In 1473, it became part of the Duchy of Cleves. In 1609, the Duke of Cleves died without a successor, and the War of the Jülich Succession started which resulted in Lobith becoming a part of the Kingdom of Prussia. The Dutch Reformed Church was built in 1660 as a replacement of a chapel which was destroyed in 1648. In 1672, the castle was destroyed by the French.

Up to 1711, the Rhine was located close to the village, however the river changed course. The distance from the river resulted in Tolkamer becoming the centre of economic activity for the region. In 1816, Lobith became part of the Netherlands. In 1840, it was home to 682 people. The grist mill Tolhuys Coornmolen was built in 1888. In 1930, it burned down and only the base remained. The grinding was since then performed by an electric motor. In 1995, the wind mill was restored and operates once a week.

== Gallery ==
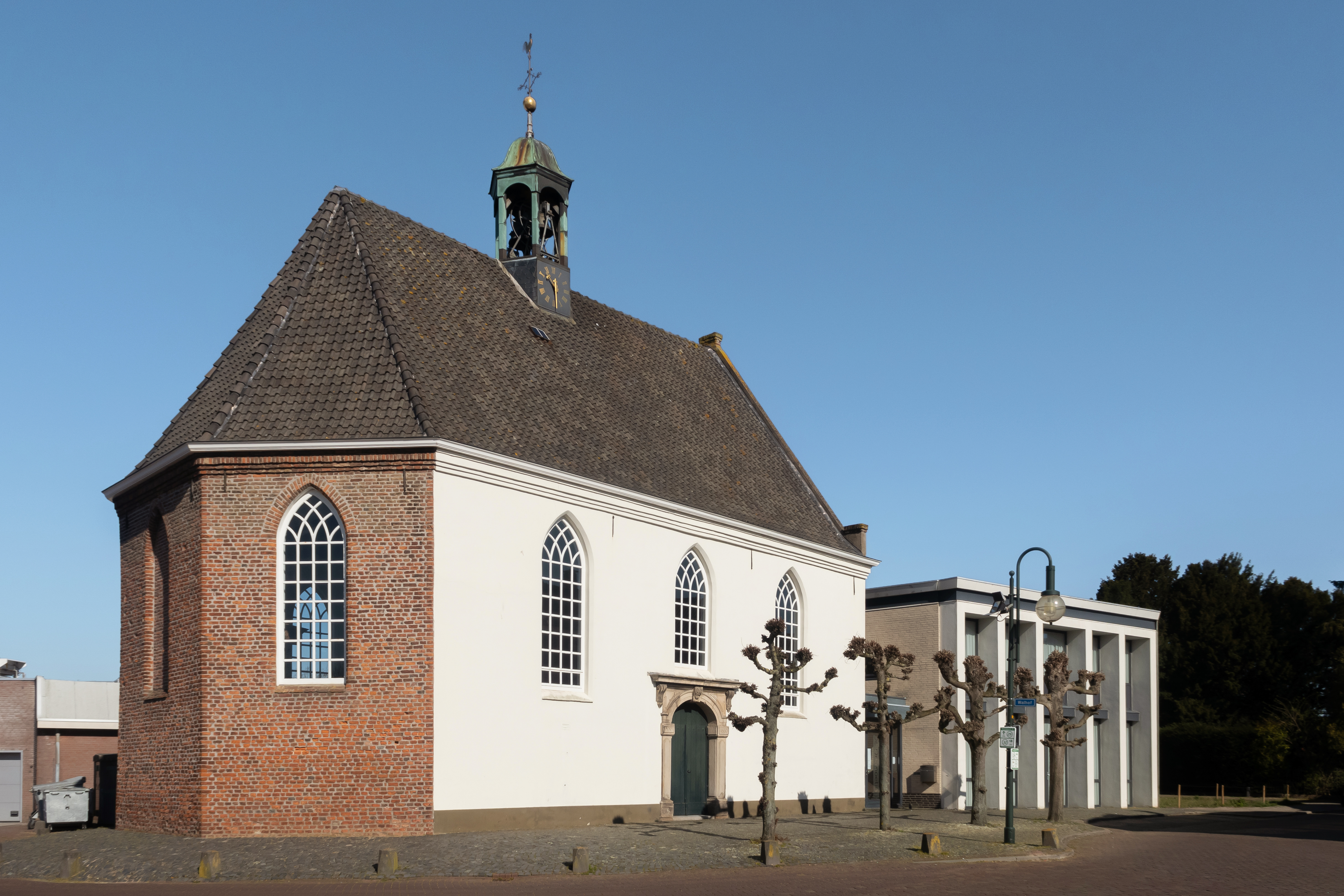
Reformed church

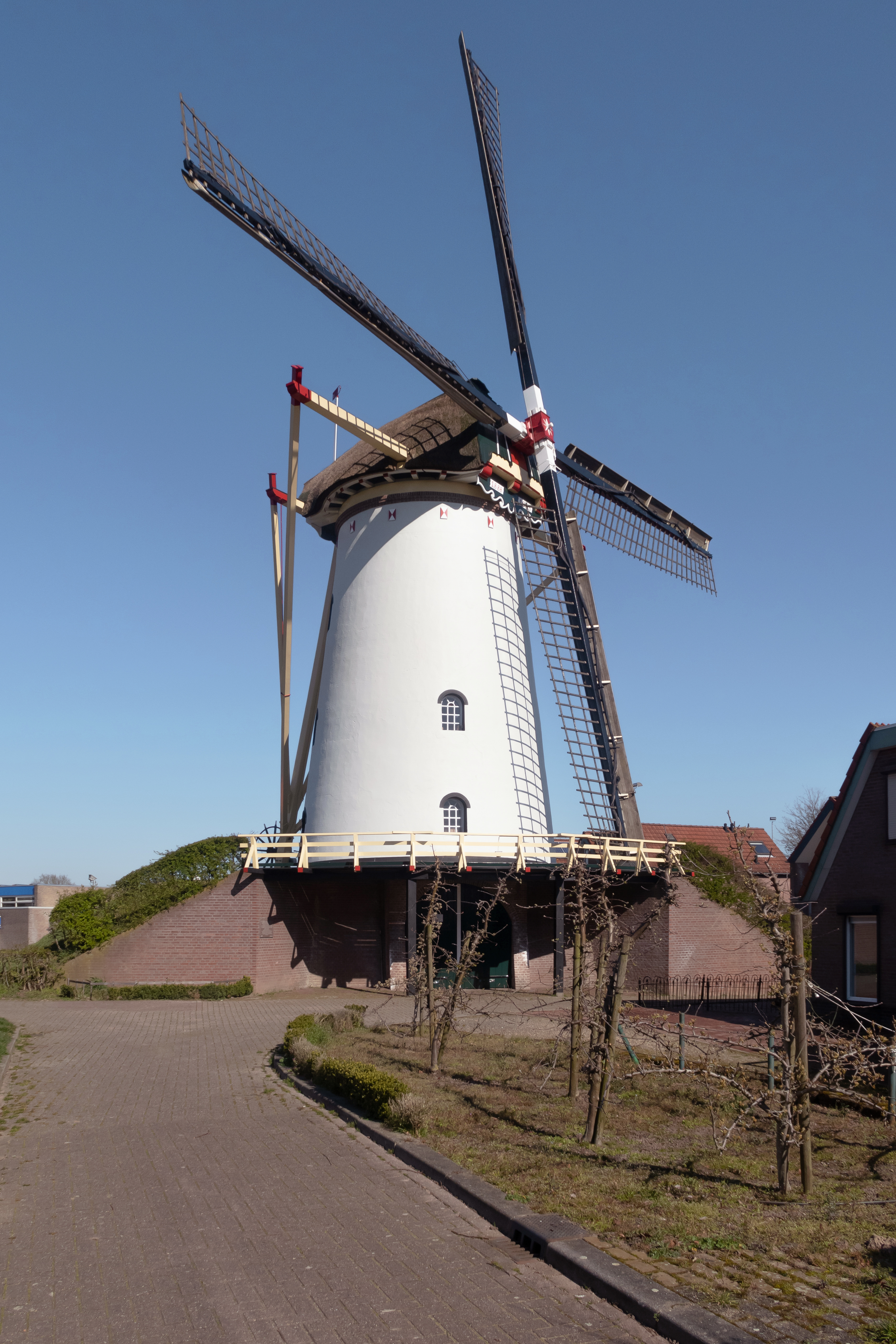
Windmill: Tolhuys Coornmolen

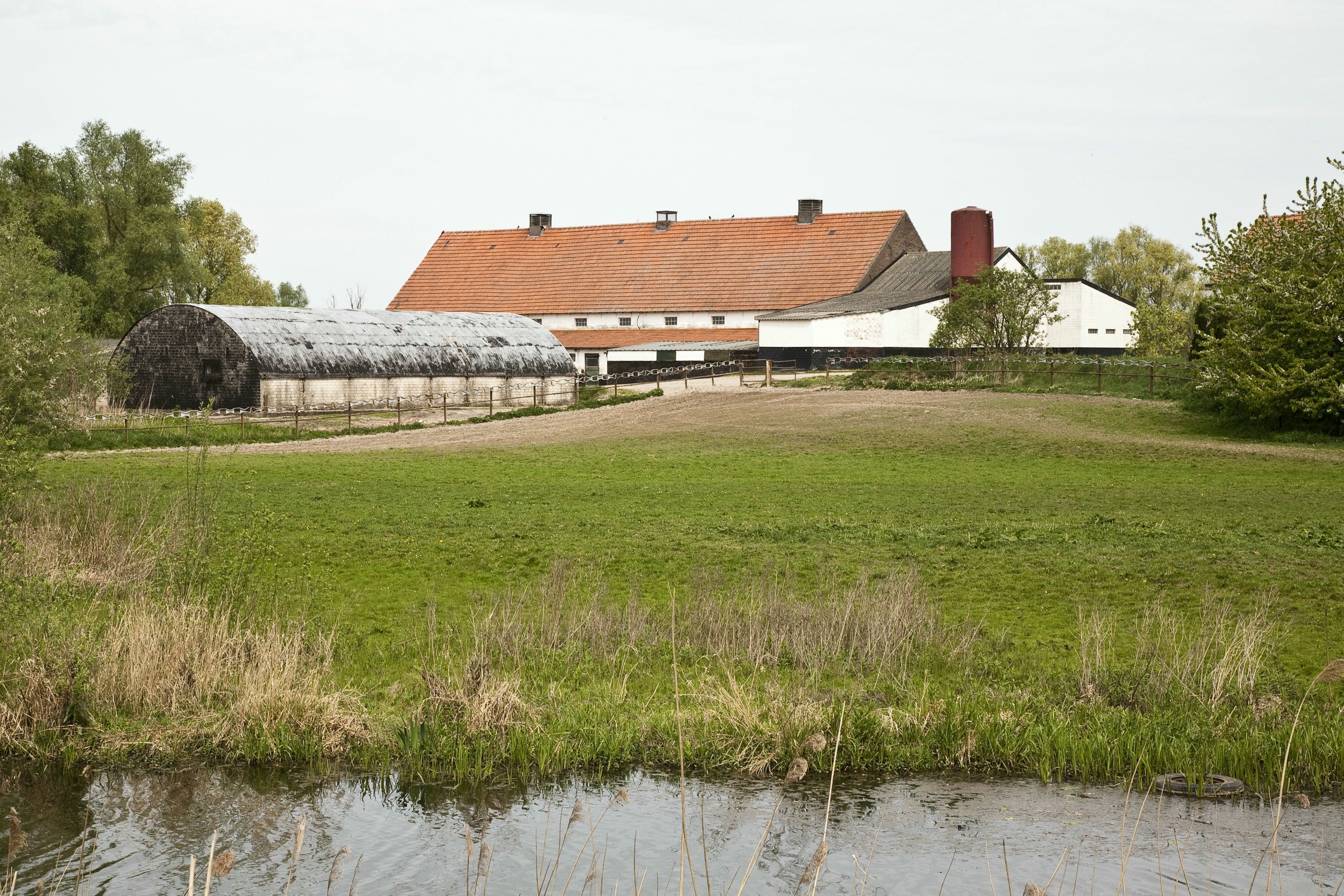
Farm on an artificial mound

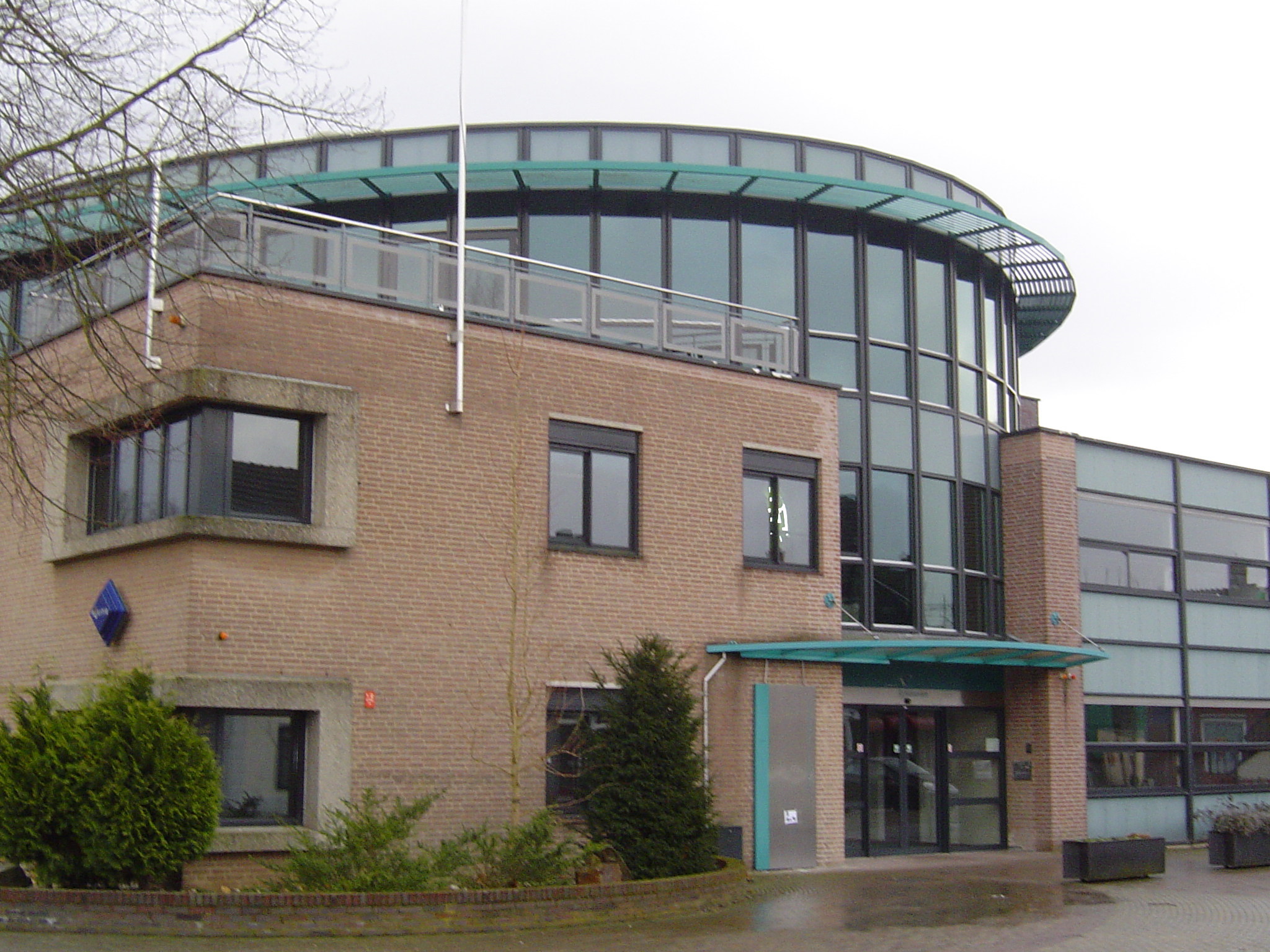
Former town hall
