= Aerdt =

- Village
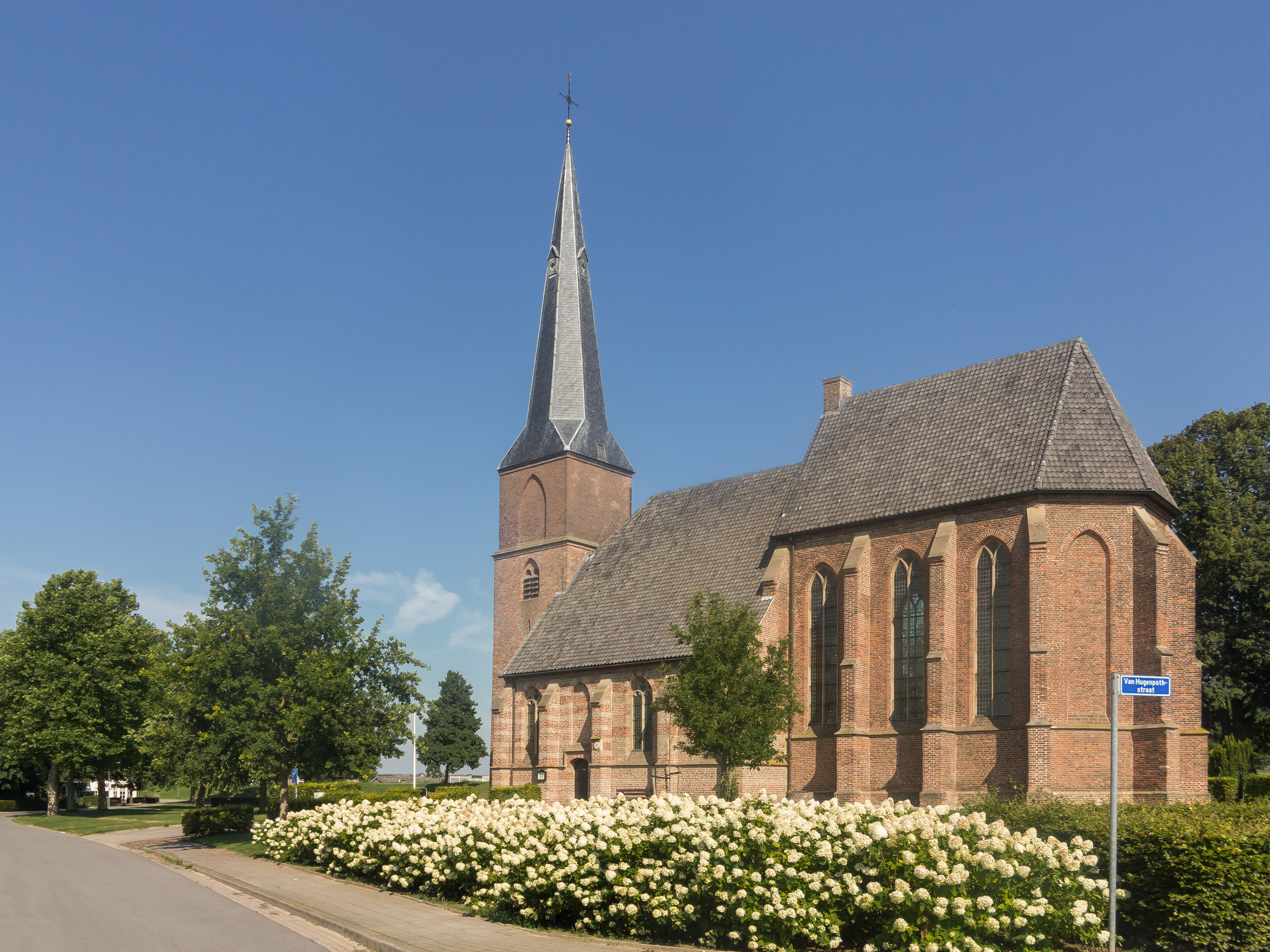
- Church of Aerdt

- Location in the Netherlands Aerdt (Netherlands)
- Coordinates: 51°53′36″N 6°5′1″E
- Country: Netherlands
- Province: Gelderland
- Municipality: Zevenaar

Area
  - Total: 4.48 km^{2} (1.73 sq mi)
- Elevation: 13 m (43 ft)

Population (2021)
  - Total: 820
  - Density: 180/km^{2} (470/sq mi)
- Time zone: UTC+1 (CET)
  - Summer (DST): UTC+2 (CEST)
- Postal code: 6913
- Dialing code: 0316

Aerdt is a village in the Dutch province of Gelderland. It is in the municipality of Zevenaar, about 20 km northeast of the city of Nijmegen, close to the German border.

Until it became part of Rijnwaarden in 1985, Aerdt and neighbouring village Herwen constituted a separate municipality Herwen en Aerdt. In 2018 Aerdt became part of the municipality of Zevenaar.

== History ==
The village was first mentioned in between 1294 and 1295 as Arde, and means earth / plowed field. Aerdt developed as a dike village along the Oude Rijn. The tower of the Dutch Reformed Church was built between the 12th and 14th century and was enlarged in 1875. The church was restored between 1985 and 1989. In 1840, it was home to 525 people.

== Gallery ==
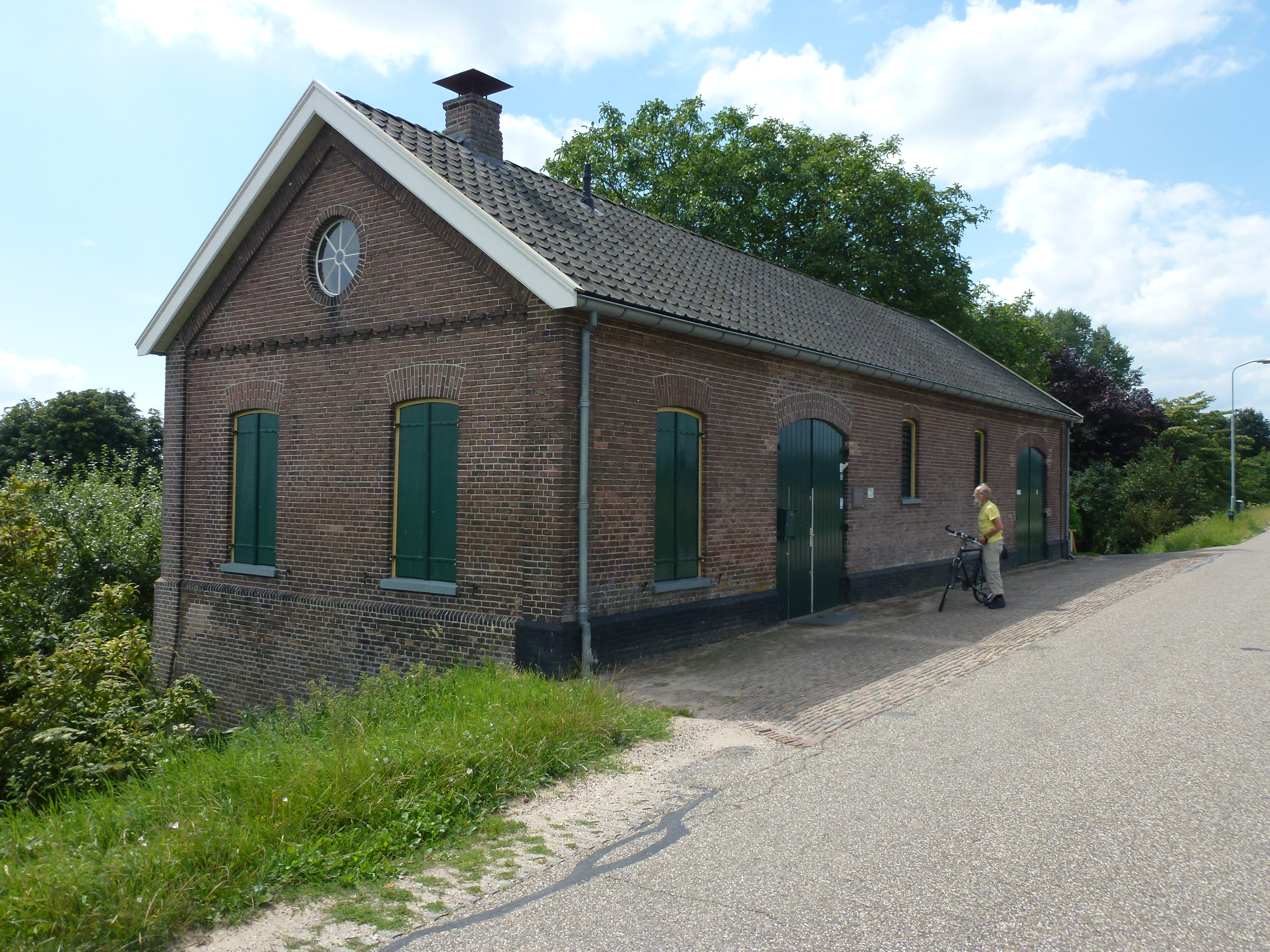
Dike shed

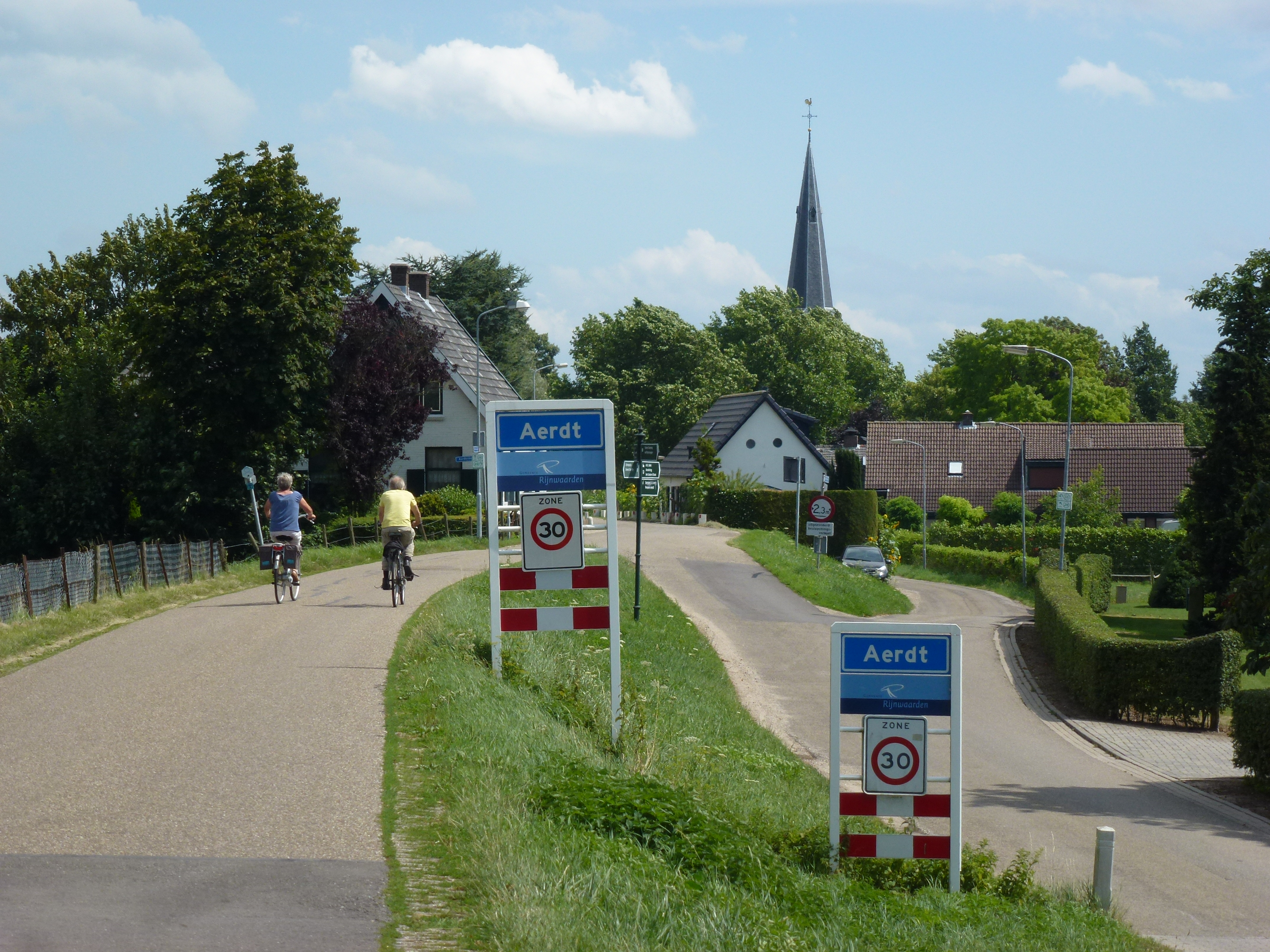
Welcome to Aerdt

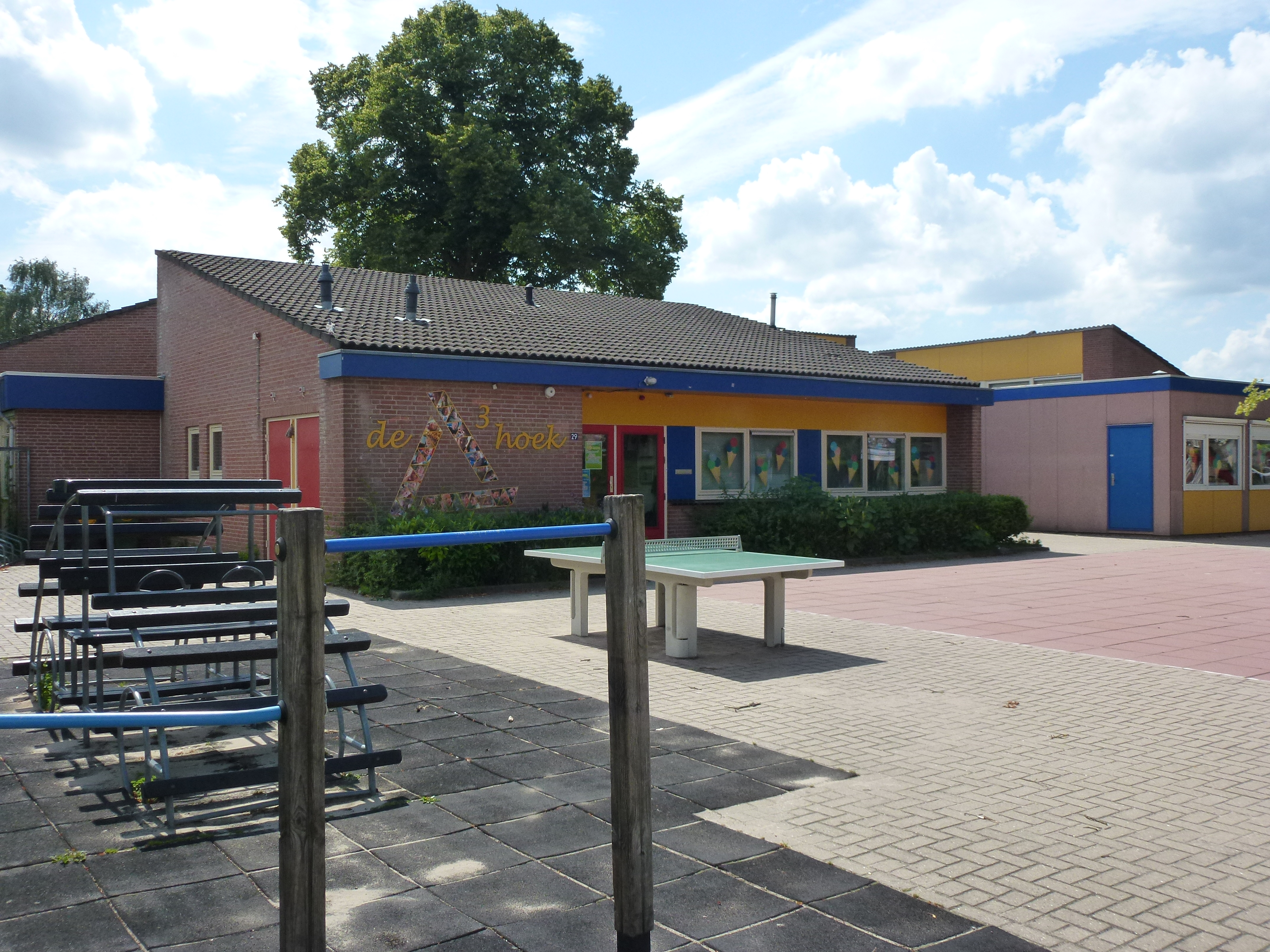
School in Aerdt

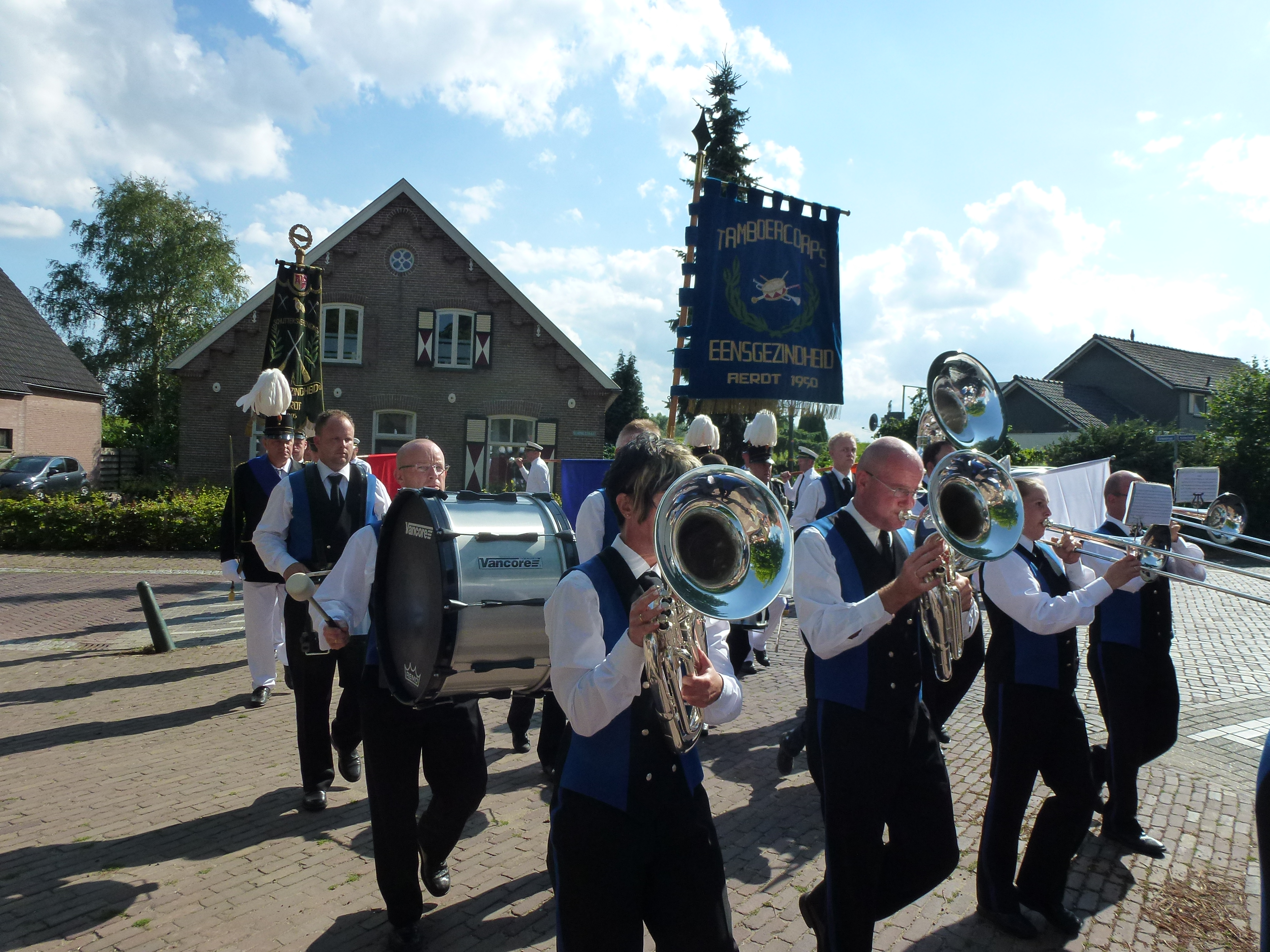
Drumming band
