= Pannerden =

- Village
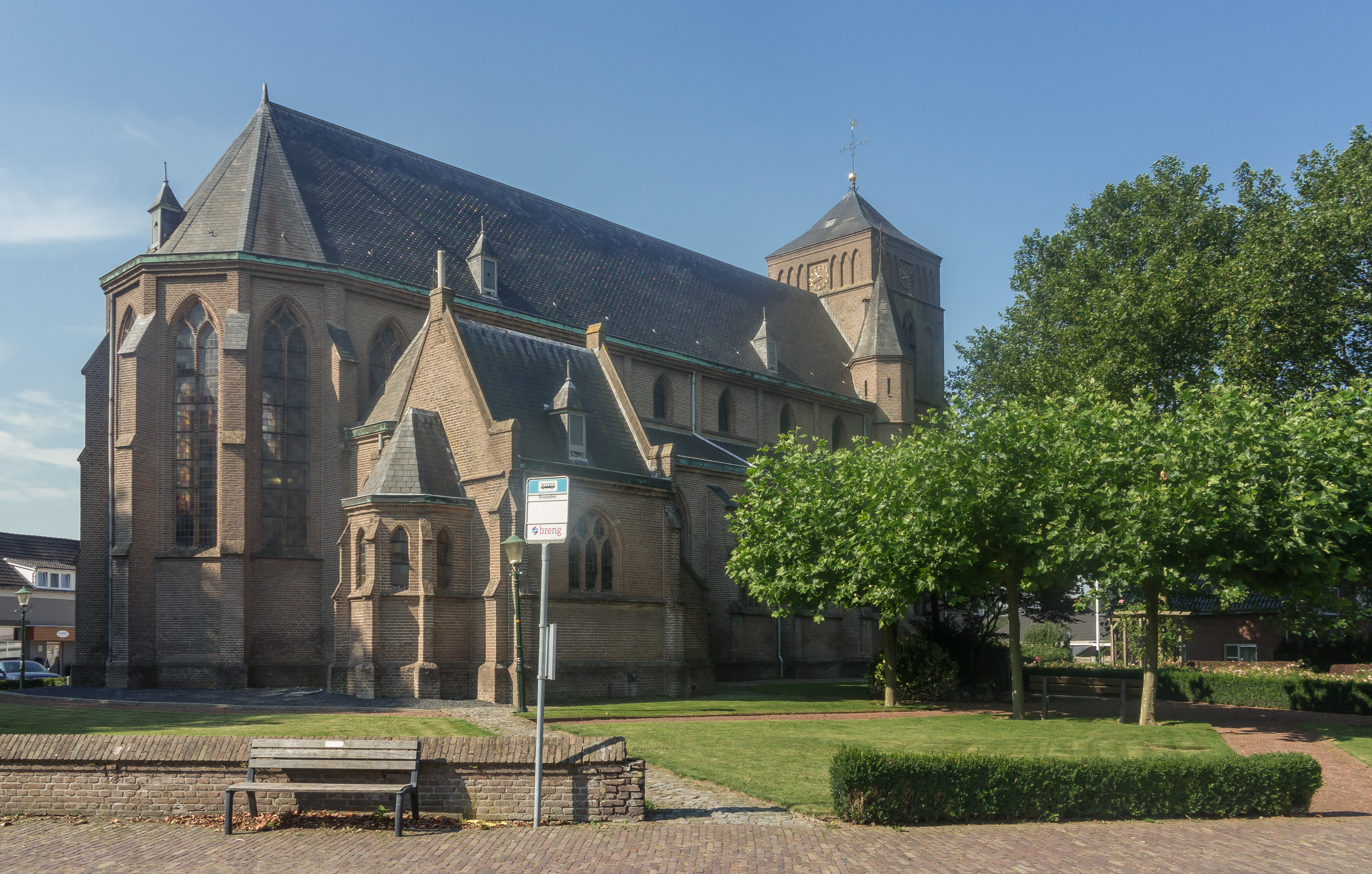
- Pannerden, church: Martinuskerk

- Coat of arms

- Location in the Netherlands Pannerden (Netherlands)
- Coordinates: 51°53′24″N 6°2′16″E
- Country: Netherlands
- Province: Gelderland
- Municipality: Zevenaar

Area
  - Total: 6.55 km^{2} (2.53 sq mi)
- Elevation: 13 m (43 ft)

Population (2021)
  - Total: 2,360
  - Density: 360/km^{2} (933/sq mi)
- Time zone: UTC+1 (CET)
  - Summer (DST): UTC+2 (CEST)
- Postal code: 6911
- Dialing code: 0316

Pannerden is a village in the Dutch province of Gelderland. It is located in the municipality of Zevenaar.

Pannerden was a separate municipality from 1818 to 1985, when it became a part of the new municipality of Rijnwaarden.

== History ==
The village was first mentioned between 1052 and 1056 as Pannardum. The etymology is unclear. The village developed along the Rhine. In 1284, it became part of the Duchy of Cleves. Between 1705 and 1707, the Pannerdens Kanaal to control the water flow between the Rhine and the Waal.

In 1817, Pannerden became part of the Netherlands. In 1840, it was home to 507 people. In 1860, the postal authorities split the village in Pannerden (Oostzijde) and Pannerden (Westzijde) because it was cut in two by the canal. Since around 1970, it is once again a single village. The Catholic St.-Martinus Church was built between 1877 and 1878. The tower was destroyed in 1944 and not rebuilt.

== Gallery ==
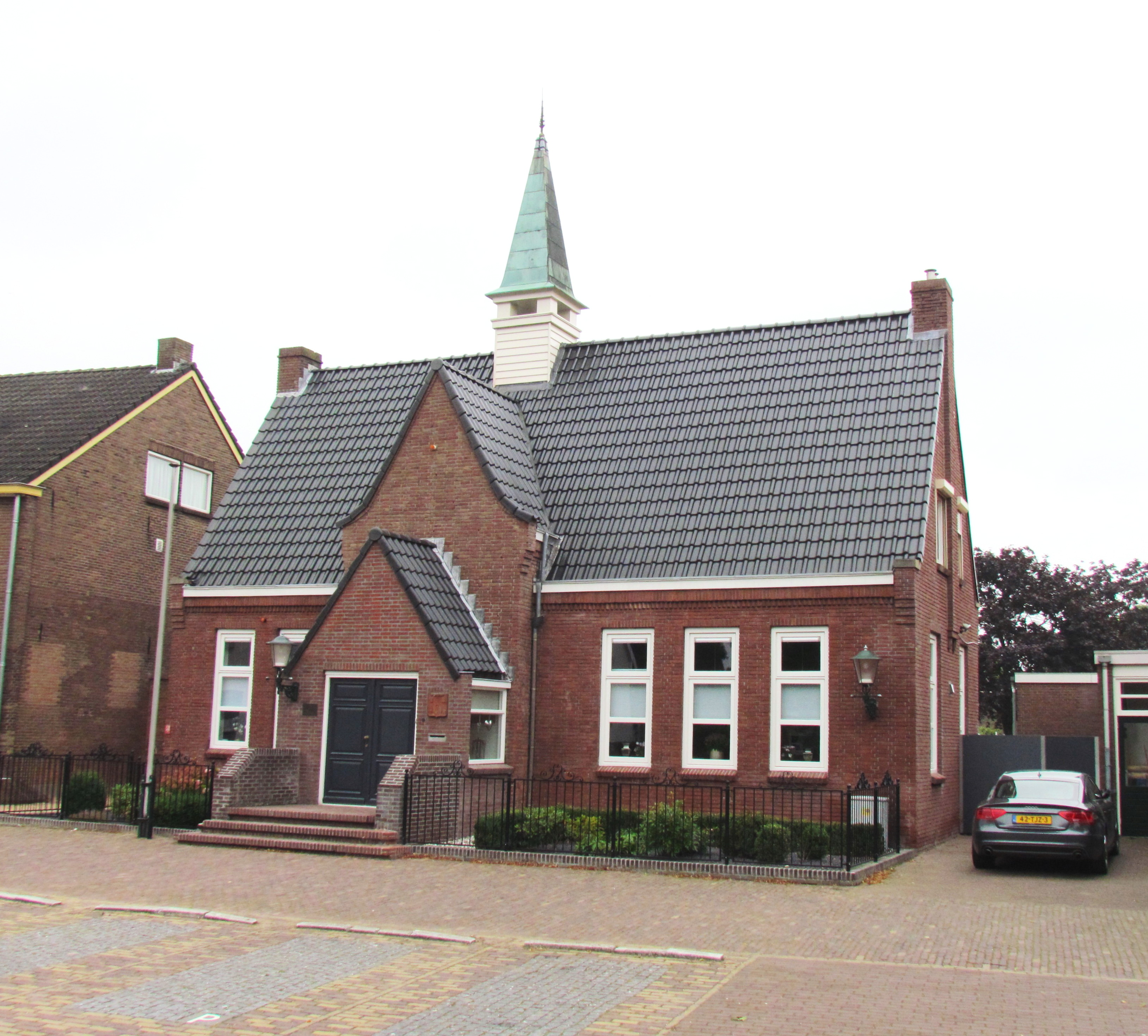
Former town hall

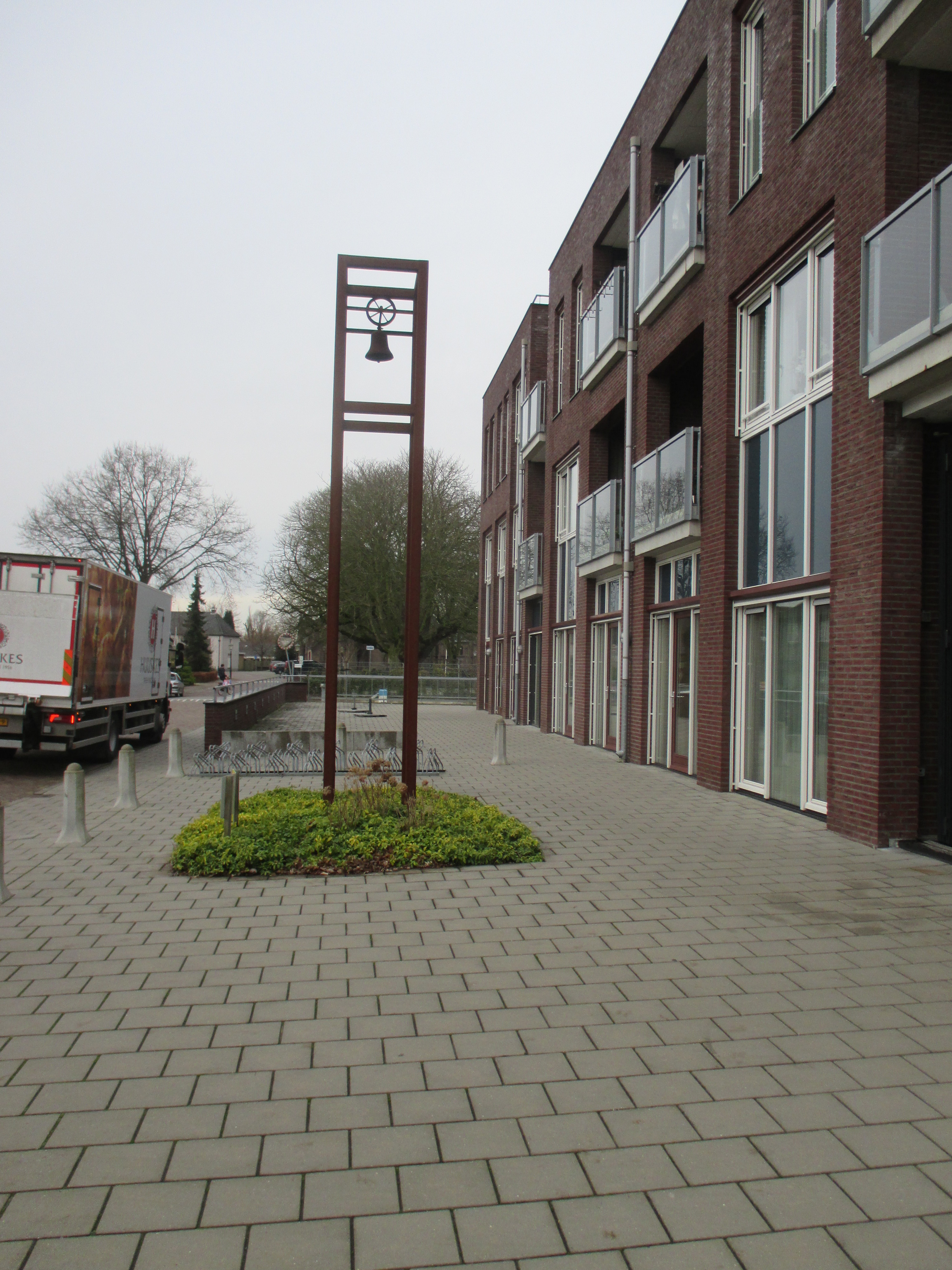
Belfry

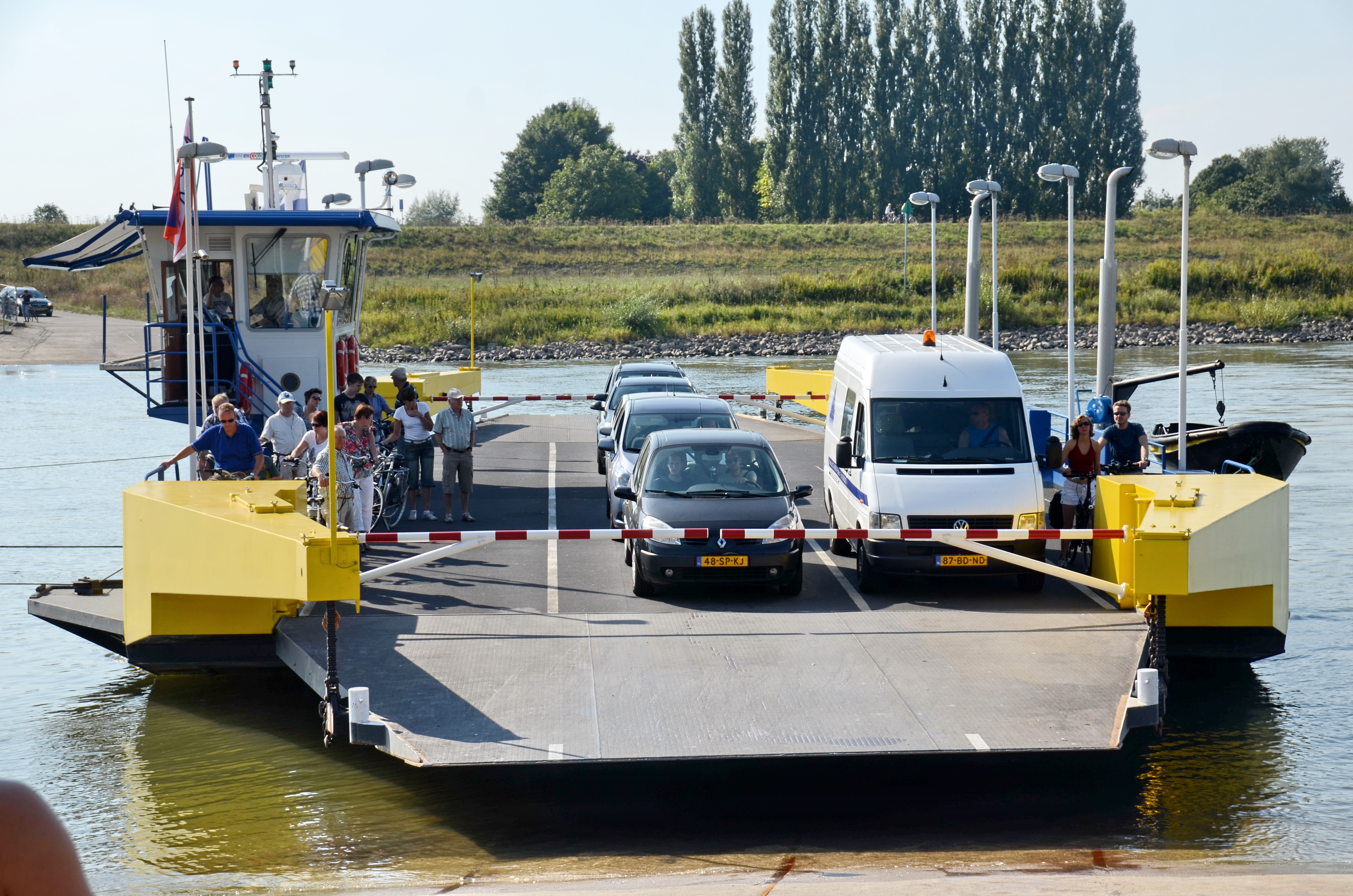
Ferry between Pannerden and Doornenburg

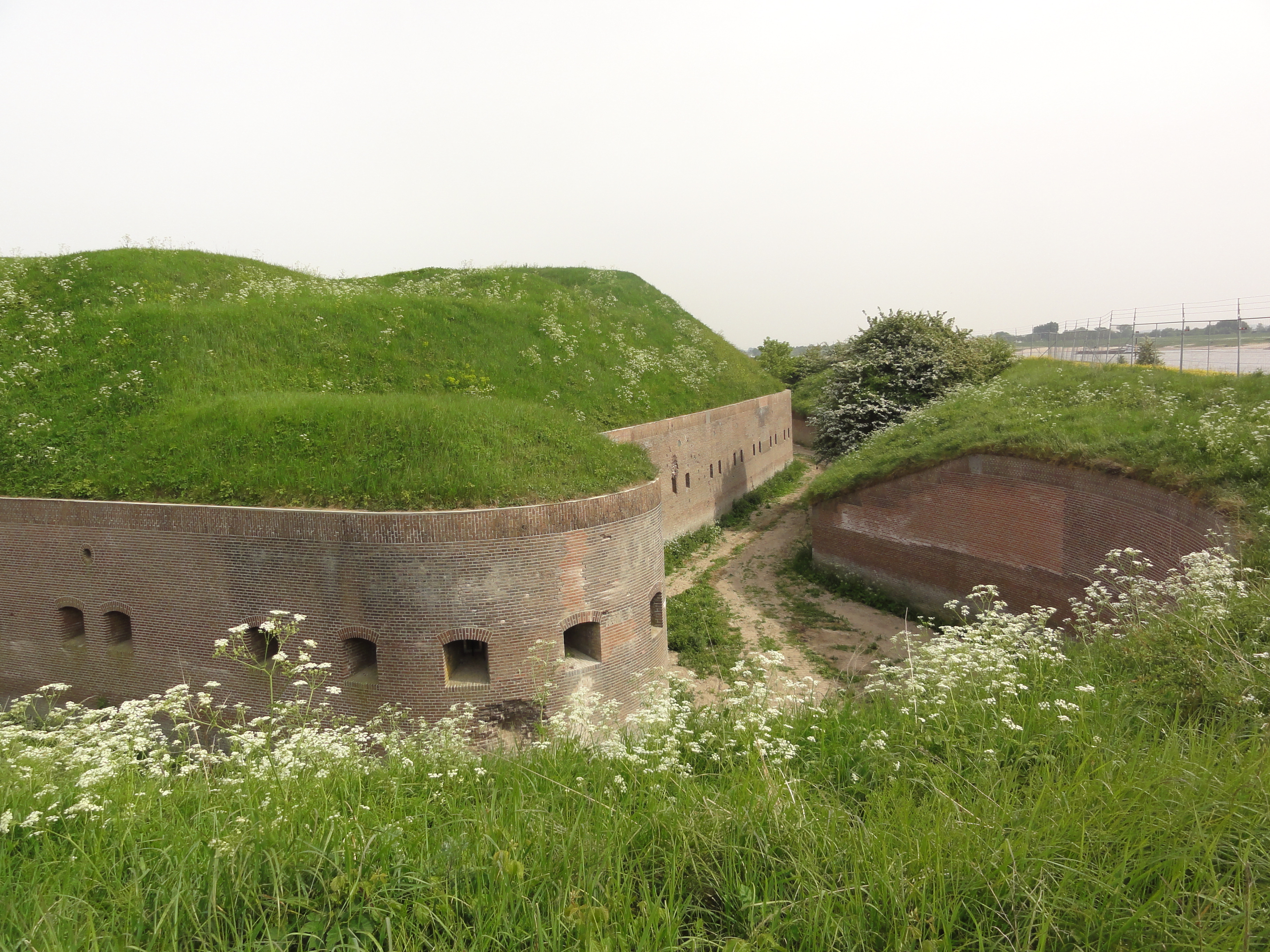
Fort Pannerden
