= Herwen =

Place in Gelderland, Netherlands

- Village
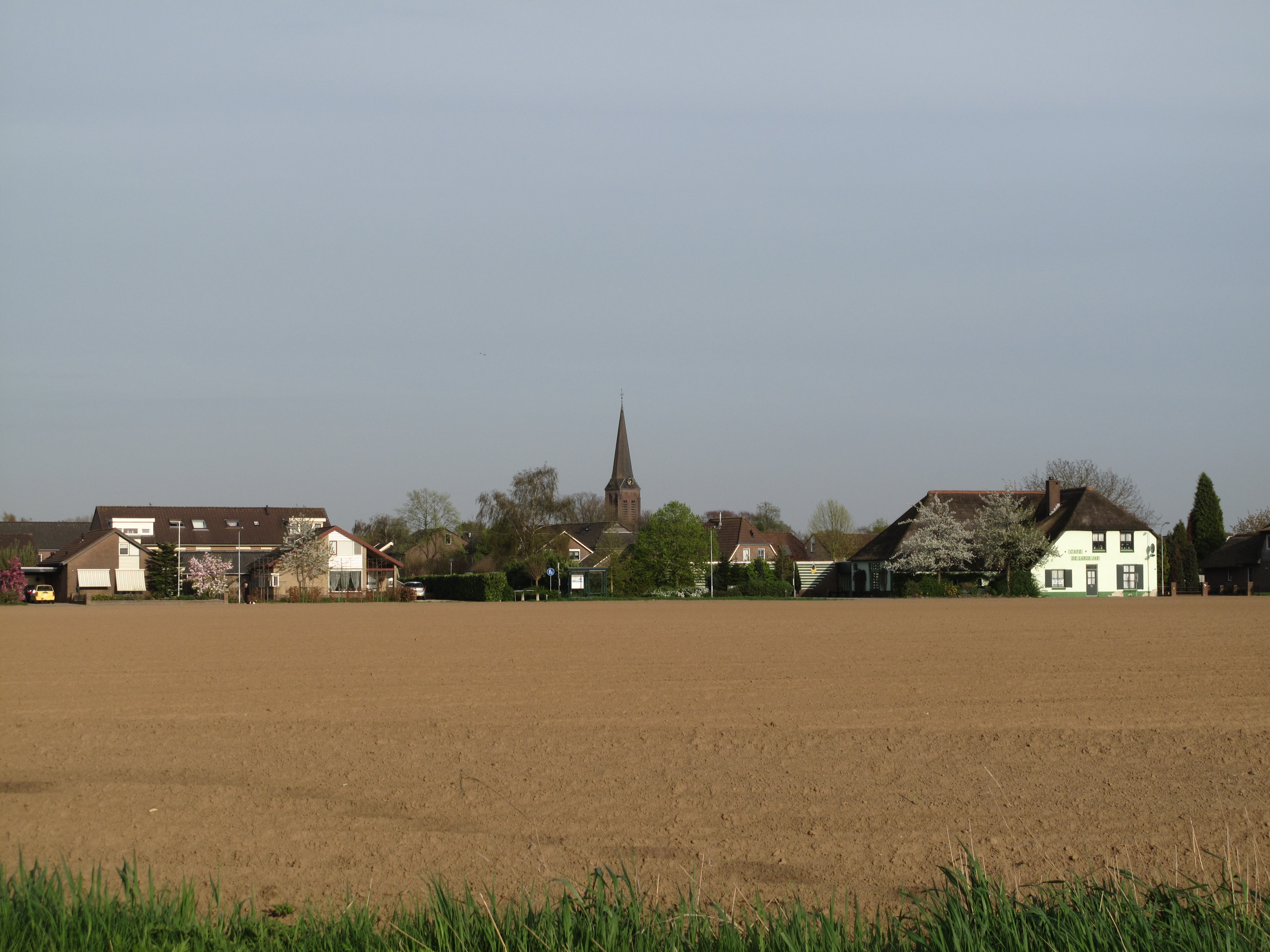
- View on the village

- Location in the Netherlands Herwen (Netherlands)
- Coordinates: 51°53′8″N 6°5′58″E
- Country: Netherlands
- Province: Gelderland
- Municipality: Zevenaar

Area
  - Total: 5.55 km^{2} (2.14 sq mi)
- Elevation: 13 m (43 ft)

Population (2021)
  - Total: 1,060
  - Density: 191/km^{2} (495/sq mi)
- Time zone: UTC+1 (CET)
  - Summer (DST): UTC+2 (CEST)
- Postal code: 6914
- Dialing code: 0316

Herwen is a village in the Dutch province of Gelderland. It is located in the municipality of Zevenaar.

Herwen was a separate municipality until 1818, when the area was divided between the new municipality of Herwen en Aerdt and Pannerden.

== History ==
The village was first mentioned in the 1st century as Carvio ad Molem. The etymologie in unclear. It was discovered on the tomb of Marcus Mallius, a Roman soldier buried in Herwen. In 897, it was attested as Harauua. Herwen developed along the Oude Rijn near Castle Ter Cluse. The castle was built in 1348 and destroyed in 1598. In 1652, a havezate was built in its place. The Catholic St.-Martinus Church was built between 1904 and 1905 as a replacement of an 1818 predecessor. In 1840, Herwen was home to 654 people.

== Gallery ==
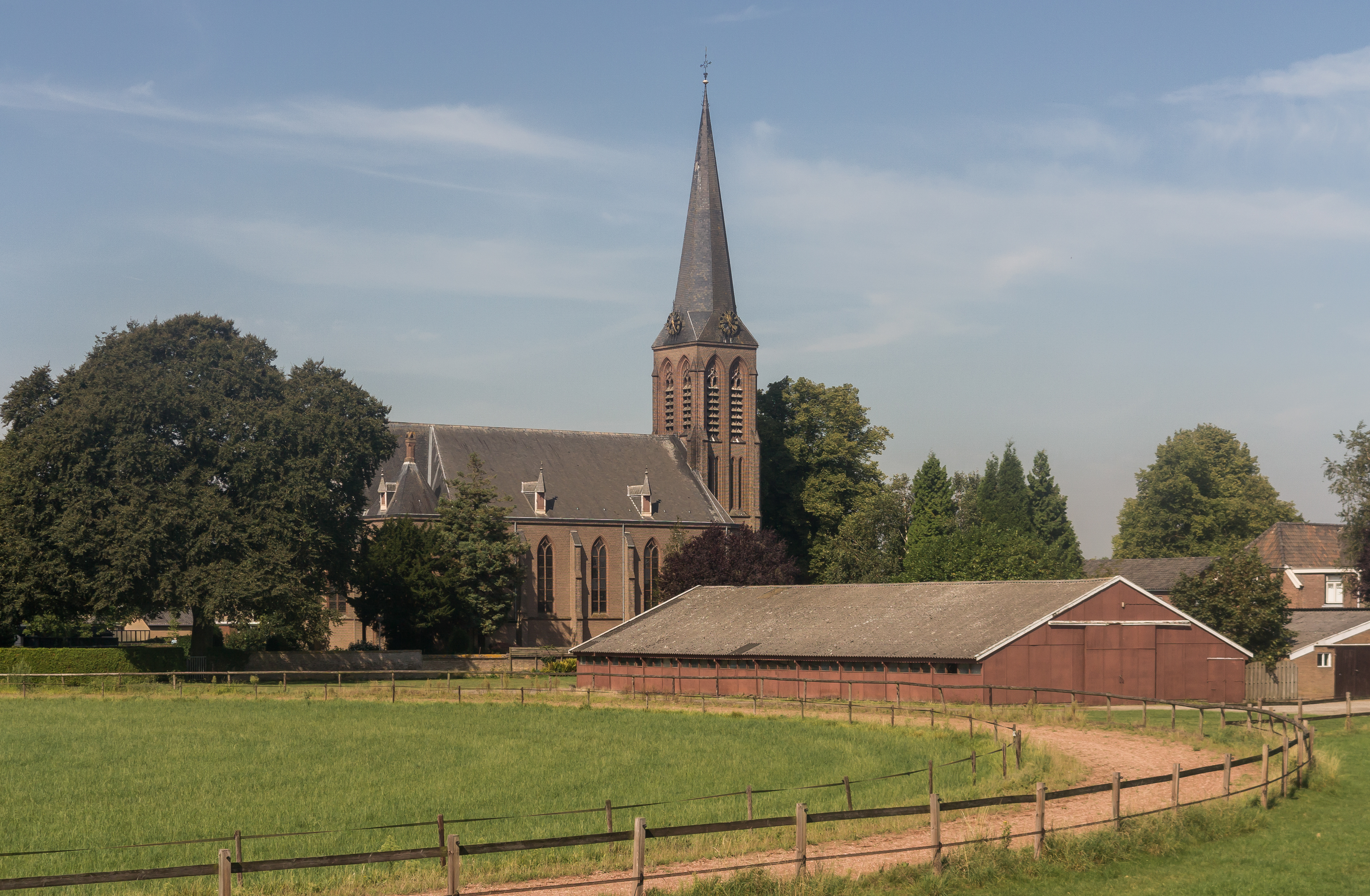
Herwen, church: de Sint Martinuskerk

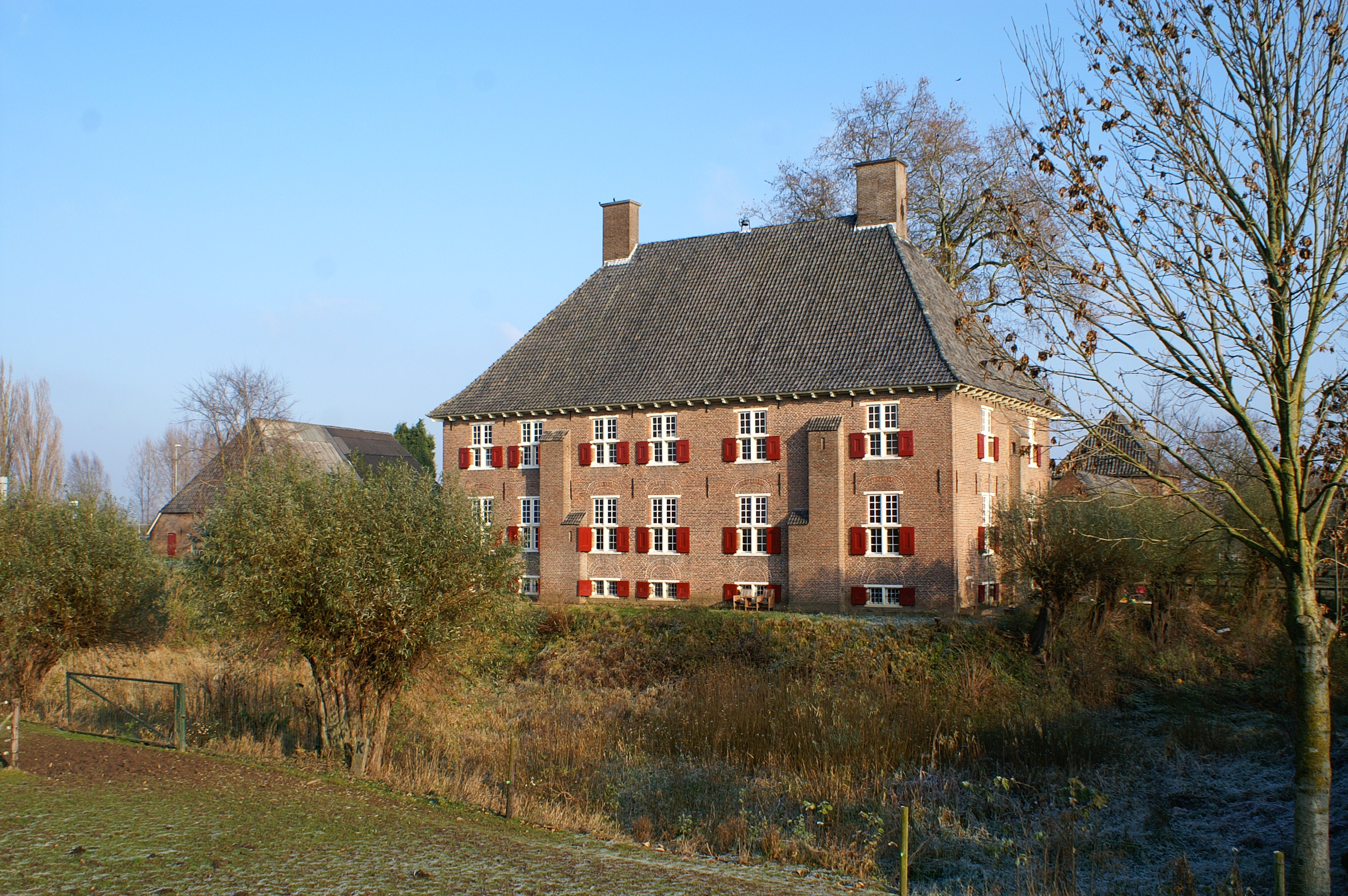
't Huis Aerdt

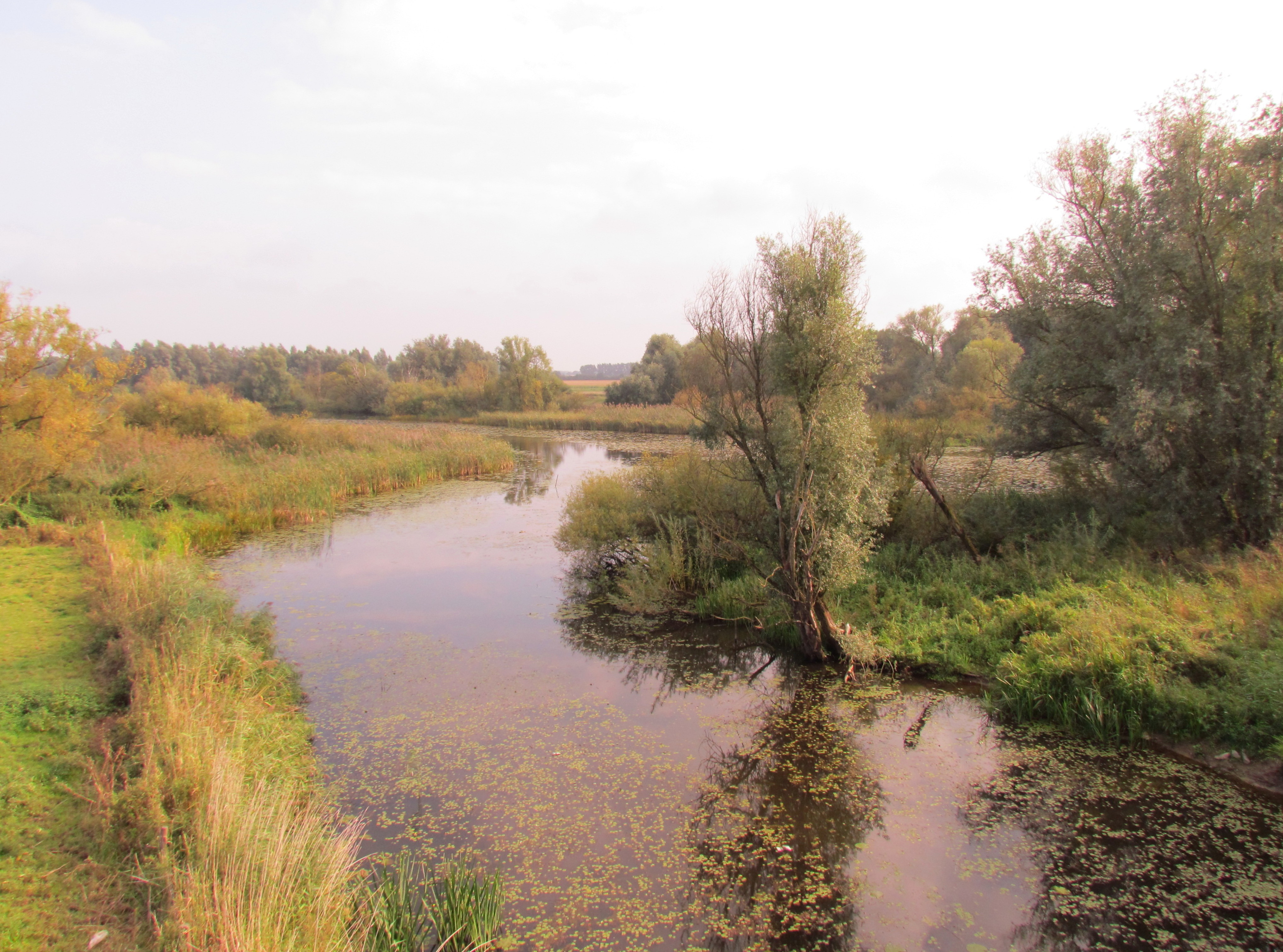
Oude Rijm near Herwen
