= Tolkamer =

- Village
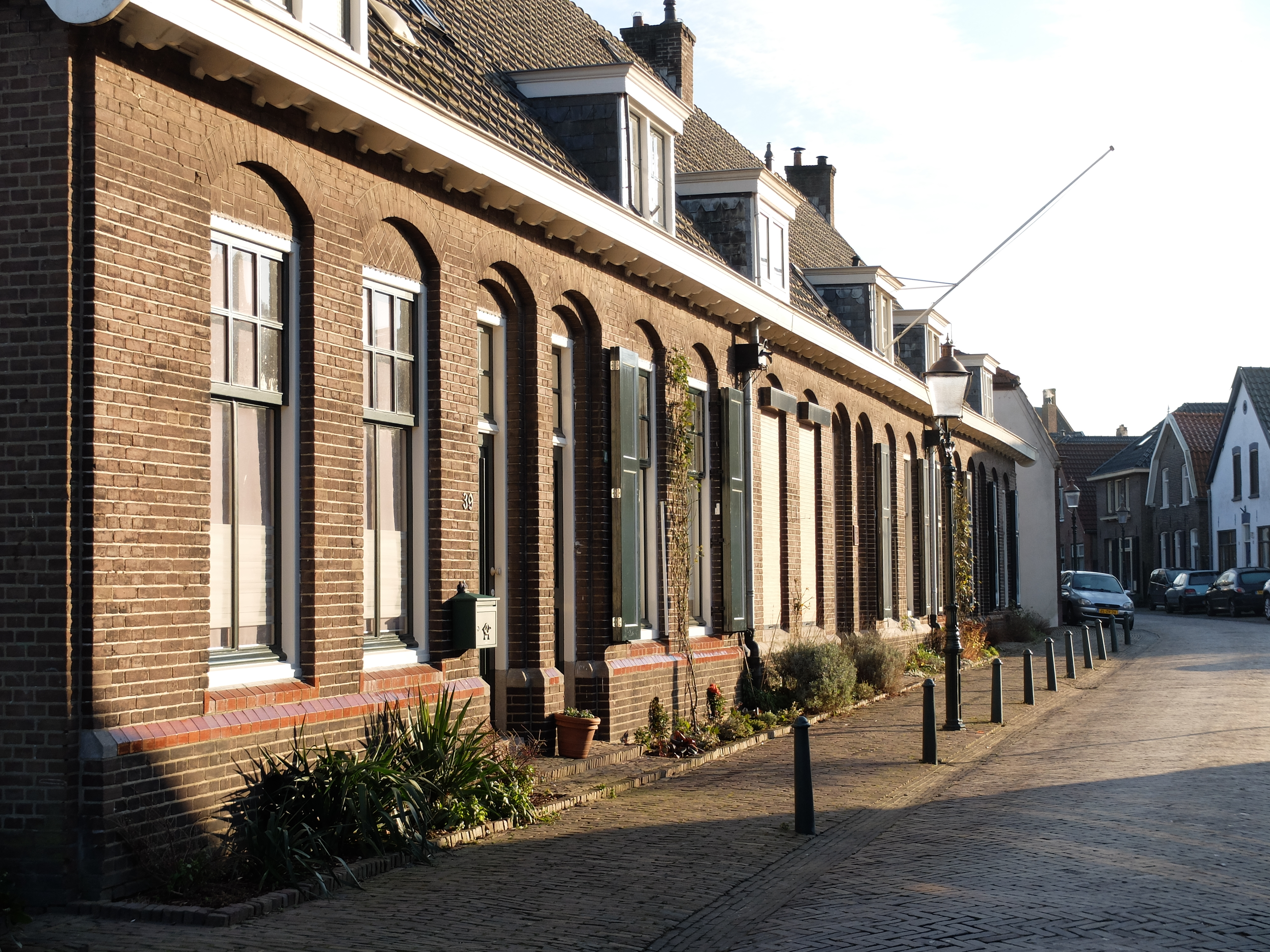
- Village street

- Location in the Netherlands Tolkamer (Netherlands)
- Coordinates: 51.8527°N 6.1027°E
- Country: Netherlands
- Province: Gelderland
- Municipality: Zevenaar

Area
  - Total: 1.19 km^{2} (0.46 sq mi)
- Elevation: 16 m (52 ft)

Population (2021)
  - Total: 2,745
  - Density: 2,310/km^{2} (5,970/sq mi)
- Time zone: UTC+1 (CET)
  - Summer (DST): UTC+2 (CEST)
- Postal code: 6916
- Dialing code: 0316

Tolkamer is a village near Lobith in the municipality of Zevenaar in the province of Gelderland, the Netherlands. The village is on the border with Germany.

The village was first mentioned in 1773 as Tol, and means "toll room". Otto I, Count of Guelders established a toll for traffic on the Rhine in 1224 which remained at Tolkamer until 1868. The village developed along the river bank. Around 1590, the Rhine and Waal diverged near Tolkamer which increased the importance of the village. Later, the village became a centre for brickworks.

In 1920, a ship wharf was established, and a harbour was built in 1930. Tolkamer and Lobith have grown into a single urban area and are often referred to as Lobith-Tolkamer, however they remain separate villages.

== Gallery ==
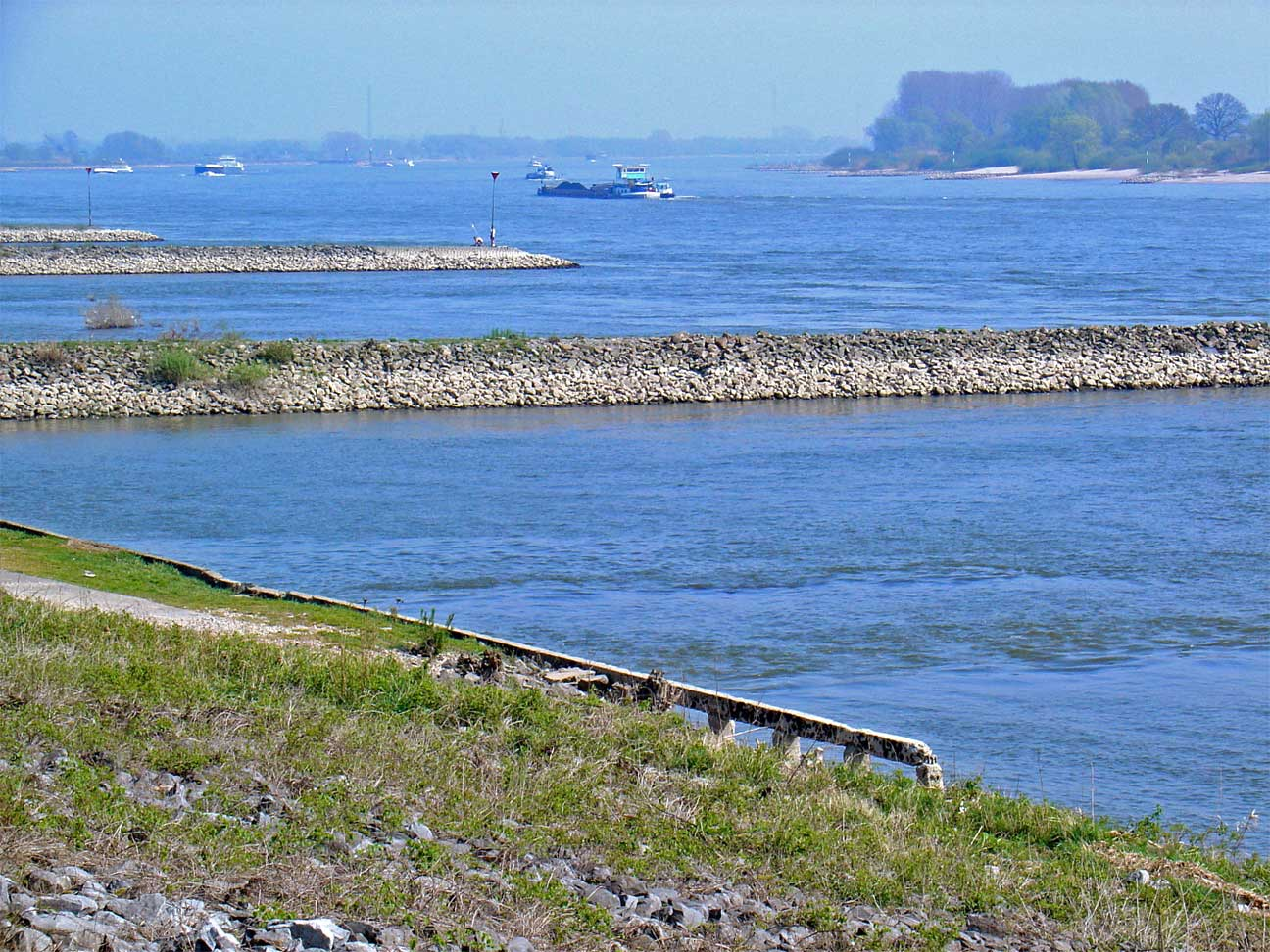
Rhine with groynes near Tolkamer

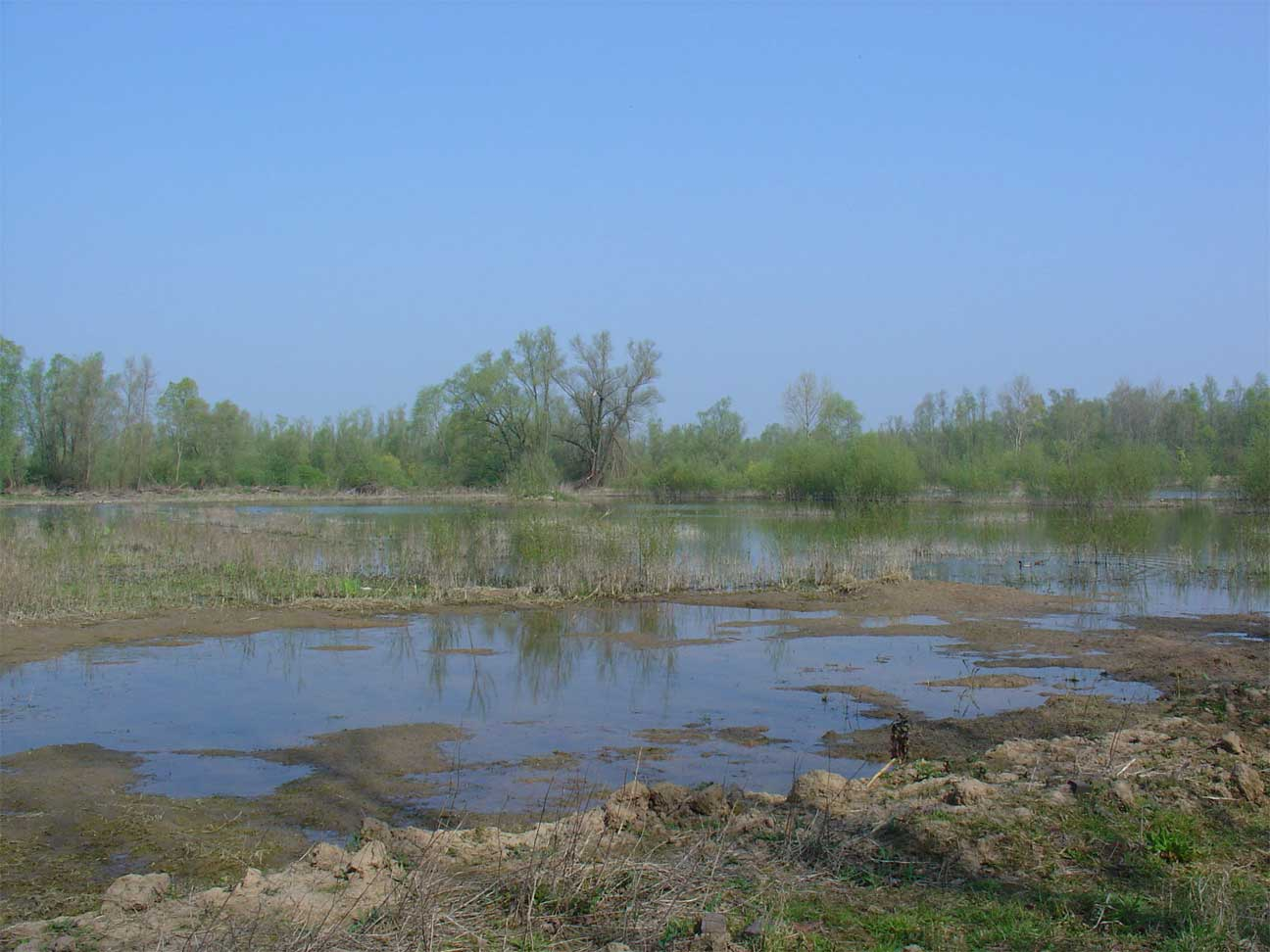
Bijland

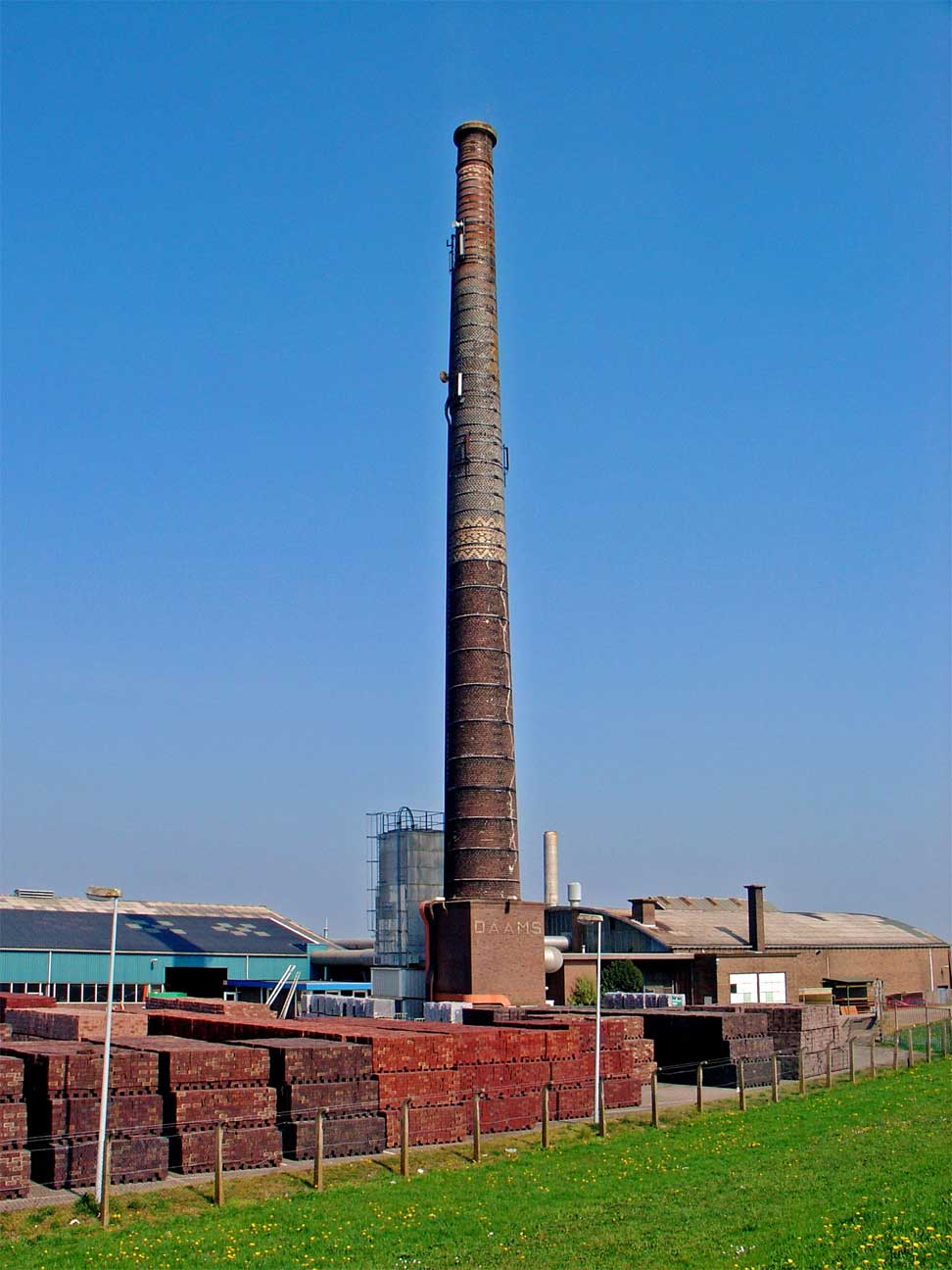
Factory

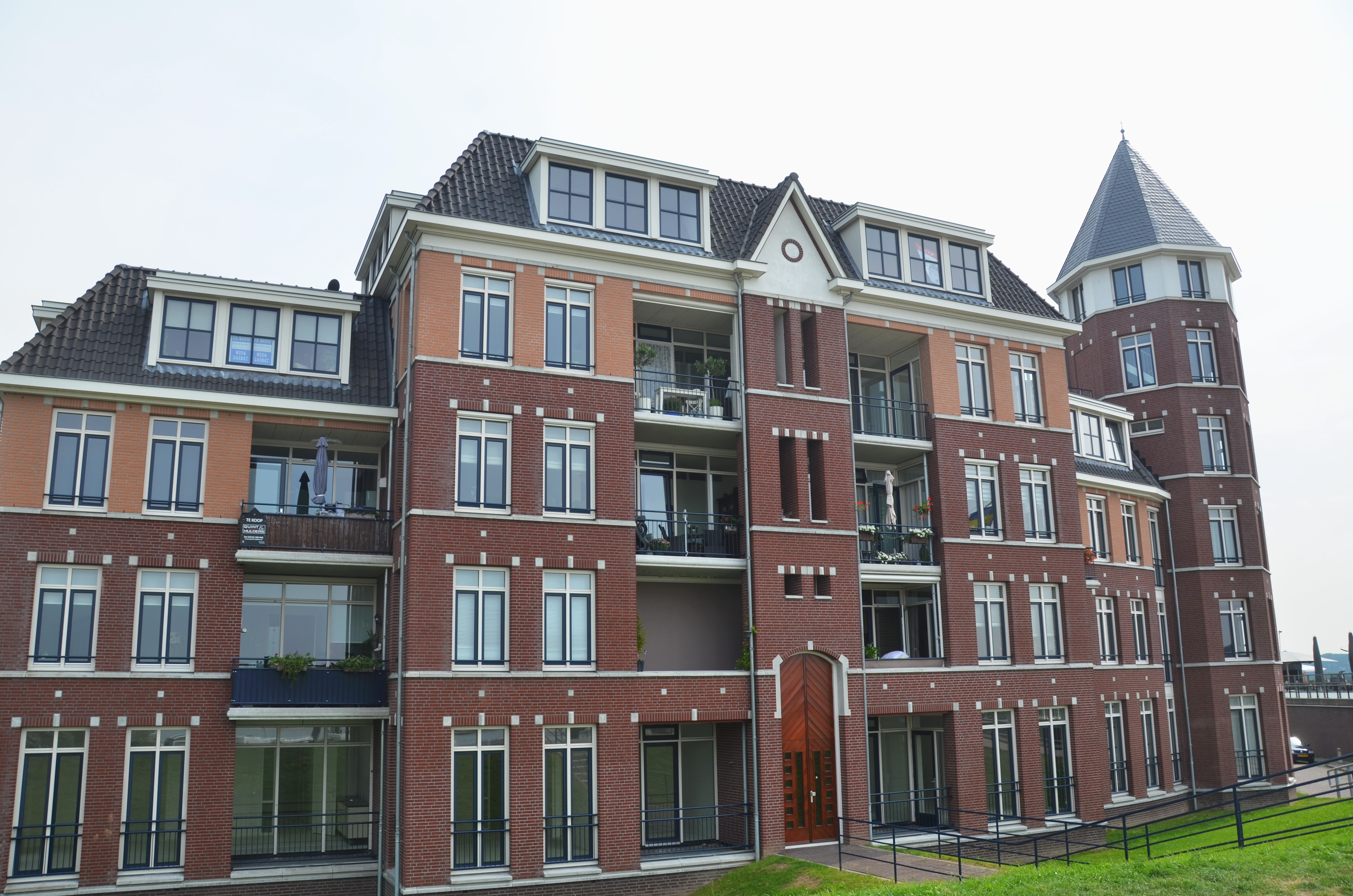
Apartment buildings on the Rhine
