= Spijk, Zevenaar =

Spijk
- Village
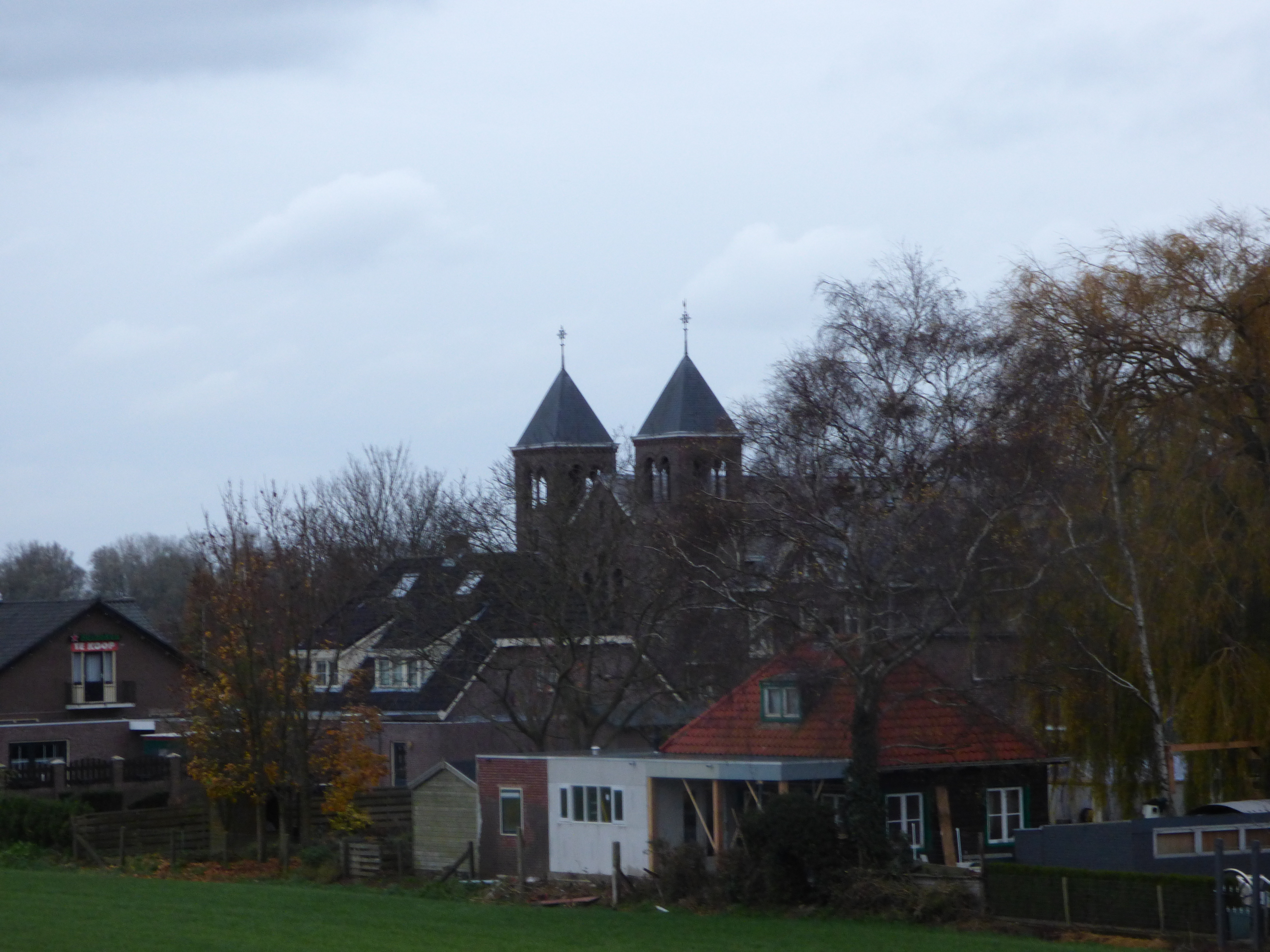

- Location in the Netherlands Spijk (Netherlands)
- Coordinates: 51°50′58″N 6°9′9″E
- Country: Netherlands
- Province: Gelderland
- Municipality: Zevenaar

Area
  - Total: 8.10 km^{2} (3.13 sq mi)
- Elevation: 16 m (52 ft)

Population (2021)
  - Total: 675
  - Density: 83.3/km^{2} (216/sq mi)
- Time zone: UTC+1 (CET)
  - Summer (DST): UTC+2 (CEST)
- Postal code: 6917
- Dialing code: 0316

Spijk is a village in the eastern Netherlands. It is located in the municipality of Zevenaar, Gelderland, near the border with Germany.

Near Spijk, the Rhine crosses the border into the Netherlands.

== History ==
The village was first mentioned in 908 as Herispich, and means promontory of either the lord or army. Spijk developed into a long dike village along the Rhine. The tower of the Dutch Reformed Church dates from around 1250 and was enlarged 1500. The church building dates from around 1500. It was restored between 1965 and 1969. In 1840, Spijk was home to 126 people. In 1914, a Roman Catholic church was built in the village.

== Gallery ==
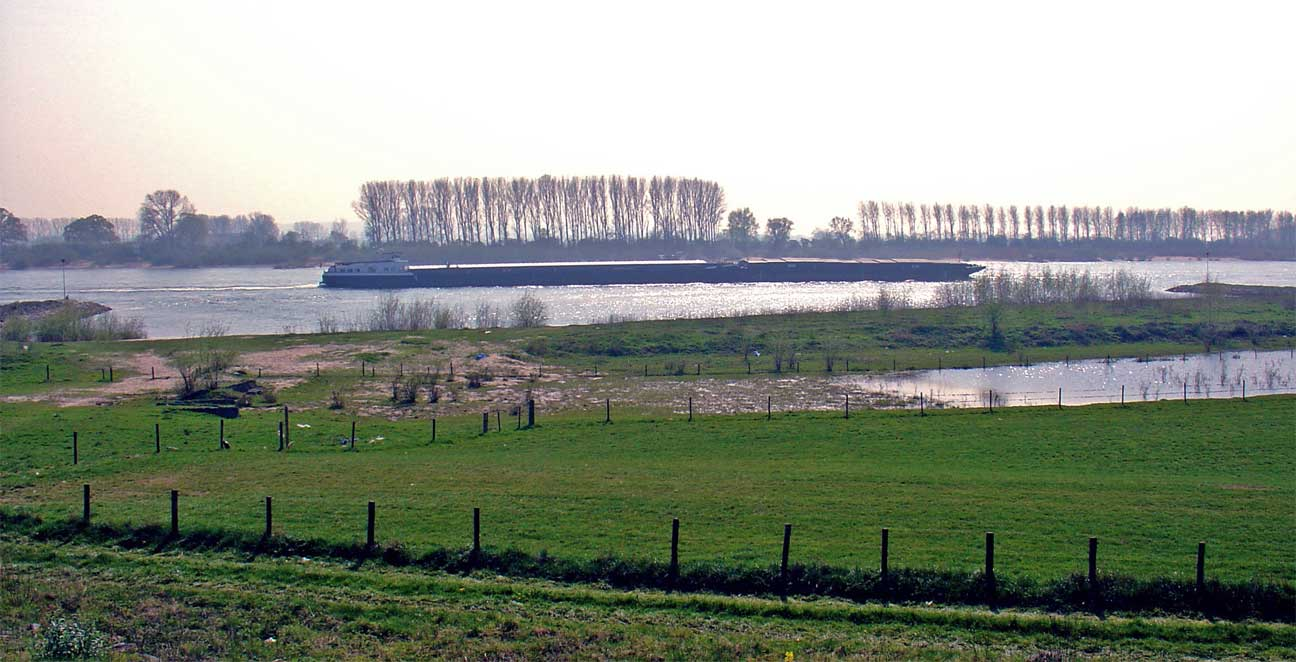
The Rhine near Spijk

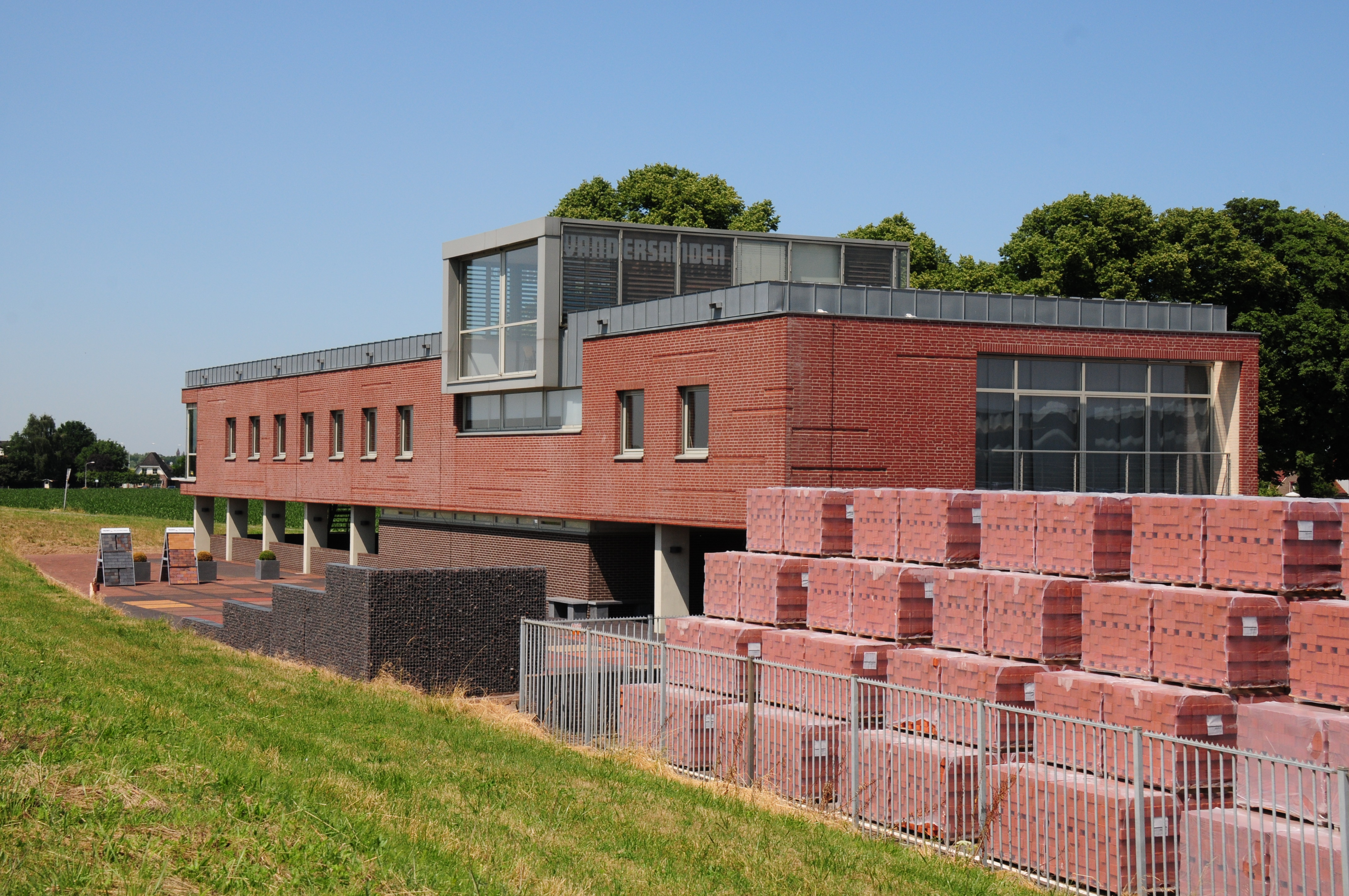
Brickworks

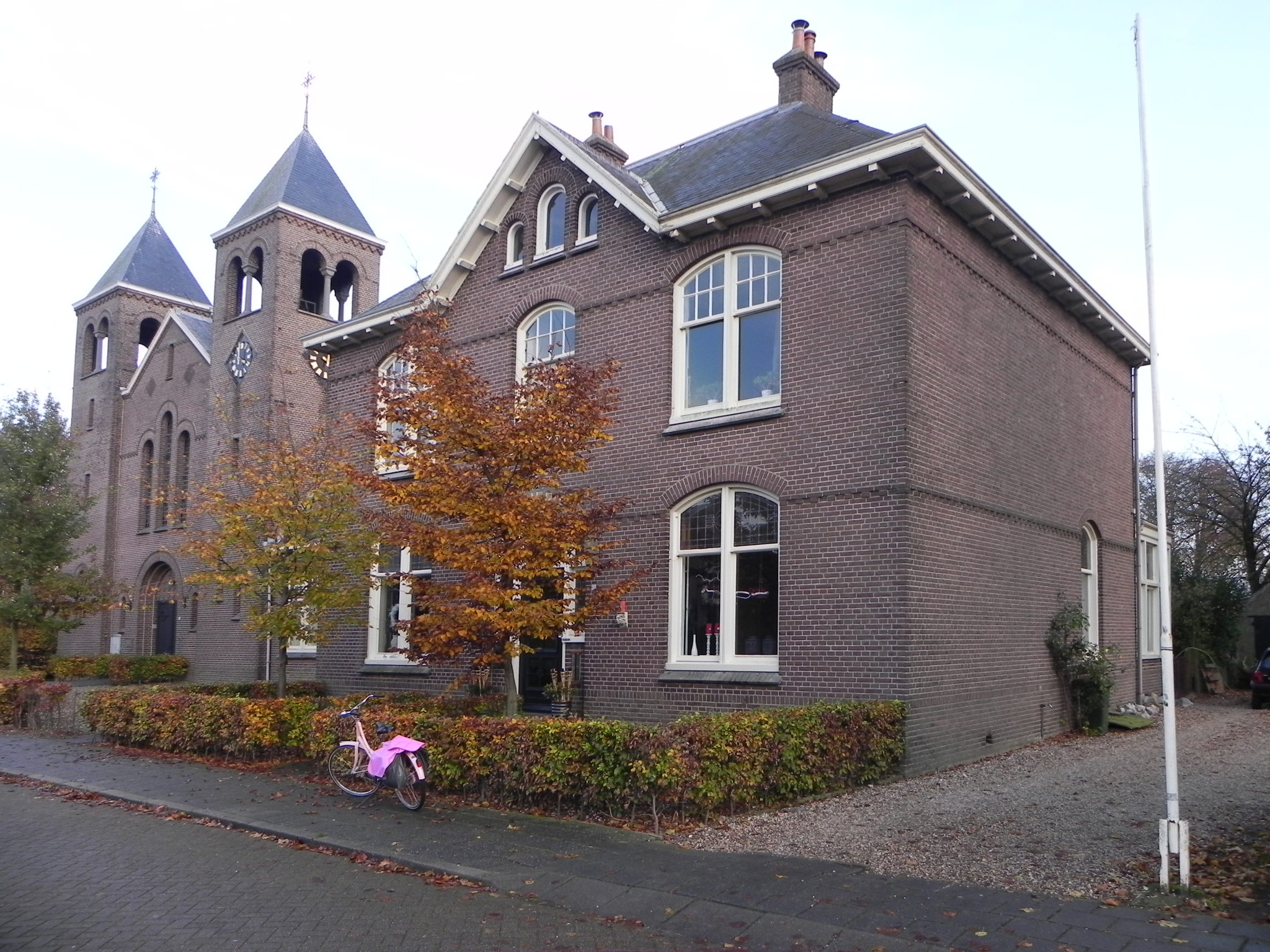
Clergy house

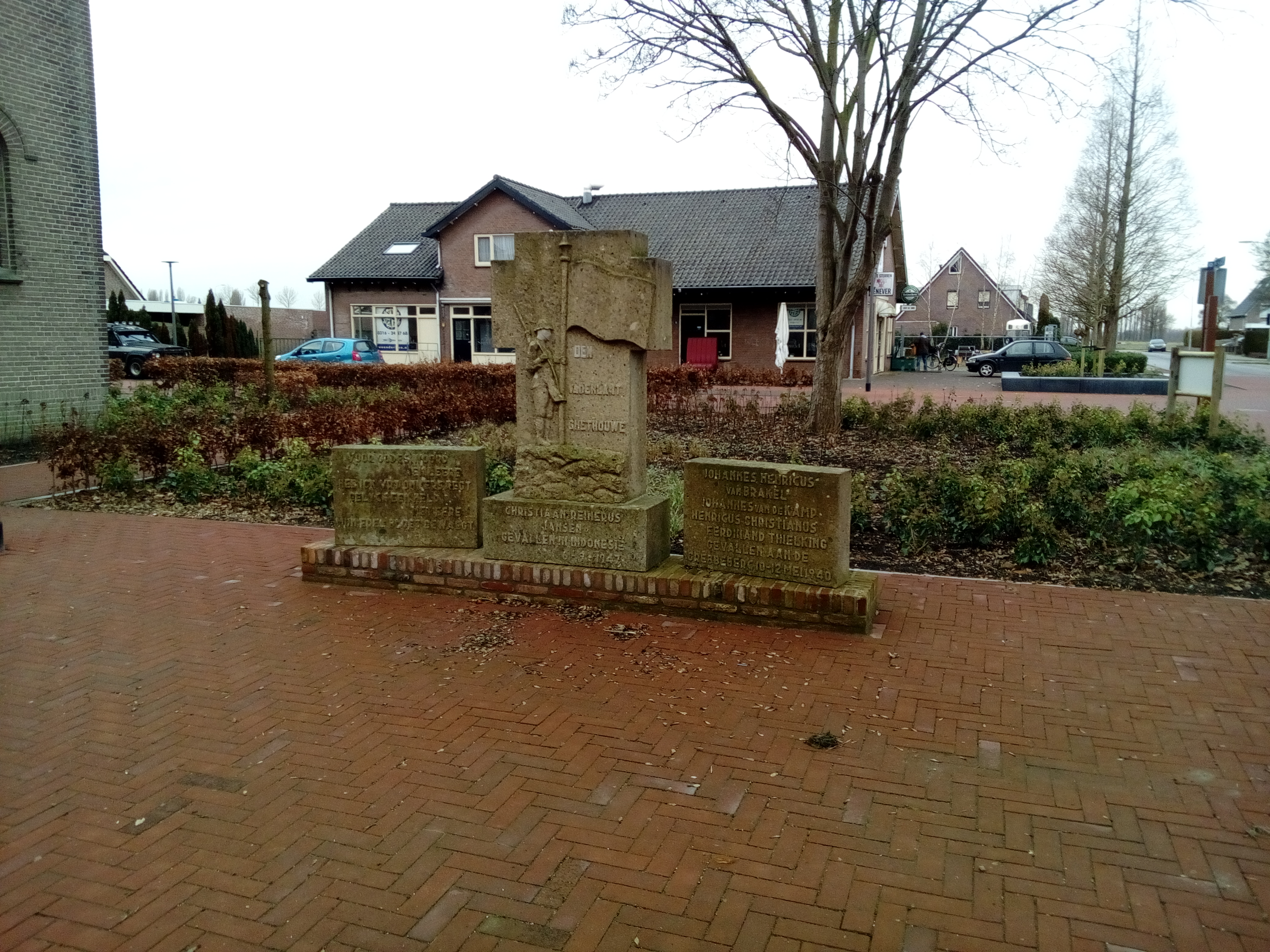
World War II monument
