= Lothair of France =

King of West Francia from 954 to 986

Lothair
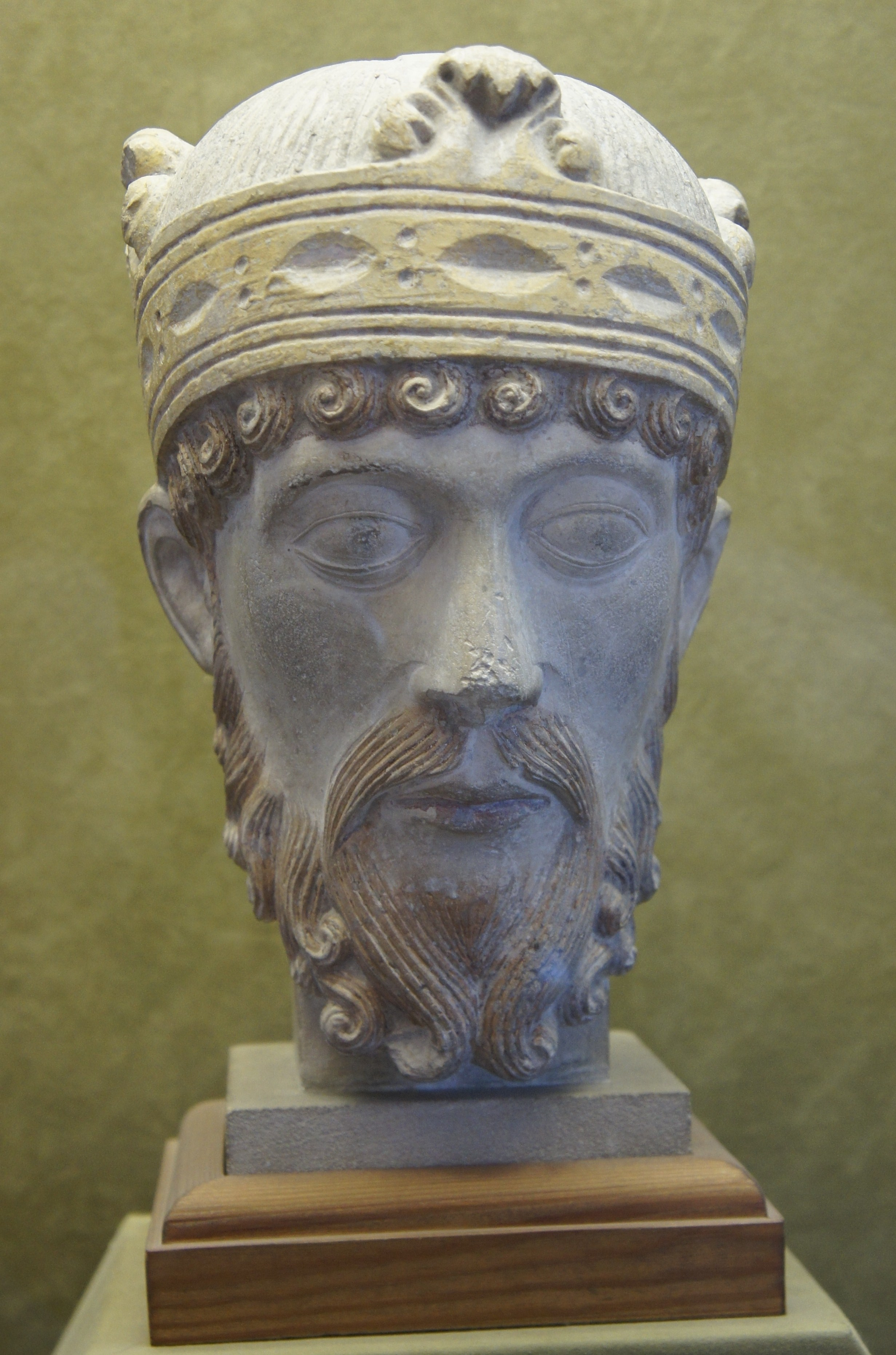
- Bust of Lothair, c. 1140, from the Musée Saint Rémi at Reims

King of West Francia
- Reign: 10 September 954 – 2 March 986
- Coronation: 12 November 954
- Predecessor: Louis IV
- Successor: Louis V
- Rival king: Charles of Lorraine (978–980)
- Born: 941; Laon
- Died: 2 March 986 (aged 44); Laon
- Burial: Abbey of Saint-Remi, Reims
- Spouse: Emma of Italy (m. 965)
- Issue: Louis V of France; Arnulf, Archbishop of Reims (illegitimate)
- House: Carolingian
- Father: Louis IV of France
- Mother: Gerberga of Saxony

Lothair (French: Lothaire; Latin: Lothārius; 941 – 2 March 986), sometimes called Lothair II, (Note: After the emperor Lothair I. Thoison, E. (1888). Les séjours des rois de France: 481-1789. Société historique du Gâtinais. p. 190.) III (Note: Counting Lothair II of Lotharingia, who ruled over modern Lorraine and Belgium. Jonathan, J. (2011). "Caliph, King, or Grandfather: Strategies of Legitimization on the Spanish March in the Reign of Lothar III". The Mediaeval Journal. 1 (2): 1–22. doi:10.1484/j.tmj.1.102535.) or IV, (Note: Counting Lothair II of Italy. Bachrach, D. (2014). Warfare in Tenth-Century Germany. Boydell & Brewer. p. 164. ISBN 9781843839279.) was the penultimate Carolingian king of West Francia, reigning from 10 September 954 until his death in 986.

== Accession ==
Carolingian ruled lands (in yellow) formed a small part of West Francia by the 10th century

Lothair was born in Laon near the end of 941, as the eldest son of King Louis IV and Gerberga of Saxony. He succeeded his father on 10 September 954 at the age of thirteen and was crowned at the Abbey of Saint-Remi by Artald of Reims, Archbishop of Reims on 12 November 954. Lothair had already been associated with the throne since the illness of his father in 951, this being a custom in the royal succession since the founding of the Kingdom of the Franks by the Merovingian dynasty.

Queen Gerberga made an arrangement with her brother-in-law Hugh the Great, Duke of the Franks and Count of Paris, who had been an adversary of Lothair's father. (Note: Following the death of his second wife Eadhild in early 937, Hugh the Great married for the third time between 9 May and 14 September of that year with Hedwig of Saxony, Gerberga's younger sister. This marriage finally produced the longed-needed heirs: three sons (Hugh, Otto and Eudes-Henry) and two daughters (Beatrix and Emma).) In exchange for supporting Lothair's rule Hugh was given rule over Duchy of Aquitaine and much of the Kingdom of Burgundy as more or less a regent. Lothair inherited a fragmented kingdom, where the great magnates took lands, rights and offices almost without any regard for the authority of the king. Magnates like Hugh the Great and Herbert II, Count of Vermandois were always a veiled threat.

In 955, Lothair and Hugh the Great unsuccessfully besieged Poitiers, though they defeated Count William III of Aquitaine in battle during their retreat. With Hugh the Great's death in 956 Lothair, only fifteen, came under the guardianship of his maternal uncle Bruno, archbishop of Cologne, brother of East Francia's king Otto I. With Bruno's advice, Lothair mediated between Hugh's sons – Hugh Capet and Otto, Duke of Burgundy. The King gave Paris and the title of dux francorum (Duke of the Franks) to Hugh Capet, and invested Otto with the Duchy of Burgundy in 956.

== Worsening relations with the Holy Roman Empire ==
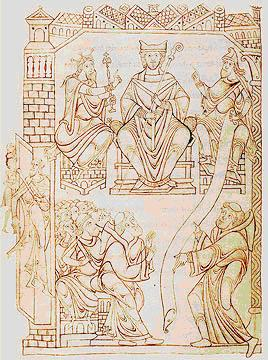
Richard II of Normandy (right), with the Abbot of Mont Saint-Michel (middle) and Lothair (left).

The guardianship of Archbishop Bruno of Cologne lasted until 965 and oriented Lothair towards policy of submission towards East Francia, which was evolving into the German Holy Roman Empire. Despite his youth, Lothair wanted to rule alone and reinforced his authority over his vassals. This desire of political independence led to a deterioration in relations between the King and his maternal relatives and a struggle with the new Holy Roman Empire. Despite this, Lothair wanted to maintain ties with Emperor Otto I by marrying Princess Emma of Italy (the only daughter of Empress Adelaide of Burgundy – second wife of Otto I, from her first marriage with King Lothair II, member of the Bosonids dynasty) in early 966.

In 962 Baldwin III, Count of Flanders, son, co-ruler, and heir of Arnulf I, Count of Flanders died and Arnulf bequeathed Flanders to Lothair. On Arnulf's death in 965, Lothair invaded Flanders and took many cities, but was eventually repulsed by the supporters of Arnulf II, Count of Flanders. He temporarily remained in control of Arras and Douai. Lothair attempted to increase his influence in the Lotharingia, once held by his family, and in turn Emperor Otto II encouraged resistance to Lothair's overtures.

In 976 the brothers Reginar IV, Count of Mons and Lambert I, Count of Louvain, after being dispossessed from their paternal inheritance by Emperor Otto II, made an alliance with Charles (King Lothair's younger brother) and Otto, Count of Vermandois and with an army they marched against the Imperial troops. A great battle, which remained undecided, took place in Mons. Although Lothair secretly encouraged this war, he did not intervene directly to help his brother.

Charles took advantage of the situation and established himself in Lotharingia. His main interest was to break the harmony between Lothair and the House of Ardennes, loyal to Emperor Otto II and very powerful in Lotharingia and to which belonged both the Chancellor-Arbishop Adalberon of Reims and his namesake Bishop Adalberon of Laon.

In 977, Charles accused Queen Emma of adultery with Bishop Adalberon of Laon. The Synod of Sainte-Macre, led by Archbishop Adalberon of Reims, took place in Fismes to discuss the matter. Due to a lack of evidence, both the Queen and Bishop were absolved, but Charles, who maintained the rumors, was expelled from the kingdom by Lothair. The House of Ardennes and the Lotharingian party, who were favorable to an agreement with Otto II, seemed all-powerful at the court of Lothair.

Otto II, however, committed the mistakes of restoring the County of Hainaut to Reginar IV and Lambert I, and of appointing Charles as Duke of Lower Lorraine, a region corresponding to the northern half of Lotharingia, separate from the Upper Lotharingia since the late 950. Rewarding Charles, who had questioned the honor of the wife of the King of the Franks, was a way to offend the King himself.

== War with the Holy Roman Empire ==
In August 978 Lothair mounted an expedition into Lorraine accompanied by Hugh Capet and upon their crossing the Meuse river took Aachen, but did not capture Otto II or Charles. Lothair then sacked the imperial Palace of Aachen for three days, and reversed the direction of the bronze eagle of Charlemagne to face east instead of west. (Note: Richer of Reims stated: "The bronze eagle, that Charlemagne had put on top of the palace in a flight attitude, has been turned back towards the East. The Germans had turned it towards the West to symbolize that their cavalry could beat the French whenever they wanted..." See: Richer of Saint-Rémy, Histoire de France, (888–995), ed. R. Latouche (Paris: Les Belles Lettres 1964), p. 89.)

In retaliation Otto II, accompanied by Charles, invaded West Francia in October 978 and ravaged Reims, Soissons (where he stopped at the Abbey of St. Medard, Soissons for devotions) and Laon. Lothair was able to escape from the Imperial troops, but Charles was proclaimed King of the Franks in Laon by Bishop Dietrich I of Metz, a relative of Emperor Otto I. The Imperial army advanced to Paris, where they faced Hugh Capet's army. On 30 November 978, Otto II and Charles, unable to take Paris, lifted their siege of the city and turned back. The Frankish royal army led by Lothair pursued and defeated them while crossing the river Aisne and being able to recover Laon, forcing Otto II to flee and take refuge in Aachen with Charles, the puppet-King he wanted to impose on West Francia.

In West Francia the hasty retreat of Emperor Otto II had a considerable impact and long after was evoked as a great victory of Lothair. Thus, written in 1015, the Chronicles of Sens gives an epic description: there Lothair was exalted as a warrior-king who pursued the German Emperor to the heart of Lorraine, destroying on the banks of the Argonne a great multitude of enemies, then returned to the Kingdom of the Franks covered with glory. The chronicler say: "As for the Emperor Otto, followed by those of his people who were able to escape, he returned to his country in the greatest confusion; after which neither he nor his army ever returned to France". Contemporary documents speak of the event with the same triumphal accents: written after the retirement of Otto II, a diploma of the Abbey of Marmoutier near Tours dated during the reign "of the great King Lothair, in his twenty-sixth year (of rule; although apparently wrong), in which he attacked the Saxon and forced the Emperor to escape ". These retrospectives were observed by some historians such as Karl Ferdinand Werner as one of the first manifestations of national feeling.

== Reconciliation with the Holy Roman Empire ==
The unity of Western Franks against Otto II had the consequence of placing the dynasty of Robertians in a prominent place in the person of Hugh Capet, whose contemporaries attested that he faithfully served king Lothair. The fight with the Emperor strengthened the power of Hugh Capet, which was shown in 980 when he captured Montreuil-sur-Mer from Arnulf II, Count of Flanders.

Lothair wanted to thwart the ambitions of his exiled brother Charles, and decided to follow his father's steps to secure the succession for his own son. On 8 June 979 Prince Louis was crowned as associated ruler or Junior King (iunior rex) (Note: As the transition from elected kings to hereditary kings took place, fathers undertook to crown their successors before their deaths. See earlier Charlemagne's crowning of his sons, and later Hugh Capet's crowning of his son Robert. Lewis, Andrew W. (1978). "Anticipatory Association of the Heir in Early Capetian France". The American Historical Review. 83 (4): 906–927. doi:10.2307/1867651. JSTOR 1867651. In general see Bouchard, Constance Brittain (2001). Those of My Blood: Creating Noble Families in Medieval Francia. Philadelphia: University of Pennsylvania Press. ISBN 978-0-8122-3590-6.) – although he did not actually assume power until Lothair's death in 986 – being the second time of this new practice in the kingdom of West Francia, which later was adapted by the Capetians.

After this, Lothair began to approach the Holy Roman Empire. The Bishops of Reims and Laon, with the House of Ardennes, supported this rapprochement. In July 980 Lothair and Otto II met at Margut-sur-Chiers on the Frankish border, and concluded a peace treaty. As a part of the agreement, Lothair renounced his rights to Lotharingia, allowing Otto II to turn his military attention to the Byzantine Italy, which he wanted to conquer. This peace was perceived negatively by the Robertians, who were excluded from the negotiations. The Peace of Margut led the Frankish kingdom to be included in the Ottonian orbit, and consequently weakened the influence of the Robertians within the royal government in favor of the Lotharingian nobility. Afraid of being caught between the Carolingian and Ottonian kings, Hugh Capet went to Rome in 981 to contact with Otto II in order to establish his own alliance. Lothair then gave instructions for his capture once he returned.

== Marriage of the heir ==
To counter the power of Hugh Capet as Duke of the Franks, Lothair – following the advice of his wife Emma and Geoffrey I, Count of Anjou – decided to marry his son and heir Louis to Adelaide-Blanche of Anjou, Geoffrey I's sister and the widow of two powerful southern lords, Count Stephen of Gévaudan and Count Raymond of Toulouse, Prince of Gothia. The project of Lothair was ambitious: the restoration of the royal Carolingian presence in the semi-independent south of West Francia, and – according to Richerus – to gain support of southern nobles in his fight against the Robertians.

The wedding between Adelaide-Blanche and Prince Louis took place in 982 at Vieille-Brioude, Haute-Loire, and they both were immediately crowned King and Queen of Aquitaine by Adelaide's brother Bishop Guy of le Puy. However, soon the noticeable age difference between them – Louis was fifteen while Adelaide was a forty-year-old woman – and Louis' debauched lifestyle caused the end of the marriage in 984, with Lothair supporting his son while Adelaide took refuge with Count William I of Provence, who soon became her fourth husband.

However, the existence of the marriage, despite being recorded by relative contemporary and later sources (Richerus, Rodulfus Glaber, the Chronicon Andegavensi and the Chronicle of Saint-Maxence, among others), was recently challenged by historian Carlrichard Brülh.

The failure of the alliance with the House of Anjou reinforced the power of the Robertians, and finally they supported Hugh Capet against Charles of Lower Lorraine in 987.

Emerging from the crisis in Aquitaine, Lothair counted on the loyalty of ten powerful northern bishops of the kingdom and their vassals, and the alliance with the powerful House of Vermandois in the person of Herbert III, Count of Vermandois, his nephew – as son of his half-sister Gerberge of Lorraine. But Herbert III was relatively old and the bishops who had served his father Louis IV were more inclined towards spiritual tasks than to the defense of royal interests. Lothair lacked the ability to implement any large project of conquest consistent with the previous Frankish tradition and to mobilize the aristocracy around him.

== Attempt to recover Lotharingia ==
Emperor Otto II suddenly died on 7 December 983, leaving as heir his three-year-old son Otto III. Henry II, Duke of Bavaria, as the nearest Ottonian relative, obtained the regency of the kingdom without much opposition and abducted Otto III in hopes of being proclaimed king himself. Adalberon of Reims, eager to support Otto III and his mother Empress Theophanu, tried to convince Lothair to support the Empress against the Duke of Bavaria. In the name of Theophanu, Adalberon offered Lothair the recovery of Lotharingia. Shortly after Lothair formally claimed the guardianship of his infant nephew Otto III and the custody of the Lotharingia. Thanks to Adalberon, Lothair obtained the homage of several major Lotharingian nobles including Godfrey I, Count of Verdun, a member of the House of Ardennes. In addition, he reconciled with his brother Charles, who hoped to obtain the Upper Lorraine (at that time ruled by a regent, Beatrix, widow of Frederick I, Duke of Upper Lorraine and sister of Hugh Capet). Lothair then hoped to receive the full sovereignty over Lotharingia. Nevertheless, the quick failure of Henry II's plans foiled the project: by mid-984 Empress Theophanu and Archbishop Willingis of Mainz were able to rescue Otto III and to regain control over Empire. The subsequent peace concluded at Worms between Henry II and Theophanu reaffirmed the end of the Carolingian pretensions over Lotharingia and the triumph of the House of Ardennes, which strengthened its control there.

Lothair refused to renounce the land which he considered rightfully belonging to him: he decided to make an alliance with Henry II, and on 1 February 985 their combined forces arrived to the banks of the Rhine in Brissach. This alliance worried Adalberon of Reims, who contacted Hugh Capet. Henry II did not keep his alliance with Lothair, so the king decided to advance to the Lotharingia alone. At first, he tried to obtain the support of Hugh Capet, but he refused to overthrow his sister and nephew; however, he did not support either party clearly, favoring the Ottonian hegemony. Finally, Lothair obtained the support of the most powerful Counts of the kingdom, Odo I, Count of Blois and Herbert III, Count of Meaux. Shortly thereafter, they invaded Upper Lotharingia, besieged Verdun and, by March of 985, had captured several important prisoners: Godfrey I of Verdun (brother of Adalberon) and his son Frederick, Sigfried, Count of the Ardennes (uncle of Godfrey I) and Theodoric I, Duke of Upper Lorraine (nephew of Hugh Capet).

After returning to Laon, Lothair forced Adalberon to build a fortress in Verdun to prevent the city from being taken by the Imperial forces. He also forced him to write to the Archbishops of Egbert of Trier, Willigis of Mainz and Ebergar of Cologne, stating that he, Lothair, was the true and only heir of the Carolingian Empire.

== Open conflict with the House of Ardennes ==
When the caliph of Córdoba, Al-Mansur, sacked Barcelona in 985, Lothair was ill and could offer no assistance to Borrell II, Count of Barcelona, who had sent envoys to Verdun. This contributed to the final split between the Hispanic March and the Frankish crown during the reign of his successors.

At this point Lothair's power seemed markedly less than that of Hugh Capet. In a letter Gerbert of Aurillac wrote to the Archbishop Adalbero that "Lothair is king of France in name alone; Hugh is, however, not in name but in effect and deed." Not long after, Archbishop Adalberon began openly pressing pro-Ottonian views and tried to influence Hugh Capet into relations with Otto III. When the King ordered the destruction of the fortifications that surrounded the monastery of Saint-Paul in Verdun, Adalberon refused on the grounds that his hungry soldiers no longer were able to keep the city. Furious, Lothair wanted to bring Adalberon to justice. On 11 May 986, Adalberon was summoned to an assembly at Compiègne under false pretences (among them, that he placed his nephew and namesake Adalberon in the bishopric seat of Verdun without royal consent) and charged the surprised archbishop with treason. Alerted, Hugh Capet marched on Compiègne with 6,000 men and dispersed the meeting before a verdict could be reached. Some historians believe that the intervention of Hugh Capet was less motivated by the defence of Adalberon than to obtain the release of his nephew, the young Duke Theodoric I of Upper Lorraine. Lothair could have intended to strengthen his stranglehold on Verdun and its region by forcing Adalberon to pursue his nephew Adalberon of Verdun, son of Count Godfrey I.

Lothair could not afford an open war against Hugh Capet because he would end up caught between two fronts. He then released his Lorraine prisoners, but Godfrey I chose to stay in prison rather than surrender Mons, in Hainaut, and force his son to give up all claims over the County and the Bishopric of Verdun. In the meanwhile, following a meeting between the King and the Duke of the Franks, Theodoric I of Upper Lorraine was released.

== New projects and sudden death ==
In early 986 Lothair intended to attack Cambrai, an imperial city but one dependent on the Archbishoprics of Reims and Liège; he thought that he could convince Bishop Rothard to surrender the city in exchange for his appointment as Archbishop of Rheims (following the deposition of Adalberon) and Prince-Bishop of Liège (whose Prince-Bishop Notger finally escaped to Ottonian territory); but the King suddenly died at Laon on 2 March 986. He received a magnificent funeral and was buried next to his father Louis IV in the choir of Saint-Remi of Reims.

One year after the change of dynasty, Lothair's kingdom seemed indestructible because, even if Lotharingia had not submitted, the inertia of the Empire could let him consider new conquests. According to Richerus: "He was looking for new advantages that could further extend his kingdom. His policy was very successful, and the condition of the Kingdom, favored by the capture of the great nobles, was strong." In fact, in his last years, Lothar deployed both diplomatically and militarily exceptional activity intending to conquer Lotharingia.

== Family ==
With his wife Emma of Italy, Lothair had two sons:

- Louis V (966/967 – 22 May 987), successor of his father as king.
- Otto (c. 970 – 13 November bef. 986), canon of Rheims.

Lothair also had two illegitimate sons with a sister of certain Count Robert, Mayor of the Palace of his brother Charles:

- Arnulf (bef. 967 – 5 March 1021), archbishop of Reims.
- Richard (d. aft. 991).

== Sources ==
- Chisholm, Hugh, ed. (1911). "Lothair, king of France" . Encyclopædia Britannica. Vol. 17 (11th ed.). Cambridge University Press. p. 18.
- Gwatkin, H. M., Whitney, J. P. (ed) et al. (1926) The Cambridge Medieval History: Volume III. Cambridge: Cambridge University Press.
- Hallam, Elizabeth M. & Everard, Judith (2001). Capetian France, 987–1328 (second ed.). Harlow, UK: Longman. ISBN 978-0-582-40428-1.
- Stéphane Lecouteux: Une reconstitution hypothétique du cheminement des Annales de Flodoard, depuis Reims jusqu'à Fécamp, 2004 online
- Ferdinand Lot: Les derniers Carolingiens. Lothaire, Louis V, Charles de Lorraine (954–991), Paris, Librairie Émile Bouillon éditeur, 1891 online.
- Pierre Riché: Les Carolingiens, une famille qui fit l'Europe, Paris, Hachette, coll. «Pluriel», 1983 (reimpr. 1997), 490 p.
- Yves Sassier: Hugues Capet: naissance d'une dynastie, Paris, Fayard, 1995, 357 p.

Regnal titles
Preceded by Louis IV	King of West Francia; 954–986	Succeeded by Louis V
