= Emma of France =

Queen of West Francia from 923 to c.934

Queen consort of West Francia
- Tenure: 13 July 923 – 934?
- Born: 894
- Died: 934? (aged about 40)
- Spouse: King Raoul
- House: Robertians
- Father: Robert I of France
- Mother: Aelis

Emma of France (894 – 934 or 935) was a Frankish queen. The daughter of Robert I of France, she was a descendant of the powerful aristocratic Robertian family; her younger half-brother was Hugh the Great, the duke of the Franks and count of Paris.

In 921, she married Duke Raoul (Rudolf) of Burgundy. Raoul was elected king on 13 July 923 in the church of St Médard at Soissons, by Walter, archbishop of Sens; upon his coronation, Emma became queen. After assuming the crown, Raoul did not relinquish his duchy unlike his Robertian predecessor Odo (Eudes) of France, who had stepped down as count of Paris upon being elected king of West Francia in 888. When Raoul was called away from Burgundy, which was often, Emma administered the duchy on his behalf.

Emma wielded substantial military and political power during her reign, in large part due to her influence as intermediary between Raoul and her brother, Hugh the Great. Her conflicting loyalties afforded her a position of substantial ambiguity and great power. In 931, Emma captured the fortress of Avallon; in 933, she conducted a successful siege of Château-Thierry, the stronghold of her brother-in-law, Count Herbert II of Vermandois.

She was the first Frankish queen who is known to have been formally crowned; her coronation was performed in Reims by Archbishop Séulf sometime in 923, after her husband's coronation.

== Lineage and Early Life ==
=== The Rise of the Robertians ===
Emma was a member of the Robertians, a Frankish aristocratic family in West Francia which eventually gave rise to the Capetian dynasty, whose members ruled France from the accession of Hugh Capet in 987 until 1328. The Robertians' rise to prominence began with Emma’s grandfather, Robert the Strong. Descended from Austrasian nobility, he was a royal military commander and administrative official favored by the Carolingian emperor and king of West Frankish king, Charles the Bald. He defended royal lands in Neustria, as well as several other parts of the region, and was involved in defending against Viking attacks. Despite brief moments of rebellion, he ultimately was made lay abbot of the monastery of St-Martin at Tours, an office that signaled and enhanced his political status within the realm. Although the identity of his wife is contested, he is believed to have been married to a woman named Adelaide, the daughter of Count Hugh of Tours, with whom he had two sons (Odo and Robert) before his death defending Francia against the Vikings north of Angers at Brissarthe in 866.

Following a series of short-lived Carolingian reigns after the death of Charles the Bald in 877, Robert's eldest son Odo, who had succeeded him as lay abbot of St. Martin's and who was appointed Count of Paris in 882, was elected king of West Francia in 888. This marked the beginning of a period of alternation between Carolingian and local aristocratic possession of the throne, culminating in the end of Carolingian rulership in 987. Two significant focuses of Odo's reign lay in balancing Carolingian and Robertian leadership and preventing further Viking attacks. When Odo died a decade later with no heirs, Charles the Bald's grandson, Charles the Simple, was recognized as his successor.

=== Parents and Early Life ===
King Robert I had two daughters. The first is often called Adela by scholars, but her actual name remains unknown. She is the daughter of Robert I’s first wife and she married Herbert II of Vermandois.

Robert I’s second daughter was Emma. Scholars are divided over whether she was the child of Robert’s first wife, or his second wife, Beatrix of Vermandois. Due to the age gap between her and her younger brother, Hugh the Great, who was the son of Beatrix, scholars have largely inferred that she was Robert I’s by his first wife.

We have little evidence about Emma’s childhood, aside from her place within the Robertian family. In 921, she married Duke Raoul of Burgundy, who is also known as Ralph and Rudolph.

=== Robert I and the Election of Raoul ===
Charles the Simple, although crowned in Laon in 893, only was able to gain full control of the West Frankish kingdom in 898 after Odo's death. While his reign was seemingly more widely accepted than Odo’s, most magnates took exception to his rule. His time on the throne was marked by internal dissension as well as Viking attacks, forcing him to allow Robert I to hold Neustria and other parts of West Francia, a decision which allowed Robert I to gain more legitimacy as a ruler. As a result, the kingdom became a kind of “conglomeration” of independent principalities, rather than a united territory.

Despite his powerful position, Robert I exhibited very little interest in gaining the throne, and actively supported Charles the Simple's claim to it. Like his father Robert the Strong, he embraced his role as a military leader and was rewarded with the lordship of the Neustrian territory between the Seine and the Loire.

This situation changed, however, when Charles began to make territorial claims on the western region of Lotharingia, which isolated his other supporters. As historian Jim Bradbury remarks, Charles’ actions with Lotharingia were “too much for Robert, who went home and left Charles to face the other nobles without his support”. In 920, Robert I joined forces with Charles's opponents, a move met with much criticism; his contemporaries called him a tyrant and usurper, and claimed he was envious of Charles’ power. After defeating Charles in 920 and again in 922, Robert I was elected king by an assembly of West Frankish magnates on 29 June 922. This second non-Carolingian ruler would reign for only a year, and was killed in a battle against Charles at Soissons in 923.

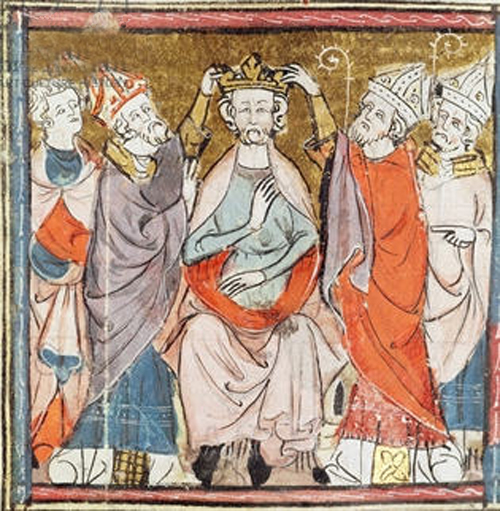
A picture of King Raoul, husband to Emma. He is the figure in the middle being crowned.

Despite Robert's death, Charles the Simple was unable to regain his throne, and was taken into captivity, where he remained until his death in 929. Instead, Emma's husband Raoul was designated by the magnates as the next king of West Francia in 923. As the son-in-law of Robert I, and the son and successor of Duke Richard "the Justiciar" of Burgundy, Raoul marked a transition of sorts between the Robertians and the Carolingians. He was viewed as a “compromise candidate” between the stronger lords, Hugh the Great and Herbert II of Vermandois, who were better prepared to accept him than each other. Notably, contemporaries credited Emma with his successful claim to the throne: Ralph Glaber, a Burgundian monk, reports that when Hugh wrote to Emma asking who should be king, she wrote back stating that she would “rather embrace her husband’s knees than her brother’s”. Ralph thus was elected at Soissons on 13 July 923, and crowned by Archbishop Walter of Sens at the ancient abbey of St-Medard.

== Marriage to Raoul ==
Particularly in times of insecurity and rivalry for the throne, a wife often served as a king's most loyal and trustworthy ally. A wife such as Emma, powerful and clever, was therefore the ideal partner for a new ruler like Raoul, who many considered a usurper due to his lack of direct relation to previous rulers. Marriage to the “beautiful and intelligent’ Emma offered significant advantages. Most notably, she provided him with family connections to the powerful Robertians and her brother Hugh the Great, one of the most powerful magnates in West Francia. These connections helped to strengthen Raoul’s weak claim to the throne.

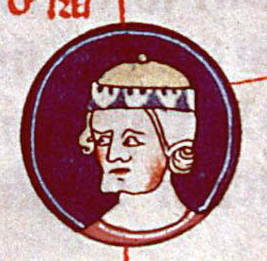
Hugh the Great as depicted in a 14th century family tree of the Robertians.

Their marriage, then, is considered a largely strategic one. Emma played a central role during Raoul’s reign, and provided him with many allies. When the house of Vermandois attempted to restore Charles the Simple to the throne, and called on Athelstan to support them, Hugh the Great instead defended his brother-in-law's claim.

Emma served for many years as the primary intermediary between Raoul and Hugh. Raoul was an outsider in West Francia, while Emma maintained a number of connections to the region's nobility. Emma's influential position and her family connections brought Raoul his greatest amount of support, making her an important figure in the integrity and success of Raoul’s reign.

Unlike many other royal marriages, the union between Emma and Raoul appears to have been monogamous. Their marriage is believed to have produced two children: a son, Louis, and a daughter, Judith. The insecurity of their position and of the West Francia throne appears to have influenced their children’s names; rather than naming them after close relatives, the new parents strategically named their children for Louis the Pious and his wife Judith, positioning them as royal children with a legitimate claim to West Francia.

Not only did Emma provide Raoul significant support in terms of political allies, but she also proved a capable military and political strategist.

== Military campaigns, 927-933 ==
Emma was active in a number of military campaigns and political maneuvers. As the historian Simon MacLean writes, one of her influential contemporaries, the scholar Flodoard of Reims, “mentions Emma’s direct involvement in the politics and military affairs of her kingdom as if it were normal, without gendered criticism,” implying that women wielding such substantial political power was at this point normalized in Francia. For Emma, this power was further augmented by the strength of her birth family. Especially as her brother allied with the Vermandois against her husband, Emma grappled with two opposing senses of loyalty.

=== Laon, 927-928 ===
Following the death of Count Roger of Laon in 926, Herbert II of Vermandois laid claim to the city, and requested that King Raoul make his son Odo (Eudes) count there. Laon was a strategically important stronghold in the north of Francia, built atop a large, steep hill; it also was one of Raoul’s favourite royal residences. Therefore, Raoul, who had already allowed Herbert his seizure of Rheims, granted Laon to Count Roger’s son instead.

Herbert II, insulted, launched an offensive against Raoul at Laon, and in 927 proclaimed Charles the Simple king at St. Quentin. During their reign, the king, following successful military expeditions, had entrusted Emma more and more frequently with custody of the fortified towns which he had taken. Therefore, over the winter of 927-8, Raoul placed Emma in control of Laon; she defended the city adroitly, and Herbert was eventually obliged to capitulate.

In 928, however, when the king left Laon for Burgundy, Emma refused to accompany him out of the city. At the time, Hugh the Great and Herbert II of Vermandois had allied against Raoul; Emma’s refusal to leave Laon thus may have been prompted either by a sense of loyalty to her brother, or by a desire to resist his advances and protect her husband's interests in the north. Only after Raoul negotiated a peace with the two rebels did she depart for Burgundy, leaving Laon behind for Herbert II to seize.

=== Avallon, 931 ===
Three years later, Emma led a campaign to seize the fortress of Avallon from Giselbert, the count of the Burgundian city of Autun, prompting Giselbert’s defection from Raoul’s kingdom (MacLean). Raoul supported Emma's initiative, as the center of his power in Burgundy lay in the counties of Autun, Avallon, and Lassois. At the same time, this campaign also appears to have been a continuation of a longstanding family conflict between the families of Giselbert and Hugh (and thus, by extension, Emma), in which Emma helped to advance her own kindred's goal of eliminating the pesky Giselbert.

=== Château-Thierry, 933 ===
In 933, Emma mounted a successful siege of the Vermandois stronghold of Château-Thierry. In this period, Raoul and Hugh the Great had united against Heribert; therefore, Emma’s marital and familial allegiances were in alignment, making it possible for the siege to enjoy the political and military support of both her husband (whose army she led) and her brother.

== Death and legacy ==
Emma died only a few years later; different sources report her death to have occurred in either 934 or 935. Raoul survived her for only a brief time, dying in 936. Neither of their children would succeed them on the throne, and little evidence about them survives in the years following Emma and Raoul's death.

After Raoul’s death, Charles the Simple's son, Louis IV, was invited back to Francia after having been in exile with his mother in England. He was backed by several magnates and elected the next king in 936. Emma’s brother, Hugh the Great, supported this decision. Perhaps Hugh the Great recognized that Louis was the rightful heir; perhaps he was merely the least contentious option. Hugh the Great became the Duke of Francia, named so by the king, and controlled a number of counties. He also became the lay-abbot of several Robertian monasteries, and was the first Robertian to be called “Capet,” due to the monastic hood he wore as lay-abbot, called a chape or cappa.

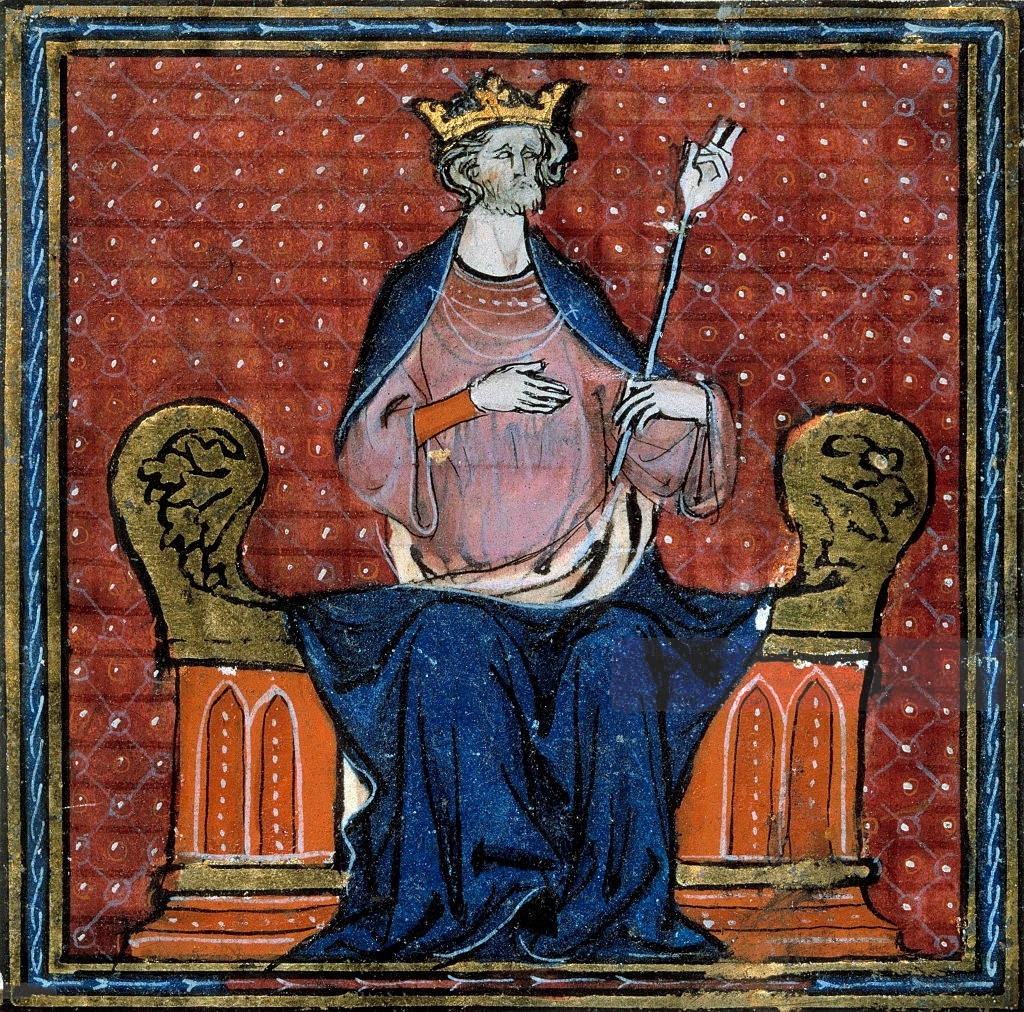
The Coronation of Hugues Capet (941-996), 988. Miniature from a manuscript of the 13th or 14th century.

Hugh's substantial political and military power eventually led to several conflicts with Louis IV and numerous other powerful men in the kingdom. Louis IV, however, remained king until his death, and Hugh the Great supported his son, Lothar, as the next ruler. When Hugh the Great died, his son Hugh Capet took over his father’s position and proved an ally to Lothar. However, the king's policies antagonized Hugh Capet, which precipitated conflict between the two. Following a vision from Saint Valery, in which the saint told Hugh his family would rule for seven generations, Hugh formed an official alliance against Lothar.

While the rebellion was unsuccessful and Hugh and Lothar reluctantly made peace, they never achieved the same partnership they had once exhibited. When Lothar's son, Louis V, became king, he only ruled for one year (986-987) and died childless. While there was some competition for the West Francia throne, Hugh Capet became king with relatively little opposition. Emma’s family, then, found survival in West Francia through her younger brother’s line, and the founding of the Capetian dynasty.

== Sources and Additional Reading ==
- Bouchard, Constance Brittain (2001). "Those of My Blood" : Constructing Noble Families in Medieval Francia. Philadelphia: University of Pennsylvania Press.
- Bradbury, Jim (2007). The Capetians : Kings of France, 987-1328. London; New York: Hambledon Continuum.
- Le Jan, Régine (2001). Femmes, pouvoir et société dans le haut Moyen Age. Paris: Picard.
- Maclean, Simon; Adalbert (2009). History and Politics in Late Carolingian and Ottonian Europe : the Chronicle of Regino of Prüm and Adalbert of Magdeburg. Manchester, UK ; New York : New York: Manchester University Press.
- MacLean, Simon (2017). Ottonian Queenship (1st ed.). Oxford: Oxford University Press.
- McKitterick, Rosamond (1983). The Frankish Kingdoms Under the Carolingians, 751-987. London ; New York: Longman.
- Pennington, Reina; Higham, Robin (2003). Amazons to Fighter Pilots : a Biographical Dictionary of Military Women. Westport, Conn: Greenwood Press.
- Stafford, Pauline (1998). Queens, Concubines, and Dowagers : the King's Wife in the Early Middle Ages. London ; Washington, D.C.: Leicester University Press.

Royal titles
| Preceded by Béatrice of Vermandois | Queen of Western Francia; 923–934 | Succeeded by Gerberga of Saxony |
