= Adalbero II of Metz =

Saint Adalbero II

Abbot Bishop of Metz Bishop of Verdun
- Born: c. 958
- Died: 15 December 1005
- Venerated in: Catholic Church; Eastern Orthodox Church
- Feast: December 14

Adalbero II of Metz (Latin: Adalberonis or Adalberus; c. 958 - 14 December 1005) was a Catholic bishop of the 10th and 11th centuries. From 984 until his death he was the bishop of Verdun and bishop of Metz. He was the son of Frederick I, Duke of Upper Lorraine and Beatrice of France, daughter of Hugh the Great.

== Biography ==
Educated at Gorze Abbey, he was nominated to succeed the Bishop of Verdun, Wigfrid. Instead, Hugues II was chosen, but he renounced his seat after a year, and Adalbero succeeded to the seat.

The death of Dietrich I of Metz on 7 September 984 prevented Adalbero from being officially appointed, and the same year, on 16 October, he was chosen to become the bishop of Metz, leaving the Bishopric of Verdun to one of his cousins, Adalbero II of Ardennes. Adalbero begins a new period of nearly six centuries, during which the see is no longer involved in the affairs of the court and develops a strong soclesiastical life, although troubled frequently by conflicts between the citizens of Metz and the bishops as secular lords.

Thierry of Luxembourg served as his coadjutor, before succeeded to the Bishopric.

At Metz, he favoured monastic reform in his diocese, strengthening the influence of the Cluny order in Lorraine by appealing, amongst others, to Guillaume de Volpiano. He also supported Henry II, Holy Roman Emperor against various marriages of his relatives.

He died on 14 December 1005, and was buried at the Saint-Symphorien Abbey in Metz.

== Sources ==
- https://web.archive.org/web/20120327065511/http://www.saarland-biografien.de/Adalbero-II
