= Franco-German War (disambiguation) =

Franco-German War may refer to any war fought between France and Germany, including:

- Franco-German war of 978–980
- The Franco-Prussian War (1870–1871)
- World War I (1914–1918)
- World War II (1939–1945)

== See also ==
- France–Germany relations
- French–German enmity
