= Itier =

Itier is a surname. Notable people with the surname include:

- Anne-Cécile Itier (1890–1980), French racing driver
- Bernard Itier (1163–1225), French Benedictine monk
- Jules Itier (1802–1877), French customs inspector and amateur daguerreotypist
