= Odo of Paris =

Odo of Paris may refer to:

- Odo, Count of Paris (860 - 898)
- Odo, Duke of Burgundy (944 – 965)
