= Emma of Paris, Duchess of Normandy =

Duchess consort of Normandy (c. 943–968)

Emma of Paris

Duchess consort of Normandy
- Tenure: 960–968
- Born: c. 943
- Died: 19 March 968
- Spouse: Richard I of Normandy
- House: Robertians
- Father: Hugh the Great
- Mother: Hedwig of Saxony

Emma of Paris (c. 943 – 19 March 968), was a duchess consort of Normandy, married to Richard I, Duke of Normandy. She was the daughter of Count Hugh the Great of Paris and Hedwige of Saxony and sister of Hugh Capet, king of France.

Emma was betrothed to Richard I in her childhood as a part of an alliance between Normandy and Paris against the French royal house. The marriage took place in 960. The union gave a permanent and useful status to Normandy, especially since the brother of Emma became king in 987. Emma has been pointed out as the mother of Emma of Normandy, but this is not chronologically possible. Emma died childless.

Preceded by Luitgarde of Vermandois	Duchess consort of Normandy; 960–968	Succeeded by Gunnor
