= Hedwig of Saxony =

Mother of Hugh Capet (c. 910 – after 958)

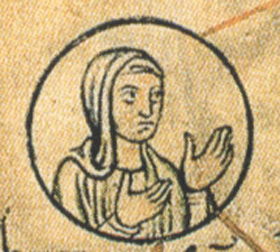
- Detail from the Chronica sancti Pantaleonis, 12th century
- Born: c. 910
- Died: after 958
- Spouse: Hugh the Great
- Issue: Beatrice of France; Hugh Capet; Emma of Paris, Duchess of Normandy; Otto, Duke of Burgundy; Henry I, Duke of Burgundy
- House: Ottonian dynasty (Liudolfings)
- Father: Henry the Fowler
- Mother: Matilda of Ringelheim

Hedwig of Saxony (German: Hadwig; c. 910 – after 958-959) was a member of the Ottonian dynasty and wife of the Robertian duke Hugh the Great. Upon her husband's death in 956, she ruled the Robertian estates as a regent during the minority of their son Hugh Capet, the founder of the Elder House of Capet.

== Life ==
Hedwig was a younger daughter of the Saxon duke Henry the Fowler (c. 876 – 936), elected king of East Francia in 919, and his second wife, Matilda of Ringelheim (c. 895 – 968). Her siblings were Otto I, who succeeded his father as king and was crowned emperor in 962; Duke Henry I of Bavaria; Gerberga of Saxony, who married King Louis IV of France in 939; and Archbishop Bruno the Great of Cologne.

After her brother Otto I came to power in 936, an alliance and marriage was arranged with the West Frankish duke Hugh the Great, who sought support in his struggles with King Louis IV. Hedwig was Hugh's third wife. They married probably in May 937.

When Hedwig's husband died in 956, her son Hugh Capet was still underage. Although Hugh inherited his father's estates, he did not rule independently from the beginning. Along with her brother, Archbishop Bruno, Hedwig acted as Hugh's regent and administrator of the Robertian estates until he came of age. Bruno also held guardianship over his nephew King Lothair of France, son of his sister Gerberga, and temporarily raised to one of the most powerful nobles in West Francia. Hedwig backed her brother in his conflict with Count Reginar III of Hainaut and arbitrated in the rivalry between her son Hugh Capet and King Lothair.

Hedwig is last mentioned in 958 by the West Frankish chronicler Flodoard of Reims and may have died soon afterward; a 965 entry by Sigebert of Gembloux seems doubtful.

== Issue ==
Hedwig had five children with her husband Hugh the Great:

- Beatrice of France married Frederick I, Duke of Upper Lorraine.
- Hugh Capet (c. 941 – 996), who was crowned King of France in 987.
- Emma of Paris (943–968), who married Duke Richard I of Normandy in 960.
- Otto, Duke of Burgundy (945–965).
- Henry I, Duke of Burgundy (946–1002).

== Sources ==
- Bernhardt, John W. (1993). Itinerant Kingship & Royal Monasteries in Early Medieval Germany, c. 936-1075. Cambridge University Press.
- Riché, P. (1993). The Carolingians; A Family Who Forged Europe. Translated by Allen, Michael Idomir. University of Pennsylvania Press.
- Rosenwein, Barbara H. (2009). A Short History of the Middle Ages. University of Toronto Press. ISBN 978-1-4426-0104-8.
- Van Houts, Elizabeth, ed. (2000). The Normans in Europe. Manchester University Press.
- Wickham, Chris (2009). The Inheritance of Rome. Viking Penguin. ISBN 9780670020980.
