= Beatrice of Vermandois =

Queen of West Francia from 922 to 923

Queen consort of West Francia
- Tenure: 922–923
- Born: c. 880
- Died: after 26 March 931
- Spouse: Robert I of France
- Issue: Hugh the Great
- House: Carolingian
- Father: Herbert I, Count of Vermandois
- Mother: Bertha

Beatrice of Vermandois (c. 880 – after 26 March 931) was a Carolingian aristocrat, queen of Western Francia by marriage to Robert I, and mother of Hugh the Great, ancestor of the Capetians.

== Life ==
Beatrice was the daughter of Herbert I, Count of Vermandois. She was also the sister of Herbert II, Count of Vermandois, and was a descendant in the male line of Charlemagne through King Bernard of Italy. (Note: According to the Abbreviatio by Frater Andreas, Beatrice was a great-granddaughter of Bernard, king of Italy. Alberic of Trois-Fontaines, in the 1250s, knew of this descent: MGH SS 23.757.) Through her marriage to Robert I, she was an ancestress of the Capetian dynasty. On 15 June 923 her husband Robert was killed at the Battle of Soissons shortly after which their son Hugh was offered the crown but refused. Beatrice died in 931.

== Marriage and issue ==
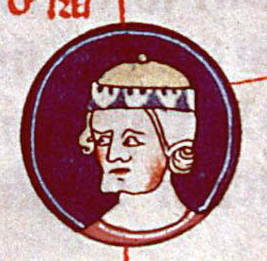
Beatrice's son was Hugh the Great, ancestor of many kings.

Beatrice married c. 890, becoming the second wife of Robert, Margrave of Neustria, who became the King of France in 922. They were the parents of:

- Hugh the Great – father of Hugh Capet

== Sources ==
- Bouchard, Constance Brittain (2001). Those of My Blood: Creating Noble Families in Medieval Francia. University of Pennsylvania Press.
- Fanning, Steven; Bachrach, Bernard S., eds. (2011). The Annals of Flodoard of Reims, 919-966. University of Toronto Press.
- Lewis, Andrew W. (1977). "Dynastic Structures and Capetian Throne-Right: the Views of Giles of Paris". Traditio. 33: 246-47 n.94.
- Riché, Pierre (1993). The Carolingians; A Family who Forged Europe. Translated by Allen, Michael Idomir. University of Pennsylvania Press.
- Tanner, Heather (2004). Families, Friends and Allies. Brill.

Royal titles
Preceded by Eadgifu of Wessex	Queen of Western Francia; 922–923	Succeeded by Emma of France
