= Theodoric I of Upper Lorraine =

French nobleman (c. 965–1026/1027)

Theodoric I Duke of Upper Lorraine
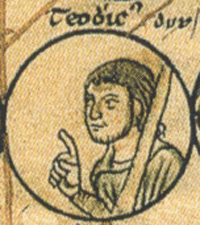
- Born: c. 965
- Spouse: Richilde of Bliesgau
- Issue: Frederick II, Duke of Upper Lorraine
- House: House of Ardenne–Bar
- Father: Frederick I, Duke of Upper Lorraine
- Mother: Beatrice of France

Theodoric I (German: Dietrich I.; French: Thierry I^{er}; c. 965 – between 11 April 1026 and 12 January 1027) was the count of Bar and duke of Upper Lorraine from 978 to his death.

== Life ==
Theodoric was the son and successor of Frederick I and Beatrice, daughter of Hugh the Great, count of Paris, and sister to the French king Hugh Capet.

His mother was the regent until 987. In 985, he joined the other Lorrainer lords, including his cousin Godfrey the Prisoner, in trying to repel King Lothair of France's invasion but, at Verdun, he was captured.

Like almost all the dukes of Lorraine until the Gallicisation of the region in the thirteenth century, Theodoric was loyal to the Holy Roman Emperors. In 1011, he aided Henry II in his war with Luxembourg. He was captured a second time in 1018 in combat with Burgundy but overcame Odo II of Blois, also count of Meaux, Chartres, and Troyes (later Champagne). In 1019, he associated his son Frederick in the government with him. He briefly opposed the Emperor Conrad II, Henry's successor, but soon joined his supporters.

== Family ==
Theodoric married Richilde, the daughter of Folmar III, count of Bliesgau and Metz, in 985. They had the following children:

- Frederick II, his successor
- Adela (b. c. 990), married Walram I, count of Arlon
- Adalbero
- Hildegard, married Fulk III in 1005

He possibly had a daughter, Gisela, who married Gerard de Bouzonville and had a son, Gerard, Duke of Lorraine.

Preceded by Frederick I	Duke of Upper Lorraine; 978–1026 / 1027	Succeeded by Frederick II
