= Beatrice of France =

Duchess consort of Upper Lorraine (c. 938-1003)

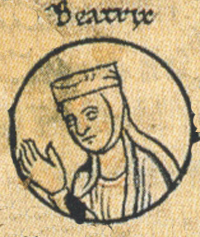
- Beatrice of France in the Chronica regia Coloniensis

Duchess consort of Upper Lorraine
- Tenure: 954 - 978

Regent of Upper Lorraine
- Tenure: 978-980
- Born: c. 938
- Died: 23 September 1003
- Spouse: Frederick I, Duke of Upper Lorraine
- Issue: Henry; Adalbero II of Metz; Theodoric I, Duke of Upper Lorraine; Ida
- House: Robertians
- Father: Hugh the Great
- Mother: Hedwig of Saxony

Beatrice of France (c. 938—23 September 1003) was Duchess consort of Upper Lorraine by marriage to Frederick I, Duke of Upper Lorraine, and regent of Upper Lorraine in 978-980 during the minority of her son Thierry I.

Beatrice was a daughter of Hugh the Great and Hedwig of Saxony, making her sister of Hugh Capet and niece of Otto I.

In 954, she married Frederick I, Duke of Upper Lorraine.

After her husband's death in 978 she acted as regent to her son Thierry during his minority, officially until 978, but effectively until 980.

She travelled to Otto II's court in Verona in 983.

Issue

- Henry (died between 972 and 978)
- Adalbero II (958–1005), bishop of Verdun and Metz
- Theodoric I, Duke of Upper Lorraine

== Sources ==
- Leyser, Karl (1994). Reuter, Timothy (ed.). Communications and Power in Medieval Europe. The Hambledon Press. ISBN 9781852851132.
- Wickham, Chris (2009). The Inheritance of Rome. Viking Penguin. ISBN 9780670020980.
