= Gerberga of Saxony =

Queen of France from 939 to 954

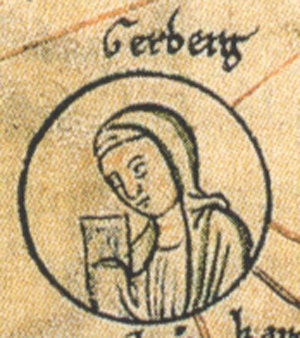
- Gerberga depicted in the Ottonian family tree in the Chronica St. Pantaleonis

Queen consort of West Francia
- Tenure: 939–954
- Born: c. 913
- Died: 984
- Spouse: Gilbert, Duke of Lorraine; Louis IV, King of France
- Issue more...: Lothair, King of France; Matilda, Queen of Burgundy; Charles, Duke of Lower Lorraine
- House: Ottonian
- Father: Henry the Fowler
- Mother: Matilda of Ringelheim

Gerberga of Saxony (c. 913 – 5 May 968/9 or 984?) was the queen of West Francia by marriage to Louis IV of France between 939 and 954. She ruled as regent during the minority of their son Lothair in 954–959.

She was a member of the Ottonian dynasty. Her first husband was Gilbert, Duke of Lorraine. Contemporary sources describe her as a highly educated, intelligent and forceful political player.

== Background ==
Gerberga was born c. 913. She was the older daughter of Henry the Fowler, king of Germany, and his second wife, Matilda of Ringelheim. Her older brother was Otto I of Germany.

== Marriages ==
In 929, Gerberga married her first husband, Duke Gilbert of Lorraine. They had four children:

1. Alberade (b. about 929), who married Renaud of Roucy, a Viking chieftain who became the count of Roucy
2. Henry (b. about 932)
3. Gerberge (b. about 935), who married Adalbert I of Vermandois
4. Wiltrude (b. about 937)

Jocundus, a Lotharingian chronicler writing in the 1070s, recorded that Gerberga was the driving force behind Gilbert's decision to support her younger brother Henry when he rebelled against her older brother Otto I c. 936. Gilbert was defeated by Otto I in 939 at the Battle of Andernach and, while trying to escape, drowned in the Rhine.

When Gilbert died, Gerberga was about 26 years old. She married secondly Louis IV of France in 939. They were parents to eight children:

1. Lothair (941–986)
2. Matilda (b. about 943), who married Conrad of Burgundy
3. Hildegarde (b. about 944)
4. Carloman (b. about 945)
5. Louis (b. about 948)
6. Charles, Duke of Lower Lorraine (953–993)
7. Alberade (b. before 953)
8. Henry (b. about 953)

== Regency ==
Louis IV died on 10 September 954. At this time, his son and heir with Gerberga, Lothair, was only thirteen, and she therefore became regent during his minority. As regent, Gerberga took action to ensure that Lothar could succeed his father. She reached an agreement with her brother-in-law Hugh the Great, who had been an adversary to Lothair's father. In exchange for supporting Lothair's rule, Hugh was given rule over Aquitaine and much of Burgundy. Gerberga did not seek the support of her brother, Emperor Otto I, because the interference of the East-Frankish emperor in West-Frankish affairs would have placed the West-Frankish kingdom in a weak position politically, and angered the West-Frankish nobles.

After the death of Hugh the Great in 956, Gerberga and her sister Hedwig (who was Hugh's widow) were the heads of the two most powerful dynasties in West Francia. Along with their brother, Bruno, who was both archbishop of Cologne and duke of Lotharingia, Gerberga and Hadwig ruled the kingdom, until Lothair came of age.

== Abbacy ==
In 959, after Lothair had come of age, Gerberga became abbess of the Benedictine monastery of Notre Dame in Soissons. Nevertheless, she remained politically active. In 961 she was involved in choosing the new archbishop of Reims, Odalric. In 965 she was present at the imperial court in Cologne, when her son Lothair married Emma of Italy, the step-daughter of her brother Emperor Otto I.

There is some debate about when Gerberga died. She is last documented in May 968. Since necrology records indicate that she died on 5 May, her date of death is often given as 968 or 969. The death date of 5 May 968 is not possible since Gerberga was still alive on 17 May 968 so her death date could only be in 969 or later. Some maintain that Gerberga did not die until 984. She is buried in the Abbey of Saint-Remi in Reims, Champagne.

== Sources ==
- Bouchard, Constance Brittain, Those of My Blood: Constructing Noble Families in Medieval Francia (University of Pennsylvania Press, 2001).
- "Women in power 750-1000" from Guide2womenleaders.com, last accessed January 13, 2007
- Guenée, Bernard (1978). "Les généalogies entre l'histoire et la politique: la fierté d'être Capétien, en France, au Moyen Age". Annales. Histoire, Sciences Sociales (in French). 33e Année, No. 3 (May - Jun.) (3): 450–477. doi:10.3406/ahess.1978.293943. S2CID 154453506.
- Jocundus, Translatio sancti Servatii Tungrensis episcopi et miracula, ed. R. Koepke, MGH SS 12 (Hannover, 1856), accessible online at: Monumenta Germaniae Historica
- W. Glocker, Die Verwandten der Ottonen und ihre Bedeutung in der Politik. Studien zur Familienpolitik und zur Genealogie des sächsischen Kaiserhauses (1989).
- D. Schwennicke, Europäische Stammtafeln Neue Folge Band I. 1
- A. Thiele, Erzählende genealogische Stammtafeln zur europäischen Geschichte Band I, Teilband 1

Royal titles
Preceded by Emma of France	Queen of Western Francia; 939–954	Succeeded by Emma of Italy
