= Bernard Itier =

French Benedictine monk

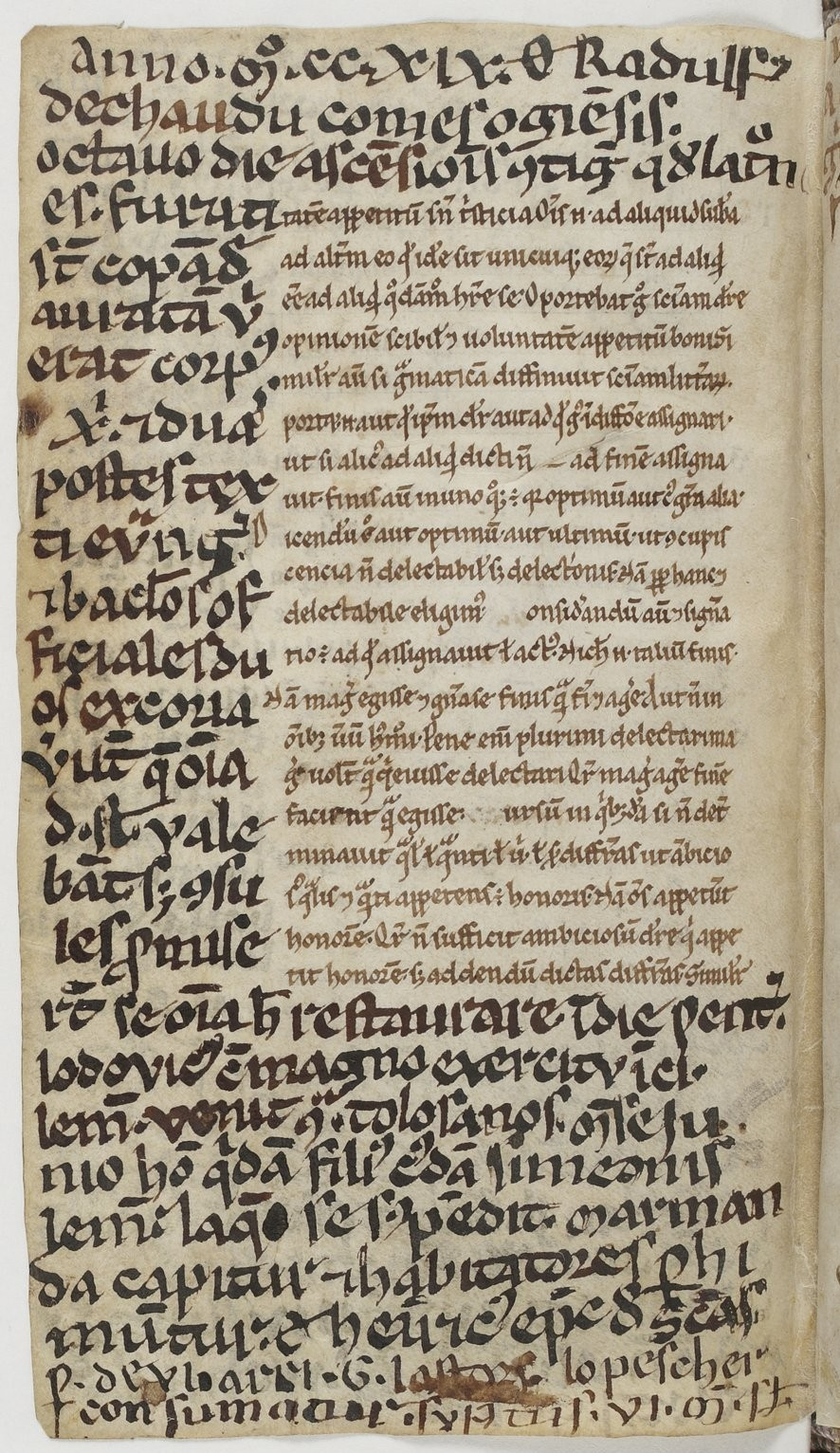
Bernard's chronicle surrounds text from Boethius' translation of Aristotle's Topics on this folio from BnF Latin 1338.

Bernard Itier (Note: Also spelled Ithier; Latin: Bernardus Iterii. The surname Iterii was a family name indicating descent from one named Iterius.) (1163–1225) was a French Benedictine monk, librarian, copyist and chronicler at the abbey of Saint Martial in Limoges.

Bernard was the sub-librarian (subarmarius) of the abbey from 1195 and then chief librarian (armarius) from 1204 until his death. He added numerous historical notes in Latin to the margins of over thirty manuscripts. The most important is the long series of notes in the margins of the manuscript BnF Latin 1338. (Note: See Prosarium Sancti Martialis Lemovicensis at Gallica.) Some modern editors have gathered all his notes together and published them in chronological order, but the marginalia of Latin 1338 can also be regarded as forming a chronicle on their own. Most of Bernard's notes and his chronicle exist as autographs, but a few are known only from copies. This latter class includes his additions to the chronicle of Geoffrey of Vigeois.

Bernard's chronicle is mainly interested in Saint Martial's and in local affairs, but his interest in the Crusades covers a wide swathe from Spain to Byzantium to Egypt and the Holy Land. He has little to say about the Capetian–Plantagenet rivalry, despite being an important source for the last campaign of King Richard I of England. His note on Richard's death is an addition to Geoffrey's chronicle. In another note, he lists fourteen castles belonging to the viscount of Limoges that were besieged by Richard's forces in 1199.

== Editions ==
- The Chronicle and Historical Notes of Bernard Itier. Edited and translated by Andrew W. Lewis. Oxford Medieval Texts. Oxford: Clarendon Press, 2012.
