= West Francia =

Predecessor of France from 843 to 987

Kingdom of the West Franks Francia occidentalis (Latin)
- 843–987
- West Francia within Europe after the Treaty of Verdun in 843
- Capital: Laon
- Official languages: Medieval Latin
- Common languages: Old French; Old Occitan; Frankish dialects (spoken among the kings and nobility)
- Religion: Chalcedonian Christianity (under the jurisdiction of the Church of Rome) (official)
- Demonym: West Frankish • West Frank
- Government: Absolute monarchy
- King
  - 843–877: Charles the Bald (first)
  - 986–987: Louis V of France
- Legislature: None (rule by decree)
- Historical era: Middle Ages
  - Treaty of Verdun: August 843
  - Treaty of Meerssen: August 870
  - Treaty of Saint-Clair-sur-Epte: August 911
  - Capetian dynasty established: June 987
  - Regnum Francie attested: June 1205

Area
- 870: 400,000 km^{2} (150,000 sq mi)
- Currency: Denier
Preceded by	Succeeded by
Francia	Kingdom of France

In medieval historiography, West Francia (Medieval Latin: Francia occidentalis) or the Kingdom of the West Franks (Latin: regnum Francorum occidentalium) constitutes the initial stage of the Kingdom of France and extends from the Treaty of Verdun in 843 to 987, the beginning of the Capetian dynasty. It was created from the division of the Carolingian Empire following the death of Louis the Pious, with its neighbor East Francia eventually evolving into the Kingdom of Germany.

West Francia extended further north and south than modern metropolitan France, but it did not extend as far east. It did not include such future French holdings as Lorraine, the County and Kingdom of Burgundy (the duchy was already a part of West Francia), Alsace and Provence in the east and southeast for example. It also did not include the Brittany peninsula in the west.

West Frankish kings were elected by the secular and ecclesiastic magnates, and between 888 and 936 candidates from the Carolingian and Robertian houses were alternately chosen as monarchs. By this time the power of the king became weaker and more nominal, as the regional dukes and nobles became more powerful in their semi-independent regions. The Robertians, after becoming counts of Paris and dukes of Italy became kings themselves and established the Capetian dynasty after 987. Historians generally define this as the gradual transition toward the Kingdom of France. By the 13th century, the term Regnum francorum had evolved into Regnum Francia ("kingdom of France"), although the demonym of "Franks" continued to be attested as late as the 18th century.

== Formation and boundaries ==
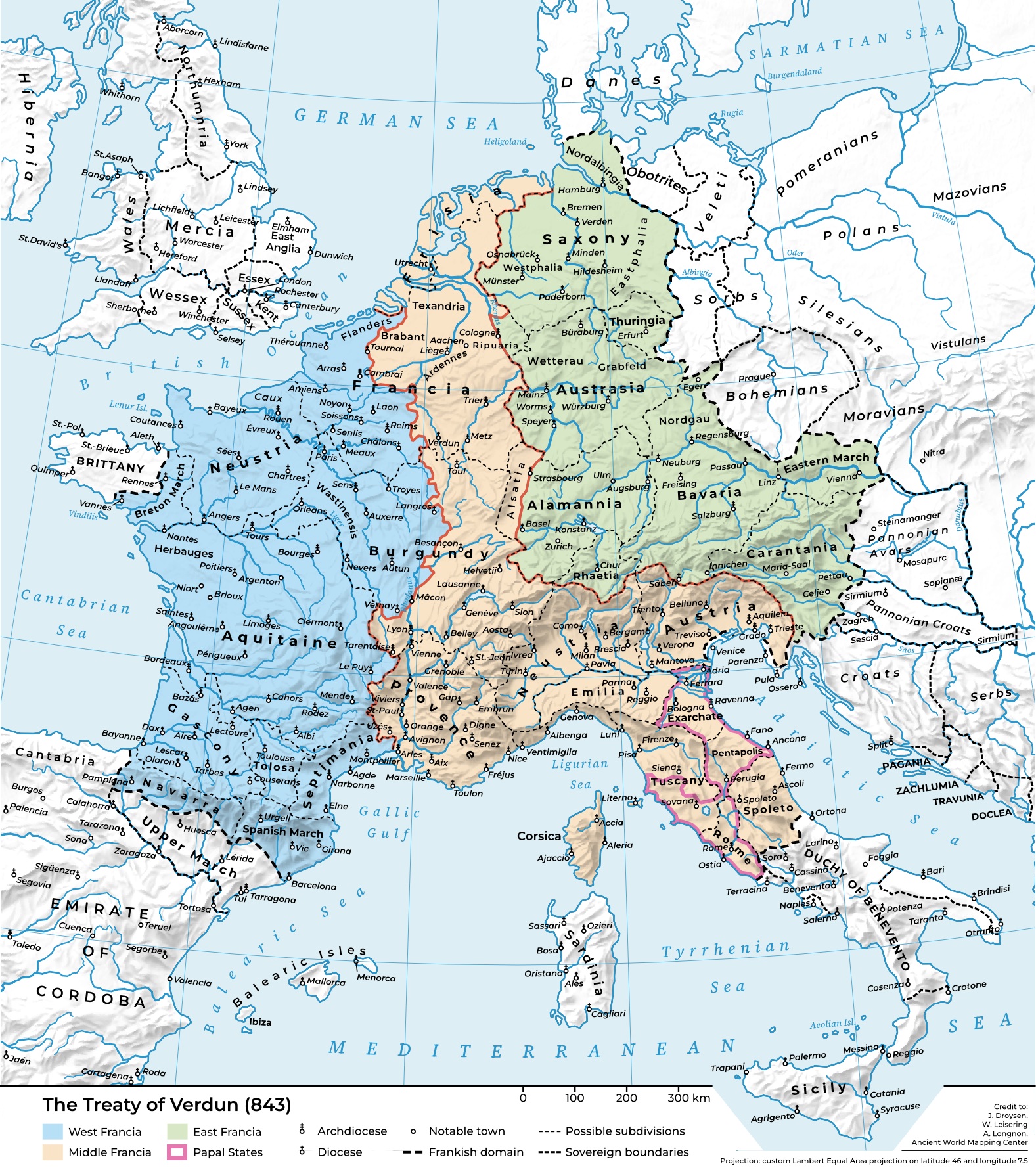
Division of the Carolingian Empire after the Treaty of Verdun in 843

In August 843, after three years of civil war following the death of Louis the Pious, the Treaty of Verdun was signed by his three sons and heirs. The youngest, Charles the Bald, received western Francia. The contemporary West Frankish Annales Bertiniani describes Charles arriving at Verdun, "where the distribution of portions" took place. After describing the portions of his brothers, Lothair the Emperor (Middle Francia) and Louis the German (East Francia), he notes that "the rest as far as Spain they ceded to Charles". The Annales Fuldenses of East Francia describe Charles as holding the western part after the kingdom was "divided in three".

Since the death of King Pippin I of Aquitaine in 838, his son had been recognised by the Aquitainian nobility as King Pippin II of Aquitaine, although the succession had not been recognised by the emperor. Charles the Bald was at war with Pippin II from the start of his reign in 840, and the Treaty of Verdun ignored the claimant and assigned Aquitaine to Charles. Accordingly, in June 845, after several military defeats, Charles signed the Treaty of Benoît-sur-Loire and recognised his nephew's rule. This agreement lasted until 25 March 848, when the Aquitainian barons recognised Charles as their king. Thereafter Charles's armies had the upper hand, and by 849 had secured most of Aquitaine. In May, Charles had himself crowned "King of the Franks and Aquitainians" in Orléans. Archbishop Wenilo of Sens officiated at the coronation, which included the first instance of royal unction in West Francia. The idea of anointing Charles may be owed to Archbishop Hincmar of Reims, who composed no less than four ordines describing appropriate liturgies for a royal consecration. By the 858 Synod of Quierzy, Hincmar was claiming that Charles was anointed to the entire West Frankish kingdom. With the 870 Treaty of Meerssen, the western part of Lotharingia was added to West Francia. In 875 Charles the Bald was crowned Emperor of Rome.

The last record in the Annales Bertiniani dates to 882, and so the only contemporary narrative source for the next 18 years in West Francia is the Annales Vedastini. The next set of original annals from the West Frankish kingdom are those of Flodoard, who began his account with the year 919.

== Charles the Fat ==
Division of the Carolingian Empire after the Treaty of Meerssen in 870

After the death Carloman II in 884, the West Frankish nobles elected his uncle Charles the Fat, already king in East Francia and the Kingdom of Italy, as their king. He was probably crowned "King in Gaul" (rex in Gallia) on 20 May 885 at Grand. His reign was the only time after the death of Louis the Pious that all of Francia was re-united under one ruler. In his capacity as king of West Francia, he seems to have granted the royal title and perhaps regalia to the semi-independent ruler of Brittany, Alan I. His handling of the Viking siege of Paris in 885–86 greatly reduced his prestige. In November 887 his nephew Arnulf of Carinthia revolted and assumed the title as King of the East Franks. Charles retired and soon died in 888.

In Aquitaine, Duke Ranulf II may have had himself recognised as king, but he only lived another two years. Although Aquitaine did not become a separate kingdom, it was largely outside the control of the West Frankish kings. Odo, Count of Paris, was then elected by nobles as the new king of West Francia and was crowned the next month. At this point, West Francia was composed of Neustria in the west and in the east by Francia proper, the region between the Meuse and the Seine.

== Rise of Robertians ==
After the 860s, Lotharingian noble Robert the Strong became increasingly powerful as count of Anjou, Touraine and Maine. Robert's brother Hugh, abbot of Saint-Denis, was given control over Austrasia by Charles the Bald. Robert's son Odo was elected king in 888. Odo's brother Robert I ruled between 922 and 923 and was followed by Rudolph from 923 until 936. Hugh the Great, son of Robert I, was elevated to the title "duke of the Franks" by King Louis IV. In 987 Hugh's son Hugh Capet was elected king, and the Capetian dynasty began. At this point they controlled very little beyond the Île-de-France.

The control of Carolingian kings had shrunk greatly by the 10th century (in yellow).

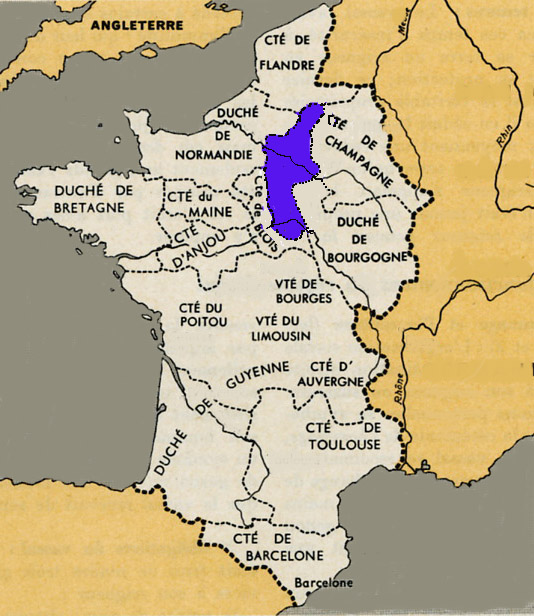
Royal lands (in blue) by the end of the 10th century

Outside the old Frankish territories and in the south local nobles were semi-independent after 887 as duchies were created: Burgundy, Aquitaine, Brittany, Gascony, Normandy, Champagne and the County of Flanders.

The power of the kings continued to decline, together with their inability to resist the Vikings and to oppose the rise of regional nobles who were no longer appointed by the king but became hereditary local dukes. In 877 Boso of Provence, brother-in-law of Charles the Bald, crowned himself as the king of Burgundy and Provence. His son Louis the Blind was king of Provence from 890 and emperor between 901 and 905. Rudolph II of Burgundy established the Kingdom of Burgundy in 933.

== Charles the Simple ==
After the death of East Francia's last Carolingian king Louis the Child, Lotharingia switched allegiance to King Charles the Simple of West Francia. After 911 the Duchy of Swabia extended westwards and added lands of Alsace. Baldwin II of Flanders became increasingly powerful after the Odo's death in 898, gaining Boulogne and Ternois from Charles. The territory over which Charles exercised actual control shrank considerably and was reduced to lands between Normandy and river Loire. The royal court usually stayed in Rheims or Laon.

Norsemen began settling in Normandy, and from 919 Magyars invaded repeatedly. In the absence of strong royal power, invaders were engaged and defeated by local nobles, like Richard of Burgundy and Robert of Neustria, who defeated Viking leader Rollo in 911 at Chartres. The Norman threat was eventually ended, with the last Danegeld paid in 926. Richard and Robert became increasingly opposed to Charles, and in 922 they deposed him and elected Robert I as king. After Robert's death in 923, nobles elected Rudolf as king and kept Charles imprisoned until his death in 929. After the rule of King Charles the Simple, local dukes began issuing their own currency.

== Rudolf ==
King Rudolf was supported by his brother Hugh the Black and son of Robert I, Hugh the Great. Dukes of Normandy refused to recognise Rudolf until 933. Rudolf had to move with his army against the southern nobles to receive their homage and loyalty, however, the count of Barcelona managed to avoid this completely.

After 925 Rudolf was involved in a war against the rebellious Herbert II, Count of Vermandois, who received support from kings Henry the Fowler and Otto I of East Francia. The rebellion continued until Herbert's death in 943.

== Louis IV ==
King Louis IV and Duke Hugh the Great were married to sisters of Otto I, who after the deaths of their husbands managed Carolingian and Robertine rule together with their brother Bruno the Great, archbishop of Cologne, as regent. After further victories by Herbert II, Louis was rescued only with the help of the large nobles and Otto I. In 942 Louis gave up Lotharingia to Otto I. Succession conflict in Normandy led to war in which Louis was betrayed by Hugh the Great and captured by Danish prince Harald who eventually released him to the custody of Hugh, who freed Louis after receiving Laon as a compensation.

== Last Carolingians: Lothair and Louis V ==
The Dukes of Lotharingia, first Conrad (son-in-law of Otto the Great) followed by Bruno, exercised hegemony in West Francia on behalf of the Ottonians, in conjunction with Ottonian widows Gerberga and Hadwig also exercising regencies over their minor sons Lothair. In Cologne, Bruno would convene assemblies with local magnates, similar to the assemblies of Burgundian magnates in Basle and the Italian assemblies in Verona and Constance. This Ottonian hegemony in West Francia, dependent on family ties, gradually weakened after the deaths of the Bruno in 965 and the death of Gerberga in 969.

Louis' widow Gerberga ruled as regent during the minority of their son Lothair in 954–959. The 13-year old Lothair inherited all the lands of his father. By this time they were so small that the Carolingian practice of dividing lands among the sons was not followed, and Lothair's brother Charles received nothing. In 966 Lothair married Emma, stepdaughter of his maternal uncle Otto I. Despite this, in 978 Lothair attacked the old imperial capital Aachen. Otto II retaliated by attacking Paris but was defeated by the combined forces of King Lothair and nobles, and peace was signed in 980, ending the Franco-German war.

Lothair managed to increase his power, but this was reversed with the coming of age of Hugh Capet, who began forming new alliances of nobles and was elected as king in 987 after Lothair and his son and successor Louis V of France had both died prematurely, traditionally marking the end of the French branch of Carolingian dynasty as well as the end of West Francia as a kingdom. Hugh Capet would be the first ruler of a new royal house, the House of Capet, who would rule France through the High Middle Ages.

== List of kings ==
- Charles II the Bald (843–877)
- Louis II the Stammerer (877–879)
- Louis III of France (879–882)
- Carloman II (882–884)
- Charles the Fat (885–888)
- Odo of France (888–898)
- Charles III the Simple (898–922)
- Robert I of France (922–923)
- Rudolph of France (923–936)
- Louis IV of France (936–954)
- Lothair of France (954–986)
- Louis V of France (986–987)

== See also ==
- France in the Middle Ages
