= James Pounder Whitney =

British ecclesiastical historian

James Pounder Whitney (30 November 1857, Marsden, West Yorkshire – 17 June 1939, Cambridge) was a British ecclesiastical historian.

Educated at King James's Grammar School, Almondbury and Owens College, Manchester, he was a foundation scholar at King's College, Cambridge, gaining firsts in the mathematics and history triposes in 1881. A fellow of King's College, he was ordained an Anglican priest in 1895. After various clerical and teaching appointment, he was professor of ecclesiastical history at King's College London from 1908 to 1918. He was Dixie Professor of Ecclesiastical History at the University of Cambridge from 1919 to 1939. He was joint editor of The Cambridge Medieval History from 1907 to 1922.

== Works ==
- The higher criticism: A sermon, together with an open letter to His Lordship the Bishop-Coadjutor of Montreal with reference to his Provincial Synod sermon (1904)
- The Reformation: Being an Outline of the History of the Church from A. D. 1503 to A. D. 1648 (1907), later editions as History of the Reformation
- Pope Gregory VII and the Hildebrandine ideal (1910)
- The Cambridge Medieval History: Volume II: The Rise Of The Saracens And The Foundation Of The Western Empire (1913) editor with J. B. Bury and Henry Melvill Gwatkin
- Hildebrandine Essays (1932)
- Reformation Essays (1939)
