= Andrew W. Lewis =

American historian (1943–2017)

- Born: September 5, 1943; Savannah, Georgia
- Died: October 24, 2017 (aged 74); Springfield, Missouri
- Education: Dartmouth College; University of Chicago; Harvard University
- Occupation: Professor of History
- Years active: 1973–present
- Employer: Missouri State University
- Known for: Research in medieval Europe and the Renaissance
- Notable work: Royal Succession in Capetian France: Studies on Familial Order and the State (1981)
- Awards: MacArthur Fellowship, (1984); John Nicholas Brown Prize, best first book in any area of medieval studies, Medieval Academy of America (1985)

Andrew W. Lewis (5 September 1943 – 24 October 2017) was an American historian and professor at Missouri State University. His areas of interest were medieval Europe and the Renaissance.

== Awards and honors ==
- Session 8: Autour du livre d'Andrew Lewis, Le Sang royal. La famille capétienne et l'Etat, France, Xe-XIVe siècles/ Royal Succession in Capetian France: Studies on Familial Order and the State, 1981
- MacArthur Fellows Program, 1984.
- John Nicholas Brown Prize, 1985.
- John D. and Catherine T. MacArthur Foundation, 1984–1989.
- International Medieval Society Annual Symposium, June 2008.

== Works ==
- "Anticipatory Association of the Heir in Early Capetian France", The American Historical Review 83.4 (October 1978:906-927)
- "The Capetian apanages and the nature of the French kingdom ", Journal of Medieval History, Volume 2, Issue 2, June 1976, Pages 119-134
- Royal succession in Capetian France: studies on familial order and the state, Harvard University Press, 1981, ISBN 978-0-674-77985-3
- "The Birth and Childhood of King John: Some Revisions," Eleanor of Aquitaine; Lord and Lady, Edited Bonnie Wheeler, John C. Parsons, Palgrave Macmillan, January 2003, ISBN 0-312-29582-0
- English translation of French chronicler Bernard Itier's The chronicle and historical notes of Bernard Itier
