= Frederick I of Upper Lorraine =

Lotharingian nobleman (c. 912–978)

Frederick I (c. 912 – 18 May 978) was the count of Bar and duke of Upper Lorraine. He was a son of Wigeric, count of Bidgau, also count palatine of Lorraine, and Cunigunda, and thus a sixth-generation descendant of Charlemagne.

In 954, he married Beatrice, daughter of Hugh the Great, count of Paris, and Hedwig of Saxony. He received in dowry the revenues of the abbey of Saint-Denis in Lorraine. To stop incursions from the duchy of Champagne, Frederick constructed a castle over the Ornain River in 960, and later occupied the confiscated lands of Saint-Mihiel. He exchanged fiefs with the bishop of Toul. Thus, he created his feudal domain, the county of Bar. So he became the founder of the House of Bar or the House of Ardennes–Bar, a cadet branch of the House of Ardennes.

The duchy of Lorraine was at that time governed by the archbishop of Cologne, Bruno, who was called the archduke on account of his dual title. In 959, Bruno, in concert with his brother, Emperor Otto I, divided the duchy, appointing as margraves: Godfrey in Lower Lorraine and Frederick in Upper Lorraine. After Bruno died in 977, Frederick and Godfrey styled themselves dukes.

As duke, Frederick oversaw the reform of Saint-Dié and Moyenmoutier.

== Family ==
Frederick and Beatrice had:

- Henry (died between 972 and 978)
- Adalbero II (958–1005), bishop of Verdun and Metz
- Theodoric I, Duke of Upper Lorraine (965–1026), count of Bar and duke of Upper Lorraine

== Sources ==
- Evergates, Theodore (1995). "Bar-le-Duc". In Kibler, William W.; Zinn, Grover A. (eds.). Medieval France: An Encyclopedia. Garland Publishing, Inc.
- Le Jan, Régine (2003). Famille et pouvoir dans le monde franc (VIIe-Xe siècle), Essai d’anthropologie sociale (in French). Éditions de la Sorbonne.
- Leyser, Karl (1994). Reuter, Timothy (ed.). Communications and Power in Medieval Europe. The Hambledon Press.
- Nash, Penelope (2017). Empress Adelheid and Countess Matilda: Medieval Female Rulership and the Foundations of European Society. Palgrave Macmillan.
- Reuter, Timothy, ed. (1992). Warriors and Churchmen in the High Middle Ages: Essays Presented to Karl Leyser. The Hambledon Press.
- Wickham, Chris (2009). The Inheritance of Rome. Viking Penguin.

Preceded by none	Duke of Upper Lorraine; 942–978	Succeeded by Thierry I
