= Otto, Duke of Burgundy =

Otto of Burgundy

Duke of Burgundy
- Reign: 956 – 22 February 965
- Predecessor: Gilbert, Duke of Burgundy
- Successor: Henry I, Duke of Burgundy
- Born: c. 944; Paris
- Died: 22 February 965
- Spouse: Liutgarde
- House: Robertians
- Father: Hugh the Great
- Mother: Hedwig of Saxony

Otto of Burgundy (c. 944 – 22 February 965) was Duke of Burgundy from 956 to his death.

Otto was a son of Hugh the Great, duke of the Franks, and his wife Hedwig of Saxony, a sister of Otto I, Holy Roman Emperor. He was a brother of King Hugh Capet of France.

He became duke through his wife Liutgarde, daughter of Gilbert, who held most of the counties of Burgundy. He had no known descendants.

His brother, Henry I, Duke of Burgundy, succeeded him as Duke of Burgundy.

Preceded by Gilbert, Duke of Burgundy (father-in-law)	Duke of Burgundy	Succeeded by Henry I, Duke of Burgundy (brother)
