= Henry Melvill Gwatkin =

English theologian and church historian

Henry Melvill Gwatkin (30 July 1844 – 14 November 1916) was an English theologian and church historian.

Gwatkin was born at Barrow-on-Soar, Leicestershire, the youngest son of the Rev. Richard Gwatkin, and educated at Shrewsbury and St John's College, Cambridge. In 1868, he won the university's Scholefield Prize and Hebrew Prize and began his academic career as a Fellow of St John's. In 1891, was appointed as Dixie Professor of Ecclesiastical History in the University of Cambridge, and also transferred as a Fellow to Emmanuel College, serving in those roles until 1912.

Gwatkin died in 1916 and is buried in the Parish of the Ascension Burial Ground, Cambridge, with his wife Lucy de Lisle Gwatkin.

== Works ==
- Studies of Arianism, Chiefly Referring to the Character and Chronology of the Reaction Which Followed the Council of Nicaea (1882; second edition 1900)
- The Arian Controversy (1889)
- The Meaning of Ecclesiastical History (1891) Inaugural Lecture
- Selections from Early Writers, illustrative of Church history to the time of Constantine (1893; revised 1897)
- The Church Past and Present: a Review of its History (1900) editor
- The Eye for Spiritual Things: and Other Sermons (1906)
- The Knowledge of God and its Historical Development (1906) Gifford Lectures, two volumes: Volume 1 and Volume 2
- Early Church History to A.D. 313 (1909) two volumes: Volume 1 and Volume 2
- The Cambridge Medieval History Volume I: The Christian Roman Empire and the Foundation of the Teutonic Kingdoms (1911) editor with J. P. Whitney
- The Cambridge Medieval History: Volume II: The Rise Of The Saracens And The Foundation Of The Western Empire (1913) editor with J. B. Bury and J. P. Whitney
- Episcopacy I. In Scripture (1914) pamphlet
- The Confirmation Rubric: Whom does it Bind (1914) pamphlet
- Britain's Case Against Germany: A Letter to a Neutral (1917)
- Church and State in England to the Death of Queen Anne (1917)
- The Sacrifice of Thankfulness (1917) Sermons, edited by L. de L. Gwatkin

Gwatkin also wrote a few malacological studies, including:

- Gwatkin H. M., Suter H. & Pilsbry H. A. 1895. Observations on the dentition on Achatinellidae. Proceedings of the Academy of Natural Sciences of Philadelphia, volume 47, 237-240.
