= Richerus =

French monk and historian

Richerus or Richer of Reims (fl. 10th century) was a monk of Saint-Remi, just outside Reims, and a historian, an important source for the contemporary kingdom of France.

== Life ==
He was a son of Rodulf, a trusted councillor and captain of Louis IV of France (r. 936–954). He studied at Reims under Gerbert, afterwards Pope Silvester II, who taught him mathematics, history, letters and eloquence. He was also well versed in the medical science of his time, and in 991 travelled to Chartres to consult the medical manuscripts there. He was still living in 998, but there is no mention of him after that date.

== Historiae ==
Historia
- "The History"
- Full title: Historia congressus Gallorum
- Also known as: "History of the conflicts of the Gauls"
- Author(s): Richer of Reims
- Dedicated to: Gerbert d'Aurillac, Archbishop of Reims
- Language: medieval Latin
- Date: c. 995/6
- Manuscript(s): Bamberg State Library, Msc.Hist.5 (Richer's autograph)
- Genre: history
- Subject: West-Frankish kingdom
- Period covered: AD 888—995, Charles the Fat to Hugh Capet
- Sources: include annals by Flodoard and a history of the church of Reims

In the 19th century, it was thought by both French and German scholars that Richerus was an ardent supporter of the Carolingians and French supremacy, as opposed to the Ottonians, but this view has since been tempered somewhat. Whatever one makes of Richer's political biases, inaccuracies and his taste for stylistic embellishment, his Historiae has a unique value as giving us the only tolerably full account by a contemporary of the memorable revolution of 987, which placed the Capets on the throne of France.

The Historiae, in four books, spans the period from 888 to 995. It begins with Charles the Fat and Eudes, and goes down to the year 995. For the first two books, Richerus made extensive use of the annals and church history written by Flodoard (d. 966). From 969 onwards Richerus had no earlier history before him, and his work is the chief source for the period.

The history survives in a single manuscript (Bamberg State Library, Msc.Hist.5), discovered in the early part of the nineteenth century. It was the author's autograph and showed signs of continuous revision, probably until his death.

== Bibliography ==
=== Editions and translations ===
- Lake, Justin (ed. and tr.) Richer of Saint-Rémi. Histories. Dumbarton Oaks Medieval Library, HUP. 2 vols. 2011. Facing-page English translation.
- Hoffmann, Hartmut (ed.). Richer von Saint-Remi. Historiae. MGH Scriptores 38. Hanover, 2000.
- Latouche, Robert (ed. and tr.). Histoire de France (888-995). 2 vols: vol 2 (AD 954-995). Les classiques de l'histoire de France au moyen age 17. Paris: Belles Lettres, 1964.
- Pertz, Georg Heinrich (ed.). MGH Scriptores 3. 561–657. First printed as Richeri historiarum libri IIII. Hanover, 1839. Superseded by Hoffmann's edition.
- Osten-Sacken, Karl Freiherr von (tr.). Richers vier Bücher Geschichte. Die Geschichtsschreiber der deutschen Vorzeit 2. vol 10. Leipzig, 1891. German translation available from Google-USA
- Poinsignon, A.M. (tr.). Richeri historiarum quatuor libri. Reims: Pub. de l'Academie de Rheims, 1855. French translation available from Gallica.
- Guadet, J. (tr.). Histoire de son temps. Societé de l'histoire de France. 2 vols. Paris, 1845. French translation available from Gallica and from Google Books: vol 1 and vol 2.

=== Secondary literature ===
- Bur, M. "Richer von Reims." In: Lexikon des Mittelalters 7. 830 ff.
- Glenn, Jason. Politics and History in the Tenth Century: The Work and World of Richer of Reims. Cambridge: Cambridge University Press, 2004. See CUP for information
- Kortüm, Hans-Henning. Richer von Saint-Remi: Studien zu einem Geschichtsschreiber des 10. Jahrhunderts. Stuttgart, 1985.
- Molinier, A. Les sources de l'histoire de France des origines aux guerres d'Italie. Vol 1. 1901. 284 ff.

==== External links ====
- Works by or about Richerus at the Internet Archive
- Opera Omnia by Migne Patrologia Latina with analytical indexes
- Medieval Sourcebook: Richer of Rheims. Journey to Chartres (tr. M. Markowski)
