= Hugh the Great =

Duke of the Franks and Count of Paris (c. 898–956)

- Duke of the Franks
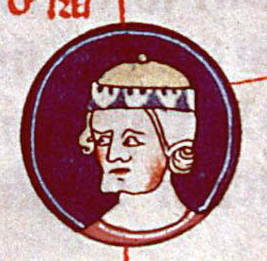
- Hugh as depicted in a 14th century family tree of the Robertians

Count of Paris
- Reign: 923–956
- Predecessor: Robert I of France
- Successor: Hugh Capet
- Born: c. 898; Paris
- Died: 16 June 956 (aged c. 57/58); Dourdan
- Burial: Basilica of Saint-Denis
- Spouse: Judith; Eadhild; Hedwig of Saxony
- Issue: Beatrice of France; Hugh Capet; Emma of Paris, Duchess of Normandy; Otto, Duke of Burgundy; Henry I, Duke of Burgundy
- House: Robertians
- Father: Robert I of France
- Mother: Beatrice of Vermandois

Hugh the Great (c. 898 – 16 June 956) was the duke of the Franks and count of Paris. He was the most powerful magnate in France. Son of King Robert I of France and Beatrice of Vermandois, Hugh was Margrave of Neustria. He played an active role in bringing King Louis IV of France back from England in 936. Seeking an alliance with the Holy Roman Emperor Otto the Great, he married Otto's younger sister Hedwig of Saxony in 937. They were the parents of Hugh Capet. Hedwig's sister, Gerberga of Saxony, was Louis' wife. Although he often fought against Louis, he supported the accession of Louis and Gerberga's son, Lothair of France.

== Biography ==
Hugh was the son of King Robert I of France and Béatrice of Vermandois, a descendant of Charlemagne. He was born in Paris, Île-de-France, France. His eldest son was Hugh Capet who became King of France in 987. His family is known as the Robertians.

In 922, the barons of Western Francia, after revolting against the Carolingian King Charles the Simple (who fled his kingdom under their onslaught), elected Robert I, Hugh's father, as king of Western Francia. At the death of Robert I, in battle at Soissons in 923, Hugh refused the crown and it went to his brother-in-law Rudolph. Charles sought help in regaining his crown from Hugh's cousin Count Herbert II of Vermandois, who instead of helping the king imprisoned him. Herbert then used his prisoner as an advantage in pressing his own ambitions, using the threat of releasing the king up until Charles' death in 929. From then on Herbert II of Vermandois struggled with King Rudolph and Duke Hugh. Finally Rudolph and Herbert II came to an agreement in 935.

At the death of Rudolph in 936, Hugh was in possession of nearly all of the region between the Loire and the Seine, corresponding to the ancient Neustria, with the exceptions of Anjou and of the territory ceded to the Normans in 911. He took a very active part in bringing King Louis IV (d'Outremer) from the Kingdom of England in 936. Historians have wondered why the powerful Hugh the Great called the young Louis to throne instead of taking it himself, as his father had done fifteen years earlier. In the first place, he had many rivals, especially Hugh, Duke of Burgundy (King Rudolph's brother), and Herbert II, Count of Vermandois, who probably would have challenged his election. But above all, it seems that he was shocked by the early death of his father. Richerus explains that Hugh the Great remembered his father who had died for his "pretentions" and this was the cause of his short and turbulent reign.

In 937, Hugh's second wife, Eadhild, died. Later that year, he married Hedwige of Saxony, a daughter of King Henry the Fowler of Germany and Matilda. Soon after this, his third marriage, he was drawn into a prolonged quarrel with Louis IV. In 938, King Louis IV began attacking fortresses and lands formerly held by members of his family, some held by Herbert II of Vermandois. In 939, King Louis attacked Hugh the Great and Duke William Longsword of Normandy, after which a truce was concluded, lasting until June. That same year, Hugh, along with Count Herbert II of Vermandois, Count Arnulf I of Flanders and Duke William Longsword paid homage to the Emperor Otto the Great, and supported him in his struggle against Louis.

When Louis fell into the hands of the Normans in 945, he was handed over to Hugh in exchange for their young duke Richard. Hugh released Louis IV in 946 on condition that he should surrender the fortress of Laon. In 948 at a church council at Ingelheim the bishops, all but two being from Germany, condemned and excommunicated Hugh in absentia, and returned Archbishop Artauld to his See at Reims. Hugh's response was to attack Soissons and Reims while the excommunication was repeated by a council at Trier. In 953 Hugh finally relented and made peace with Louis IV, the church and his brother-in-law Otto the Great.

On the death of Louis IV, Hugh was one of the first to recognize Lothair as his successor, and, at the intervention of Lothair's mother, Gerberga of Saxony, was instrumental in having him crowned. In recognition of this service Hugh was invested by the new king with the duchies of Burgundy and Aquitaine. In the same year, however, Duke Gilbert of Burgundy acknowledged himself his vassal and betrothed his daughter to Hugh's son Otto-Henry. At Giselbert's death on 8 April 956, Hugh became effective master of the duchy; Hugh died in Dourdan on 16 June.

== Family ==
Hugh married first, in 922, Judith, daughter of Roger, Count of Maine, and Rothilde, daughter of Emperor Charles the Bald. She died childless in 925. Hugh's second wife was Eadhild, daughter of Edward the Elder, king of the Anglo-Saxons, and half-sister of King Æthelstan. They married in 926 and she died childless in 937. Hugh's married his third wife, Hedwig of Saxony, daughter of Henry the Fowler and Matilda, in 937. She and Hugh had:

- Beatrice married Frederick I, Duke of Upper Lorraine.
- Hugh Capet (c. 941–996)
- Emma (c. 943 – after 968).
- Otto, Duke of Burgundy, a minor in 956.
- Odo-Henry (Henry I, Duke of Burgundy) (946–1002)
