= Dietrich I of Metz =

Dietrich of Metz (died 18 July 984) was Bishop of Metz from 964 until his death.

He succeeded Adalbero I (929–962) as bishop of Metz. He founded the abbey of St Vincent, Metz.

He crowned Charles, Duke of Lower Lorraine as King of France in Laon in 978; Charles, unsuccessful in gaining recognition subsequently, was supported by Otto II, Holy Roman Emperor (a Saxon like Dietrich, and a relation). Bruno I, Archbishop of Cologne was another cousin, and a friend.

Sigebert of Gembloux and Alpert of Metz wrote biographies of him.
