= Capitulary of Quierzy =

Edict passed by Emperor Charles II in 877

The Capitulary of Quierzy (pronounced [kjɛʁzi]) was a capitulary of Emperor Charles II that had a series of measures to safeguard the administration of his realm during his second Italian expedition, as well as directions for his son Louis the Stammerer, who was entrusted with the government during his father's absence. It has traditionally been seen as the basis on which the major vassals of the kingdom of France such as the counts of Flanders, were enabled to become more independent.

It was promulgated on 14 June 877 at Quierzy-sur-Oise in France (département of Aisne), the site of a Carolingian royal palace, before a great concourse of clergy and nobles. Among the participants were Hincmar, Archbishop of Reims; Gauzlin, Bishop of Paris; and Reginar, Duke of Lorraine. In the document, Charles took elaborate precautions against Louis, whom he apparently deeply distrusted. He forbade him to stay in certain palaces and particularly forests and compelled him to swear not to despoil his stepmother, Richilde, of her allodial lands and benefices. Charles also refused to allow Louis to nominate to the countships that were left vacant in the emperor's absence. In principle, the honores (benefices) and the office of a deceased count had to be given to his son, who would be placed provisionally in possession by Louis. The definitive investiture, however, could be conferred only by Charles.

The capitulary thus served as a guarantee to the aristocracy that the general usage would be followed and was also a means of reassuring the counts who had accompanied the emperor into Italy as to the fate of their benefices. It cannot, however, be regarded as introducing a new principle, and the old opinion that the capitulary was a legislative text to establish the hereditary system of fiefs has been proved to be untenable.

An earlier capitulary of Charles the Bald was promulgated at Quierzy on 14 February 857 and aimed especially at the repression of brigandage.

== See also ==
- Capitularies of Charles the Bald
- Treaty of Coulaines
