= Roger, Count of Maine =

- Count of Maine
- Reign: 886 – 893; 895 – 900
- Died: circa 900
- Spouse: Rothild
- Issue: Hugh I, Count of Maine

Roger of Maine, who died circa 900, was Count of Maine from 886 to 893, and again from 895 to 900. He is the founder of the second house of Maine, sometimes called the "Hugonids".

His family is not identified in contemporary documents. Recent research has proposed several hypotheses. On onomastic considerations, he might be a descendant of the Roger, Count of Le Mans in the early 8th century, and hence possibly of Robertian blood. Were this the case, he would have come from the same stock as his Rorgonid rivals, with whom he disputed the county of Maine. Christian Settipani identifies him with a count Roger who intervened in 892 to the aid of his "uncle" Hughes, count of Bourges, and suggests that this Hughes was his maternal uncle. This presence of names Hugh and Roger is reminiscent of the counts of Laon, and he could be the brother of Hugh, Count of Bassigny and uncle Roger I, Count of Laon.

Roger was married to Rothilde, daughter of the French king Charles the Bald, and was thus close to the royal family. In 885, Ragenold, Margrave of Neustria and Count of Maine was killed by the Normans. The surviving Rorgonids were teenagers, and King Charles the Fat preferred to entrust the march of Neustria to one of his followers, Henry of Franconia, and the county of Maine to Roger. As a consequence, the Rorgonids allied themselves with the Robertians and, after Odo became king of France, Roger was driven out of Le Mans in 893 and replaced by the Rorgonid Gauzlin II. Roger was restored as count in 895, but was particularly violent towards his subjects and the Church, drawing complaint from the Bishop of Le Mans. He died shortly afterwards.

Roger married Rothild, daughter of Charles the Bald and Richilde of Provence. They had:

- Hugh I, Count of Maine
- a daughter, Judith, married about 917 to Hugh the Great, (Note: Barton states an unnamed daughter of Roger of Maine married Hugh the Great before 917.) Duke of the Franks
- perhaps a daughter named Rothildis, who was abbess at Bouxières-aux-Dames from 937 to 965

== Sources ==
- Barton, Richard Ewing (2004). Lordship in the County of Maine, C. 890-1160. The Boydell Press.
- Flodoard of Reims (2004). Bachrach, Bernard S.; Fanning, Steven (eds.). The Annals of Flodoard of Reims, 919-966. University of Toronto Press.
- Riché, Pierre (1993). The Carolingians: A Family Who Forged Europe. Translated by Allen, Michael Idomir. University of Pennsylvania Press.
- Christian Settipani, La Préhistoire des Capétiens (Nouvelle histoire généalogique de l'auguste maison de France, vol. 1), Villeneuve d'Ascq, ed. Patrick van Kerrebrouck, 1993, 545 p. (ISBN 978-2-95015-093-6)
