= 876 =

Calendar year

876 in various calendars
- Gregorian calendar: 876; DCCCLXXVI
- Ab urbe condita: 1629
- Armenian calendar: 325; ԹՎ ՅԻԵ
- Assyrian calendar: 5626
- Balinese saka calendar: 797–798
- Bengali calendar: 282–283
- Berber calendar: 1826
- Buddhist calendar: 1420
- Burmese calendar: 238
- Byzantine calendar: 6384–6385
- Chinese calendar: 乙未年 (Wood Goat); 3573 or 3366 — to — 丙申年 (Fire Monkey); 3574 or 3367
- Coptic calendar: 592–593
- Discordian calendar: 2042
- Ethiopian calendar: 868–869
- Hebrew calendar: 4636–4637
- Hindu calendars
- Vikram Samvat: 932–933
- Shaka Samvat: 797–798
- Kali Yuga: 3976–3977
- Holocene calendar: 10876
- Iranian calendar: 254–255
- Islamic calendar: 262–263
- Japanese calendar: Jōgan 18 (貞観１８年)
- Javanese calendar: 774–775
- Julian calendar: 876; DCCCLXXVI
- Korean calendar: 3209
- Minguo calendar: 1036 before ROC 民前1036年
- Nanakshahi calendar: −592
- Seleucid era: 1187/1188 AG
- Thai solar calendar: 1418–1419
- Tibetan calendar: ཤིང་མོ་ལུག་ལོ་ (female Wood-Sheep); 1002 or 621 or −151 — to — མེ་ཕོ་སྤྲེ་ལོ་ (male Fire-Monkey); 1003 or 622 or −150

Year 876 (DCCCLXXVI) was a leap year starting on Sunday of the Julian calendar.

== Events ==
=== By place ===
==== Byzantine Empire ====
- At the invitation of Benevento, the newly-restored Byzantine fleet appears in the waters off Otranto. On the orders of Emperor Basil I, the Byzantines sail up the Adriatic Sea and reconquer part of southern Italy. The city of Bari is occupied in the name of the Byzantine Empire. Instead of holding it for his 'ally' Adelchis of Benevento, Basil makes it the capital of the new Byzantine Theme of Longobardia.

==== Europe ====
- August 28 – King Louis the German dies at Frankfurt, while preparing for war against his brother Charles II ("the Bald"), ruler of the Holy Roman Empire. The East Frankish Kingdom is divided among his three sons: Carloman receives Bavaria and styles himself "King of Bavaria". Louis the Younger receives Saxony (with Franconia and Thuringia), and Charles the Fat receives Swabia (with Raetia).
- October 8 – Battle of Andernach: Frankish forces, led by Louis the Younger, prevent a West Frankish invasion and defeat Charles II at Andernach. The Rhineland remains part of the East Frankish Kingdom.

==== Britain ====
- The Great Heathen Army, led by Guthrum, captures the fortress of Wareham (Dorset), and is met by a Viking army (3,500 men) from the sea, which lands at Poole Harbour. King Alfred the Great traps the Vikings, and demands hostages in return for a peace agreement. The Danes divide their forces; half flees to Exeter, where they besiege the town while the other half escape in their ships, but are lost in a storm near Swanage.
- Viking leader Halfdan Ragnarsson formally establishes the Danish kingdom of York, after the removal of the puppet king Ricsige of Northumbria, and becomes the first monarch.

==== Arabian Empire ====
- April 8 – Battle of Dayr al-'Aqul: Abbasid forces, led by Al-Muwaffaq, halt a Saffarid invasion on the River Tigris. Emir Ya'qub ibn al-Layth tries to capture the Abbasid Caliphate's capital of Baghdad, but he is forced, with his army, to retreat.

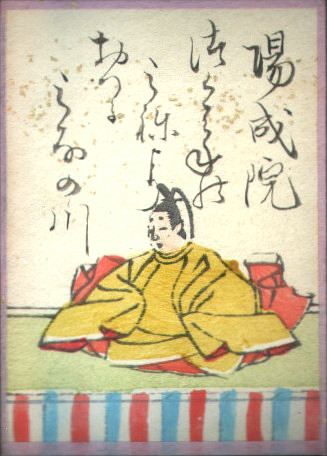
Emperor Yōzei (869–949)

==== Japan ====
- Emperor Seiwa abdicates the throne, in favor of his 7-year-old son Yōzei. Seiwa becomes a Buddhist priest; he appoints Fujiwara no Mototsune as regent (sesshō), who assists the child emperor.

=== By topic ===
==== Religion ====
- June – Synod of Ponthion: Charles II summons a council, in which a papal brief is read from Pope John VIII. He appoints Ansegisus as papal legate and primate over Gaul, in the West Frankish Kingdom.
- John VIII travels throughout Campania, in an effort to form an alliance among the southern Italian states (the cities of Salerno, Capua, Naples, Gaeta and Amalfi) against Muslim raids.

== Births ==
- Eutychius, patriarch of Alexandria (d. 940)
- Henry the Fowler, king of Germany (d. 936)
- John of Rila, Bulgarian hermit (approximate date)
- Lu Wenji, Chinese chancellor (d. 951)
- Toda, queen of Pamplona (d. 958)

== Deaths ==
- January 31 – Hemma of Altdorf, Frankish queen
- August 28 – Louis the German, king of the East Frankish Kingdom
- Bagrat I, prince of Iberia (Georgia)
- Bodo, Frankish deacon
- Conrad I, Frankish nobleman
- Conrad II, Frankish nobleman
- Domagoj, duke (knyaz) of Croatia
- Donatus of Fiesole, Irish bishop
- Gurvand, duke ('king') of Brittany
- Heiric of Auxerre, Frankish theologian and writer (b. 841)
- Hessel Hermana, Frisian governor (approximate date)
- Pascweten, duke ('king') of Brittany
- Pyinbya, king of Burma (b. 817)
- Raganar, Frankish nobleman
- Wulfad, Frankish archbishop
