= Engelram, Chamberlain of France =

- Born: 810
- Died: ca. 880 or 877
- Occupation: Count

Engelram (also, Enguerand, Enguerrand, Engilram, Ingelram, Latin Engilramnus, Ingelramnus) (ca. 810 - 877) was Chamberlain to Charles the Bald through sometime after 871. He also held the title of count from 853, but it is unclear what his domain was. Nothing is known about his ancestry.

Engleram was Chamberlain, Master of the Doorkeepers and Administrator of the fisc under Charles. He held this post from 842 until 871 or 872 when he was replaced by Boso of Provence. He was identified as a leading figure of Charles’ network of loyal counts, including Nibelung II, Count of the Vexin, and Aleran, Count of Troyes, that assisted in the management of the kingdom.

Engelram is indicated as being count somewhere in the third missicatum in the Capitulary of Servais of November 853 which included “the counties of Engelram.” Nelson identifies Engelram as a count “whose county lay in the northeast of the realm, near that of Charles’s son-in-law, Count Baldwin.” Grierson has assessed that the pagi (districts) of Mélantois, Caribant, Pevèle, and Ostrevant were those of Engelram referred to in the capitulary. Claims that Engelram was the count of Flanders are clearly false (as is the assertion that he was the grandfather of Baldwin I). Engelram was lay abbot of St. Peter's Abbey in Ghent, which could also have been the source of his title.

When Charles made a pact with his half-brother Louis the German in 864, he was named, along with Hincmar of Reims, as a guarantor on the behalf of the king. He was Charles's representative at the Synod of Meaux in June 845. In 868, he was sent with gifts to King Salomon of Brittany, and he acted as a guarantor again in 870, as reported in the capitulary of a meeting of Charles and Louis on 6 March 870.

Richilde of Provence, Charles’ second wife, was hostile towards Engelram and she had him replaced as chamberlain by her brother Boso of Provence. A disgraced Engelram persuaded Louis to invade Lorraine following the death of Emperor Louis II the Younger, reaching the palace of Attigny on 25 December 875, before retreating back to Mayence.

Engelram married Friderada, a Liudolfing, and had one daughter, name unknown, who married Ricwin, Count of Verdun. She was the mother of Ricwin's successor, Otto, who also served as Duke of Lorraine. Ricwin ordered the beheading of his wife for her unchastity.

== Sources ==
- Nelson, Janet Laughland, Charles the Bald, Longman Press, 1992
- The Annals of St.-Bertin, Translated and Annotated by Janet L. Nelson, Manchester University Press, 1991
- The Annals of Fulda, Translated and Annotated by Timothy Reuter, Manchester University Press, 1992
- Germany and the Western Empire, Volume III of the Cambridge Medieval History, University of Cambridge, 1922
- Grierson, Philip, "The early abbots of St. Peters of Ghent", Revue Bénédictine 48 (1936): 129-145.
