= Friderada =

Friderada was a ninth-century noblewoman about whom very little is known. She was probably related to Liudolf, Duke of Saxony. Friderada married at least three times and was the grandmother of Otto, Duke of Lorraine.

Her first husband was Engelram, Chamberlain to Charles the Bald (d. 877). That union produced a daughter, whose name is not known. This daughter married Ricwin, Count of Verdun, as his first wife. Their only child was Otto, Count of Verdun and Duke of Lorraine.

Widowed, Friderada married Bernarius, Count of Charpeigne, about whom nothing further is known. Bernarius was murdered in 883 by Hugh, Duke of Alsace, son of Lothair II, King of Lotharingia, and his concubine Waldrada, and Friderada married her husband's murderer. No children are recorded.

Friderada's grandson Otto, Duke of Lorraine, is identified as the son of a Count Ricwin and a Liudolfing, and a relative of Otto I, Holy Roman Emperor. Chronologically, Friderada could possibly have been a daughter or granddaughter of Liudolf, but no concrete evidence of this exists.

Friderada had two husbands between Engelram and Hugh: Bernarius, and Wipert of Nantes, son of Lambert III of Nantes and Rotrude of Italy, daughter of Lothair I, Holy Roman Emperor. Wipert had one son, also named Wipert (880-900), but it is not clear that Friderada was the mother. Both Bernarius and Wipert were reportedly executed in 883 by Hugh in order to marry the widow, so it is unlikely that they were both Friderada’s husbands. Note that Hugh and Wipert were first cousins.

An alternative narrative is provided by Jackman. In this analysis, Bernarius was married to a sister of Wipert. Wipert was the guardian of Hugh, and married to Friderada. Bernarius and Wipert were allies of Hugh, but turned against him once his aspirations towards royal succession surfaced, and so Hugh murdered them both and married the widow Friderada.

== Sources ==
- Jackman, Donald C., Ius hereditarium Encountered I: The Meingaud-Walaho Inheritance, Editions Enlaplage, Oct 25, 2010
