= Rothild =

Rothild, Ruothild or Hruothild (French: Rothilde; Latin: Rothildis, Rotildis, Ruothildis) is a feminine given name of Germanic origin. It may refer to:

- Hruothild (born c. 791), granddaughter of Hessi and abbess of Karsbach
- Ruothild (daughter of Charlemagne) (died 852), abbess of Faremoutiers
- Rothild, wife of Adalbert I, Margrave of Tuscany (r. 847–886)
- Rothild (daughter of Charles the Bald) (died 928/929), abbess of Chelles
- Rothild (abbess of Bouxières) (fl. 937–966)
- Ruothild (abbess of Pfalzel) (fl. 980s–990s)
