= Capitularies of Charles the Bald =

Series of acts implemented by King Charles

The Capitularies of Charles the Bald represent a series of acts implemented by King Charles to decide and promulgate laws governing public affairs. Capitularies were used extensively by the Merovingian and Carolingian rulers (see the Capitularies of Charlemagne) to provide guidance to counts and their subordinate officers in the far-flung reaches of the empire.

Hincmar, as chief advisor to Charles, was particularly adept at coordinating and disseminating the capitularies, soliciting maximum input from all sources. While numerous capitularies were issued by Charles, two important ones stand out:

- Capitulary of Servais of 854, dispatching Missi to protect and secure the realm
- Capitulary of Quierzy of 877, providing guidance for protecting the realm during Charles’ absence.

A complete list of capitularies was provided by Jacques Sirmond in his 1623 history.

== See also ==
- Treaty of Coulaines

== Sources ==
- Nelson, Janet Laughland, Charles the Bald, Longman Press, 1992
- Herlihy, David (Editor), The History of Feudalism, Springer, 1971 (available on Google Books)
- Jacques Sirmond, Karoli Calvi et successorum aliquot Franciae regum capitula, 1623
- Capitulary, The Encyclopædia Britannica, 11th Edition, Cambridge, 1911
