= Hubert Mordek =

German historian

Hubert Mordek (8 May 1939, Namslau - 17 March 2006, Karlsbad-Langensteinbach) was a German historian.

== Biography ==
Mordek studied history, Latin, and philosophy at the University of Kiel, the University of Würzburg, and the University of Tübingen. He received his doctorate in 1969 with Die Rechtssammlungen der Handschrift von Bonnveal - ein Werk der karolingischen Reform, directed by Horst Fuhrmann. In the early 1970s he was an assistant at the German Historical Institute in Rome. His habilitation followed in 1975, with Kirchenrecht und Reform in Frankenreich. Die Collectio Vetus Gallica, die älteste systematische Kanonessammlung des fränkischen Gallien. Studien und Edition, which was praised as "arguably the most significant contribution to the study of canonical collections in the past half century." From 1978 until his emeritate he taught at the University of Freiburg.

His main areas of research were the ecclesiastical and legal history of the Middle Ages, canon law. He was an editor for the Monumenta Germaniae Historica of Carolingian texts and capitularies. He died before he could finish his last project, an edition of the Admonitio generalis, which was finally published in 2012 (with Klaus Zechiel-Eckes and Michael Glatthaar).

== Select publications ==
Monographs

- Studien zur fränkischen Herrschergesetzgebung. Aufsätze über Kapitularien und Kapitulariensammlungen ausgewählt zum 60. Geburtstag, Frankfurt am Main 2000, ISBN 3-631-37660-X.
- Kirchenrecht und Reform in Frankenreich. Die Collectio Vetus Gallica, die älteste systematische Kanonessammlung des fränkischen Gallien. Studien und Edition, Berlin 1975, ISBN 3-11-001826-8.

Edited collections

- Aus Archiven und Bibliotheken. Festschrift für Raymund Kottje zum 65. Geburtstag, Frankfurt am Main 1992, ISBN 3-631-44363-3.
- Papsttum, Kirche und Recht im Mittelalter. Festschrift für Horst Fuhrmann zum 65. Geburtstag, Tübingen 1991, ISBN 3-484-80142-5.

== Bibliography ==
- Horst Fuhrmann: "Nachruf auf Hubert Mordek." Deutsches Archiv für Erforschung des Mittelalters 62, 2006, pp. 877–879.
- Oliver Münsch and Thomas Zotz, eds.: Scientia veritatis. Festschrift für Hubert Mordek zum 65. Geburtstag, Ostfildern 2004, ISBN 3-7995-7081-0.
- Thomas Martin Buck, ed.: Quellen, Kritik, Interpretation. Festgabe zum 60. Geburtstag von Hubert Mordek, Frankfurt am Main 1999, ISBN 3-631-34883-5.
