= Michael Glatthaar =

German scholar

- Born: 3 May 1953 (age 72); Tettnang, West Germany

Michael Glatthaar (born 3 May 1953) is a German scholar of the Middle Ages, specializing in the documents of the Carolingians and the study of Saint Boniface. A student of Hubert Mordek, he is the author of Bonifatius und das Sakrileg (2004), a study of the saint's influence on the concept of sacrilege in the 8th-century church and afterward. In his study he identifies a number of sententiae in a Wurzburg manuscript (an important witness for the Collectio canonum Hibernensis) as connected to Boniface, proposing the title Sententiae Bonifantianae Wirceburgensis for the fifty-four capitula and chapter headings in the manuscript. He has argued for the authenticity of the 716 capitulary of Pope Gregory II which invested three papal legates with the organization of the church in Bavaria, and for its close connection to Boniface's sphere of influence.

With Hubert Mordek and Klaus Zechiel-Eckes he is the editor of the Admonitio generalis, an important Carolingian document.

== Select publications ==
- Mordek, Hubert; Zechiel-Eckes, Klaus; Glatthaar, Michael, eds. (2012). Die Admonitio generalis Karls des Großen (in German). Hannover: Hahnsche Buchhandlung. ISBN 978-3-7752-2201-3.
- Glatthaar, Michael (2010). "Zur Datierung der Epistola generalis Karls des Großen". Deutsches Archiv für Erforschung des Mittelalters (in German). 66 (2): 455–478. ISSN 0012-1223.
- Glatthaar, Michael (2004). "Gregor II. und Karl Martell im Jahr 729". In Münsch, Oliver; Zotz, Thomas L. (eds.). Scientia veritatis: Festschrift für Hubert Mordek zum 65. Geburtstag (in German). Ostfildern. ISBN 978-3-7995-7081-7. OCLC 56198378.
- Glatthaar, Michael (1999). "Rätisches Recht des 8. Jahrhunderts in der Predigt 'De signum Christi'". In Buck, Thomas Martin; Herrmann, Julia (eds.). Quellen, Kritik, Interpretation: Festgabe zum 60. Geburtstag von Hubert Mordek (in German). Lang. ISBN 978-3-631-34883-3.
- Mordek, Hubert; Glatthaar, Michael (June 1993). "Von Wahrsagerinnen und Zauberern: Ein Beitrag zur Religionspolitik Karls des Großen". Archiv für Kulturgeschichte (in German). 75 (1): 33–64. doi:10.7788/akg.1993.75.1.33. ISSN 0003-9233.
