= Abbo Cernuus =

Neustrian Benedictine monk and poet based in Paris (c.850-c.923)

- Born: c. 850 – c. 923
- Occupations: Monk and Poet

Abbo Cernuus ("the Crooked"), Abbo Parisiensis, or Abbo of Saint-Germain (c. 850 – c. 923) was a Neustrian Benedictine monk and poet of the Abbey of Saint-Germain-des-Prés in Paris. He was born about the middle of the ninth century.

Abbo was present at the Siege of Paris by the Vikings in 885–886. He was the only eyewitness who wrote a description of it, in Latin verse, with an account of subsequent events to 896, the so-called De bellis Parisiacæ urbis or Bella Parisiacæ urbis ("Wars of the City of Paris"). Abbo also left some sermons for the instruction of clerics in Paris and Poitiers (Patrologia Latina, CXXXII).

== Life ==
Though coming from one of the most prominent ecclesiastical centres of ninth-century Francia, the monk Abbo is unusually obscure for an individual responsible for a source such as the De bellis. The little that is known about him is gleaned from this work, with very little corroboratory evidence from elsewhere. Though he was a Neustrian, there is no information regarding his political agenda or affiliations, as he contradicts his own "views" throughout the work. As a result, historians have often speculated that the De bellis was "refined" at a later date by a separate editor.

Abbo can be viewed as a source for the collapse of Carolingian hegemony in 887–88. He regarded Odo as the legitimate successor of Charles the Fat in West Francia after Charles' death (888) and does not seem to have regarded the deposition of East Francia as binding on West Francia. Abbo also regards the empire as Frankish and he himself, though a Neustrian and Parisian, as Frankish as well. He does not present a united West Francia as a more basic political unit than the empire and is therefore seen by some historians as refuting the hypothesis that regional identities led to the break-up of the empire within Abbo's lifetime.

In 921, Abbo published some of his sermons at the insistence of Bishop Fulrad of Paris, who held office from 921 - 927. His publications under Fulrad are the last indications of Abbo in French records, causing ambiguity about the year of his death. His death has no definitive date, though it has been assumed to be sometime after 922, given his relationship with Fulrad.

== De bellis Parisiacæ urbis ==
The Wars of the City of Paris was written in the 890s. The poem narrates events taking place over an eleven-year period from 885 to 896. It was first composed around 890 and later extended up to 896. The entire poem consists of 1,393 lines in three books: 660 lines in the first book, 618 in the second, and 115 in the third. Throughout the poem Abbo employs a dactylic hexameter, though with the occasional fault. This metre helps to underpin the epic nature of the poem, a conscious aim of Abbo. The purpose of the work was both scholarly and hortative, warning future generations of the Viking menace. Its polemic literary style (sometimes called the "hermeneutic style") is typical of its period and place, though it is studded with "obscure Grecisms." It has usually received negative criticism from historians, or even been viewed as a contemporary parody of the hermeneutic style.

A detailed and political work, it has been underused by historians of the late Carolingians. It may have been written at the request or insistence of Odo of France, who appears as the hero and "future king" (rex futurus) in the poem. The poet views Odo through the lens of the 890s. He praises Odo as "the noblest" of the city of Paris, more so than Askericus or Joscelin. Abbo also presents the Emperor Charles III, whom he refers to as basileus Francorum ("emperor of the Franks"), in a positive light. The poem stresses the magnitude and diversity of the united Frankish empire. Significantly, he places no blame on the emperor for the siege of Paris nor for the subsequent harrying of Burgundy, which he actually considered to be appropriate for the Burgundians' refusal to aid the city. Abbo even warns the Neustrians not to use "the purple to keep warm", a reference to over-reliance on imperial protection, purple being an imperial colour. The term basileus is likewise a distinctly Byzantine term.

Overall the De bellis seems less concerned with historical accuracy than with theology, preferring to ask why Paris was besieged by the Vikings and to speculate on the spiritual battle that "must" have occurred. Since this theme is most prominent in Book III, it has been treated with neglect by historians of the period. Henri Waquet even chose to omit it from his edition of the work entirely.
