= Benedict Levita =

Pseudonym attached to a forged collection of ninth-century capitularies

Benedict Levita (of Mainz), or Benedict the Deacon, is the pseudonym attached to a forged collection of capitularies that appeared in the ninth century.

The collection belongs to the group of pseudo-Isidorian forgeries that includes the false decretals ascribed to Isidorus Mercator, the so-called Capitula Angilramni, and a series of reworked extracts from the Council of Chalcedon.

== Author ==
Benedictus Levita, using what is obviously an assumed name, claims in his prefatory remarks to have been a deacon in the church of Mainz. He says that he assembled his collection from materials he found in the archiepiscopal archives of Mainz, at the command of the late Archbishop Otgar (d. 847). Though earlier scholars were inclined to believe some of these statements, modern authors agree that Benedict's preface is entirely fictional.

Both the subject matter and the sources employed by the forged capitularies show that they were composed in the western part of the Frankish empire, in the archiepiscopal province of Reims, and not at Mainz. It has long been noted, for example, that several of the forged capitula attack the chorepiscopate, and ninth-century opposition to chorbishops was particularly strong in the western Carolingian empire. Benedict’s collection was also first used by bishops in the Reims province, and recent work by Klaus Zechiel-Eckes has shown that its compiler likely used the monastic library available at Corbie (in the diocese of Amiens) to compile at least some of the forged laws.

The date of Benedictus Levita’s capitula has long proved controversial. The prefatory material mentions that Archbishop Otgar of Mainz has died; the preface must thus postdate 847 (Otgar died 21 April, 847). Earlier scholars applied this terminus post quem to the entire complex of Pseudo-Isidorian forgeries, though modern authors are more inclined to see at least some of the forgeries introduced by the preface as an earlier phenomenon, extending back to at least the later 830s.

The relationship between Benedictus Levita and the other Pseudo-Isidorian forgeries has also long been a matter of discussion. By and large, the forged decretals of Pseudo-Isidore appear to postdate Benedictus Levita, and even seem to use some of the forged capitula as a source. This relationship is reversed, however, in the final section of Benedictus Levita, where the capitula appear to use Pseudo-Isidore's false decretals as a source. But the way in which Benedictus Levita uses these decretals shows that the Pseudo-Isidorian collection had not yet reached its completed form.

== Content and inspiration ==
The author represents his collection as the continuation and completion of the collection of genuine capitularies in four books, "Capitularia regum Francorum", produced in 827 by Ansegisus, Abbot of Fontanelle.

He divides it into three books which he designates as "liber quintus", "sextus", and "septimus". Three other writings precede the first book; a prologue in verse, a preface in prose which treats of the origin and contents of the collection, and the aforesaid metrical panegyric on the rulers of the Carolingian line; beginning with Pepin and Carloman and ending with the sons of Louis the Pious. Four supplementary writings (additamenta) are annexed to the last book; (I) The Aachen capitulary of 817 concerning the monasteries; (II) the report of the bishops (August, 829) to the Emperor Louis the Pious; (III) a few genuine capitularies and a large number of forged ones, just as in the main body of the collection; (IV) a large number (170) of extracts taken from various sources, among which are also forgeries of the Pseudo-Isidore.

The work of Abbot Ansegisus was taken as a model for the collection. As to the sources of the collection, about one-fourth of it consists of genuine capitularies (a certain kind of royal decrees customary in the Frankish Empire); in fact, the genuine materials used by the author surpass sometimes those used by Ansegisus. Most of the pretended capitularies are, however, not genuine.

Among the genuine sources, from which the larger portion of them are drawn, are: the Holy Scriptures; the decrees of councils; papal decrees; the collection of Irish canons; the Pandects of Justinian I; the Codex Theodosianus; the "leges Visigothorum" and "Baiuwariorum"; the Breviary of Alaric; ecclesiastical penitentials; the writings of the Church Fathers, and letters of bishops. He repeats himself frequently; a number of chapters are duplicated literally or nearly word for word.

The chief aim of the forger was to enable the Church to maintain its independence in face of the assaults of the secular power. The author stands for the contemporary movement in favour of ecclesiastical reform, and in opposition to the rule of the Church by the laity.

== Modern editions ==
The first two editions (Jan Tilius, Paris, 1548, and Pierre Pithou, Paris, 1588) are incomplete. The collection is found complete in Étienne Baluze, Capitularia regum Francorum (Paris, 1677), I, col. 801-1232, and in Pertz, Monumenta Germaniae Historica: Leges, II (Hanover, 1837), 2, 39-158 (cf. Jacques Paul Migne, Patrologia Latina, XCVII, col. 699-912). G. Schmitz is preparing a new edition for the Monumenta Germaniae Historica).
