= Hugh I of Maine =

French noble

Hugh I
- Count of Maine
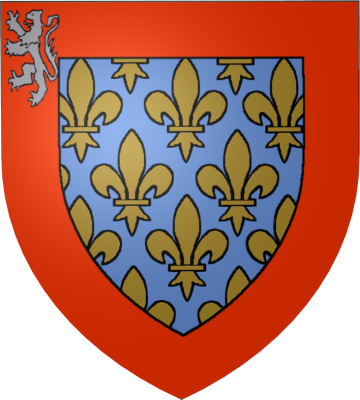
- Coat of arms
- Tenure: c. 900–933
- Predecessor: Roger, Count of Maine
- Successor: Hugh II, Count of Maine
- Died: 933
- Issue: Hugh II, Count of Maine
- Father: Roger, Count of Maine
- Mother: Rothilde

Hugh I was count of Maine (reigned 900–933). He succeeded his father as of Count of Maine c. 900.

== Life ==
He was the son of Roger, Count of Maine, and Rothilde, daughter of Charles the Bald. He succeeded his father c. 900. By a marriage of his sister Judith (Note: Europäische Stammtafeln Band II, Tafel 10 has the first wife of Hugh the Great as Judith.) to Hugh the Great sometime before 917, Hugh became an ally to the Robertians ending a long period of hostility between them. Around 922, King Charles the Simple withdrew the benefit of the Abbey of Chelles from Rotilde, Hughʻs mother and Hugh the Greatʻs mother-in-law, to entrust it to a favorite of his, Hagano. The favoritism shown Hagano caused a great deal of resentment and led, in part, to a revolt against Charles the Simple that placed Robert I of France on the throne. Even after the death of his sister when Hugh the Great married a second time he remained an adherent of the Robertians.

== Family ==
By his wife, name unknown, very probably a Rorgonide, he had:

- Hugh II, Count of Maine (d. bef. 991).
