= Raganar (Frankish count) =

Raganar (Reginar, Reiner) (died 8 October 876), Frankish Count, was a vassal of Charles the Bald and fought in many of Charles' campaigns. The precise counties that Raganar ruled are uncertain but are known to have been south of Thérouanne.

In the Capitulary of Servais, part of District (Missaticum) 4 is identified as "the counties of Reginar". This district, with Thérouanne as its capital and bishopric, stretched south for about 100 km. These counties are the ones which were most certainly under Raganar. Because of the locality of District 4 and the uncertainty of rule in the 9th century, it is likely that these counties included part of Hesbaye.

Raganar participated in Charles' 876 campaign against his nephew Louis the Younger. He was standard-bearer during the Battle of Andernach, where he was killed along with a Count Jerome. Numerous other counts as well as Bishop Gauzlin were captured.

Onomastics would suggest that Raganar was somehow related to Count Meginhere (whose son Reginar was executed in 818 for treason) and Gilbert, Count of the Maasgau, probably father of Reginar I, the founder of the House of Reginar.
