= Ferdinand Güterbock =

Ferdinand Güterbock (8 January 1872, Berlin – 15 April 1944, Engelberg) was a German historian and art collector.

== Life ==
Ferdinand Güterbock was a son of the painter Leopold Güterbock and came from a wealthy family. He married Mina Güterbock-Auer (1885-1970, sister of Grethe Auer) and lived in a villa in Berlin-Steglitz that served as a meeting place for historians. He was friends with Paul Fridolin Kehr, Erich Caspar and Robert Holtzmann, among others.

In 1895 Güterbock completed his doctorate under Paul Scheffer-Boichorst on the Peace of Montebello. He lived as a private scholar and researched in particular on Friedrich Barbarossa as well as the history of Italy and later of Switzerland. In addition, he worked for the Neues Archiv and occasionally completed tasks concerning the Monumenta Germaniae Historica as a freelancer (from about 1900). In this series he published "Das Geschichtswerk des Otto Morena und seiner Fortsetzer" in 1930.

He was married to Wilhelmine Güterbock (née Auer) (May 4, 1885-January 1, 1970). They had two children Eva Marie Weinmann et Johanna Julie Güterbock.

Güterbock also collected art.

Of Jewish origin, Güterbock emigrated to Switzerland in 1937, where he lived in Weggis and was naturalised shortly before his death in 1944.

== Selected works ==
- Der Friede von Montebello und die Weiterentwickelung des Lombardenbundes. Berlin 1895.
- Der Prozeß Heinrichs des Löwen. Kritische Untersuchungen. Berlin 1909.
- Mussolini und der Fascismus. München 1923.
- Engelbergs Gründung und erste Blüte 1120–1223. Neue quellenkritische Forschungen. Zürich 1948.
- als Herausgeber: Das Geschichtswerk des Otto Morena und seiner Fortsetzer über die Taten Friedrichs I. in der Lombardei, MGH, SS rer. Germ. N. S. 7, 1930.

He was also commissioned by the MGH in 1925 to edit the Faventine Chronicle of Tolosanus, but this was not published.
