= Admonitio generalis =

Capitulary issued by Charlemagne in 789

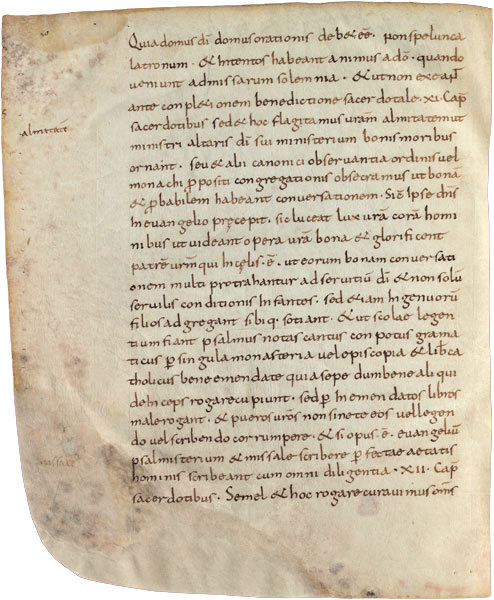
Admontio Generales in a Page

The Admonitio generalis is a collection of legislation known as a capitulary issued by Charlemagne in 789, which covers educational and ecclesiastical reform within the Frankish kingdom. Capitularies were used in the Frankish kingdom during the Carolingian dynasty by government and administration bodies and covered a variety of topics, sorted into chapters. Admonitio generalis is actually just one of many Charlemagne's capitularies that outlined his desire for a well-governed, disciplined Christian Frankish kingdom. The reforms issued in these capitularies by Charlemagne during the late 8th century reflect the cultural revival known as the Carolingian Renaissance.

== Charlemagne and his desire for reform ==
Charlemagne (742–814) ruled from 771 until his death, and the Frankish kingdom experienced a period of stability during his reign. This was arguably because of his strict and efficient moral and judicial reform and governance, enforced with capitularies like Admonitio generalis. Indeed, Admonitio generalis was just one step in Charlemagne's goal of Christian institutions, political structures, and subjects within his Frankish kingdom, and it would be continually adapted and reinforced to meet his objectives. When Charlemagne came to power, he had two goals; territorial expansion and the conversion of all Franks to Christianity, including those recently added to the kingdom. Charlemagne's desire to extend his empire was inseparable from his desire to extend Christianity, so the conquering of other kingdoms was a method often used. This Frankish expansion into other realms and their contrast with those people and their religions, for example the arrival of Islam in Spain, has to be considered when considering legal and religious reforms such as Admonitio generalis and the fever in which they were carried out. Charlemagne was the champion of orthodoxy, and to address his perceived failings of the church and the moral and spiritual health of the Franks, he set out to reform the church and his subjects with the capitulary Admonitio generalis.

== Reforms ==
In the Admonitio generalis, Charlemagne pronounced that he was a "new Josiah", and responsible for the moral health and salvation of his subjects, highlighting Charlemagne's commitment to the Christianization of the Frankish kingdom. He sought to achieve this by reforming the church in pursuit of the moral reform and discipline of the clergy and other ecclesiastical members with the expectation they would lead their followers by example. He also pursued educational reform, requiring monasteries and cathedrals to establish schools to educate boys to read and write in order to make the Bible and other religious texts more accessible and in turn broadening and deepening the spread of Christianity. The schools would also teach religious music, singing and psalms to encourage the spread of the faith, as well as grammar so that religious texts could be revised and edited. To achieve these goals Charlemagne consulted with clerical advisors and rulings from earlier council decisions such as the Dionysio-Hadriana collection of canon law to draw up the 82 chapters of the Admonitio generalis. Chapters addressed the expected behavior, responsibilities, and compliance of all members of society. The clergy and monks were charged with the establishment of schools, guidelines were given regarding the basic knowledge expected of all Christians, and stipulations were made concerning weights and measures. Charlemagne also championed the use of Roman liturgy, and ordained the memorization and use of Roman chants in the Admonitio generalis.

== Distribution and reception ==
Capitularies were sent to missi dominici, or officials supervising the administration of different parts of the Frankish kingdom, for their local enforcement. The missi dominici were to represent and watch out for the king's royal interests, and report back to him. The missi dominici would compile books from parts of different capitularies and other laws and religious texts indicating what was important to them and what they found useful in governing their districts. The wide distribution and acceptance of Admonitio generalis is traceable by the large number of surviving manuscripts from the books of the missi dominici that include parts of Admonitio generalis, found across the entire Frankish kingdom, showing up as early as the late 8th century. The reception and implementation of Admonitio generalis is also tangible by examining the effect it had on the Carolingian Renaissance, with Charlemagne's edicts of moral reform spurring on the resurgence of the education of the arts.

== Role in the Carolingian Renaissance ==
Charlemagne's early capitularies such as Admonitio generalis were the foundation for the Carolingian Renaissance, establishing his religious and educational aspirations for the kingdom. Charlemagne's most significant contribution to the Carolingian Renaissance was the revival of learning, especially among the clergy, most of whom were barely literate. Before the surge of education following the Admonitio generalis and subsequent Carolingian Renaissance, it was difficult for the Frankish people to connect with Christianity and the church. Peasant life was very hard; the people were illiterate and Latin, the language of the church, was not their native language, making Christianity and the Bible difficult to access. Nobles also were largely uneducated and uncultured, with few devoted Christians among them. Only the clergy were consistent in having some level of education, and thus they had the best understanding and exposure to the Bible and the full extent of Christianity. The schools, which the Admonitio ordered established by the monasteries and cathedrals, began a tradition of higher learning in Carolingian Europe, leading the revival known as the Carolingian Renaissance. The fulfillment of Admonitio generalis meant that the study of language, rhetoric and grammar in these institutions, as well as the standardizing of writing scripture and Latin, was undertaken in order to make religious texts and books accessible to the clergy, as well as their correction and standardization. However this strengthened all forms of Carolingian literature, and book production, as well as developments in law, historical writing, and uses of poetry all flourished in these schools. In fact, the capitularies themselves, and the level of language they use, are examples of the increasing importance of writing within the Frankish kingdom. As well as language, the Admonitio generalis ordered other arts such as numbers and arithmetic, ratios, taxes, measure, architecture, geometry, and astrology to be taught, leading to developments in each field and their application within society. Charlemagne pushed for an educated clergy who could help lead reform, because it was his belief that the study of arts would aid them in understanding sacred texts, which they could then pass on to their followers. During the Carolingian Renaissance, Charlemagne unified religious practices and culture within his realm, creating a Christian kingdom, and ultimately unifying his empire.

== Critical Edition ==
- Hubert Mordek, Klaus Zechiel-Eckes, Michael Glatthaar (eds.): Die Admonitio generalis Karls des Großen (= Monumenta Germaniae Historica, Fontes iuris Germanici antiqui in usum scholarum separatim editi. vol. 16). Hahn, Hannover 2012, ISBN 978-3-7752-2201-3. Digital version. [Critical edition, with German translation.]

== See also ==
- Government of the Carolingian Empire
- Carolingian architecture
- Carolingian art
- List of Carolingian monasteries
