= Otto of Lorraine =

Otto of Lorraine may refer to:

- Otto, Duke of Lorraine (died 944), reigned 940–944
- Otto, Duke of Lower Lorraine (c. 970–1012), reigned 991–1012
