= Capitulary of Servais =

The Capitulary of Servais was the implementation of an agreement between Charles the Bald and his half-brother Lothar to maintain the peace. In a conference of Charles and Lothar at Valenciennes in 853, the missi [literally, the sent ones] were re-established after a long hiatus. Lothar recommended that peace and justice be secured by sending out missi to enforce the laws and help keep the peace. The Diet of Servais confirmed the decisions arrived at during the conference. The Capitulary of Servais was enacted by Charles in November 853 dividing the Franco-Burgundian portion of Charles’ realm into twelve districts (missatica) to enforce the measures of this agreement. According to Nelson, the twelve missicati and associated missi were:

- Missaticum 1: Rheims, Voncq, Perthes, Bar-le-Duc, Chanzy, Vertus, Binson, Tardenois
- Missi: Bishop Hincmar [of Rheims], Ricuin, Engilscale
- Missaticum 2: Laon, Porcien, Soissons, Orxois, Valnis
- Missi: Bishop Ethiopia Pardulus [of Laon], Altmar, Theodacrus
- Missaticum 3: Noyon, Vermandois, Arras, Courtrai, Flanders, the counties of Engelram and the counties of Waltcaud
- Missi: Bishop Immo [of Noyon], Abbot Adalard [of St-Bertin], Waltcaud, Oldaric
- Missaticum 4: The counties of Berengar, Engiscalc, Gerard and the counties of Reginar
- Missi: Bishop Folcuin [of Thérouanne], Adalgar, Engiscalc and Berengar
- Missaticum 5: Paris, Meaux, Senlis, Vexin, Beauvais, Vendcuil
- Missi: Abbot Louis [of St-Denis], Bishop Erminfridus [of Beauvais], Ingilwin, Gotselm
- Missaticum 6: Rouen, Talau, Vimeu, Poitnieu, Amiens
- Missi: Bishop Paul [of Rouen], Bishop Hilmerad [of Amiens], Herloin, Hungar
- Missaticum 7: Avranches, Countances, Bayeux, Cotentin, Otlinga Saxonia and Harduin’s [part of that area], Eu, Lisieux
- Missi: Bishop Airard [of Lisieux], Abbot Theuderic [of Jumiéges], Herloin, Harduin
- Missaticum 8: Le Mans, Angers, Tours, Corbonnais, Sées
- Missi: Bishop Dodo [of Angers], Robert and Osbert
- Missaticum 9: Blois, Orléans, Vendôme, Chartres, Dreux, Chateaudun, Evreux, Arpajon, Poissy, Mardie
- Missi: Bishop Bouchard [of Chartres], Rudulf, Abbot Henry
- Missaticum 10: Troyes, Gatinais, Melun, Provins, Arcis-sur-Aube, Brienne
- Missi: Bishop Wenilo [of Sens], Odo [brother of Robert the Strong] and Donatus
- Missaticum 11: Counties of Milo and counties of Isembard, namely Autun, Macon, Chalon, [land of] Chattuarii, Tonnerre, Beaune, Deusme, the county of Attela, and the county of Romold
- Missi: Bishop Theutbald [of Langres], Bishop Jonas [of Autun], Abbot Abbo, and Daddo
- Missicatum 12: Nevers, Auxerre, Avallon
- Missi: Hugh, Gozso (or Cozso), Nibelung.

See also Capitularies of Charles the Bald.

== Sources ==
- Nelson, Janet Laughland, Charles the Bald, Longman Press, 1992
- Thompson, James Westfall, The Decline of the Missi Dominici in Frankish Gaul, University of Chicage Press, 1903
