= Rothild (abbess of Bouxières) =

Rothild (French: Rothilde; Latin: Rothildis or Rotildis) was a Benedictine nun and the first abbess of the Abbey of Bouxières at Bouxières-aux-Dames (fl. 937–966).

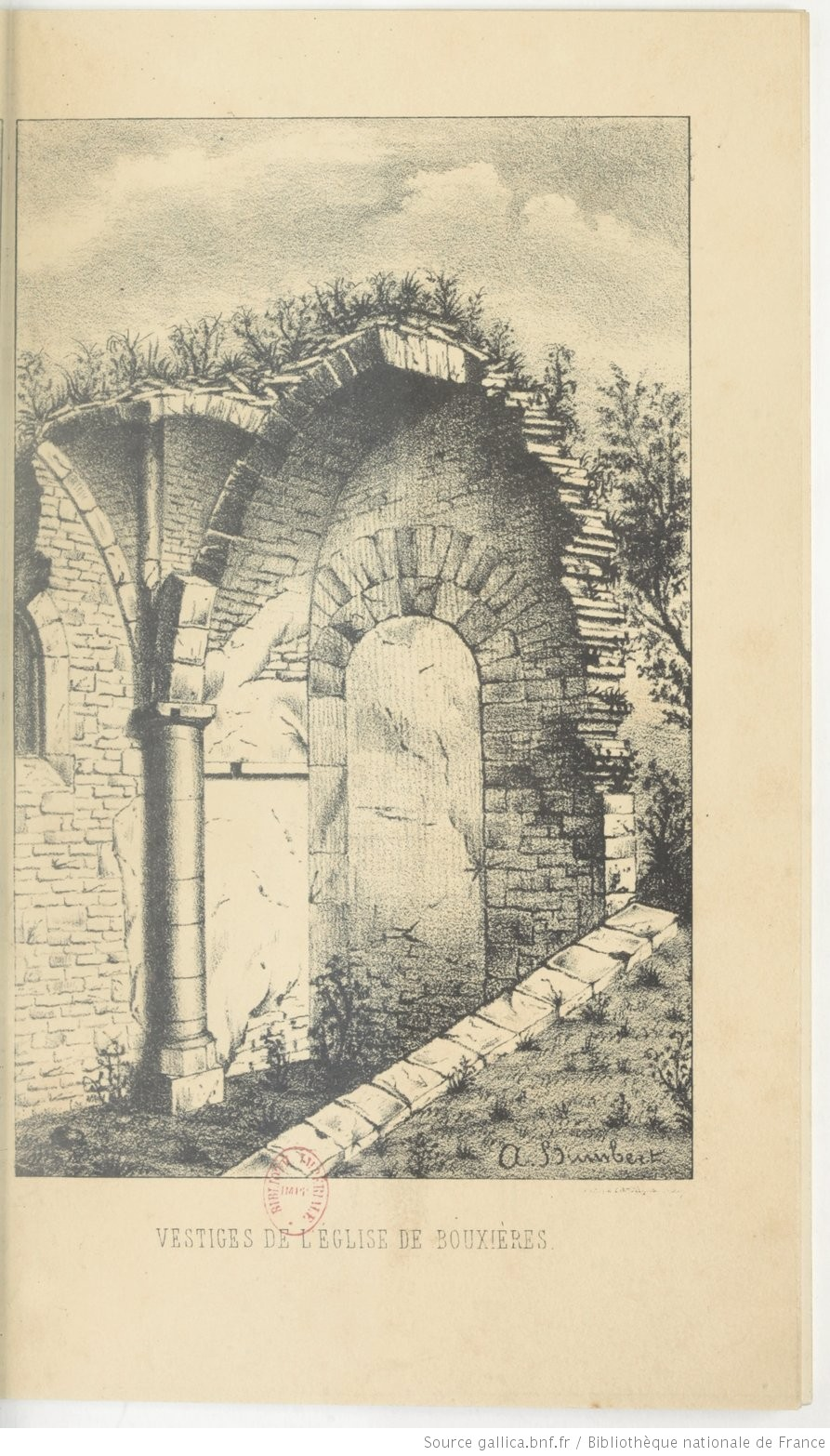
The abbey of Bouxières-aux-Dames

Rothild was born into an aristocratic family, probably the Bosonids. On one hypothesis, she was the daughter of Count Hugh of Bourges and Rothild, a daughter of King Charles the Bald. That she was of the highest nobility is confirmed by a charter of Emperor Otto the Great in 965.

The Abbey of Bouxières was founded by Bishop Gauzelin of Toul (r. 922–966) for some female religious from the Abbey of Saint-Èvre. He installed Rothild as their first abbess. The surviving foundation charter of 13 January 937, however, has been tampered with, if it is not an outright forgery. Nevertheless, the date is not far off, since the earliest reference to Rothild as abbess in an authentic charter is from October 937. Although the new abbey was directly subordinate to the bishop and Rothild held the title of abbess (abbitissa), she was also in some sense under a commendatory abbot (abbas), Odalric, also abbot of Saints-Geosmes.

According to John of Saint-Arnoul's Life of John of Gorze, before she became abbess, Rothild sought the spiritual advice of a certain hermit named Humbert, who lived in a cell in Verdun and had two anchoresses among his followers. When Humbert was subsequently named abbot of Saint-Èvre, it was probably through the influence of Rothild. Rothild is mentioned in many charters as abbess, including Pope Stephen VIII's confirmation of its foundation in 941. Her last mention is in a charter of 966, when Duke Frederick I of Upper Lorraine found in her favour in a dispute over property at Mirecourt. By 977, there was a new abbess, Ermengartis.

== Works cited ==
- Dufour, Jean (1990). "Review of R.-H. Bautier, Les origines de l'abbaye de Bouxières-aux-Dames". Cahiers de Civilisation Médiévale. 33 (129): 66–67.
- Nightingale, John (2001). Monasteries and Patrons in the Gorze Reform: Lotharingia, c.850–1000. Oxford University Press.
- Vanderputten, Steven (2018). Dark Age Nunneries: The Ambiguous Identity of Female Monasticism, 800–1050. Cornell University Press.
- Steven Vanderputten (2021). "They Lived Under That Rule as Do Those Who Have Succeeded Them: Simultaneity and Conflict in the Foundation Narratives of a French Women's Convent (10th–18th Centuries)". The Downside Review. 139 (1): 82–97. doi:10.1177/0012580620963834. hdl:1854/LU-8675623.
- Venarde, Bruce L. (1997). Women's Monasticism and Medieval Society: Nunneries in France and England, 890–1215. Cornell University Press.
