= Equestrian statuette of Charlemagne =

Bronze depiction at the Louvre Museum

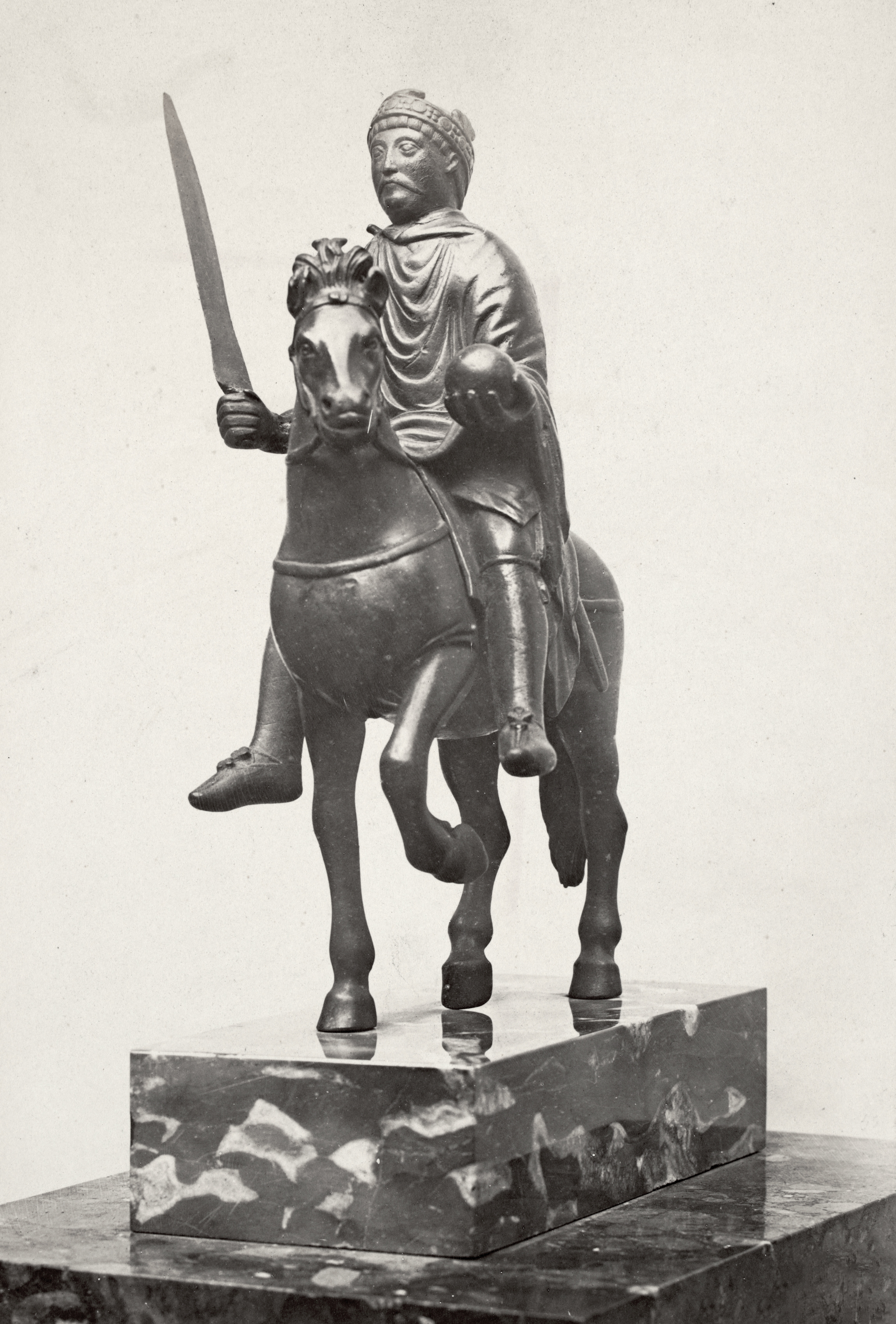
19th-century photograph

A Carolingian-era equestrian statuette in bronze depicting either Charlemagne or his grandson Charles the Bald, a rare example of surviving Carolingian sculpture in metal, is exhibited in the Louvre Museum. In the 16th, 17th and 18th centuries it was kept in Metz Cathedral.

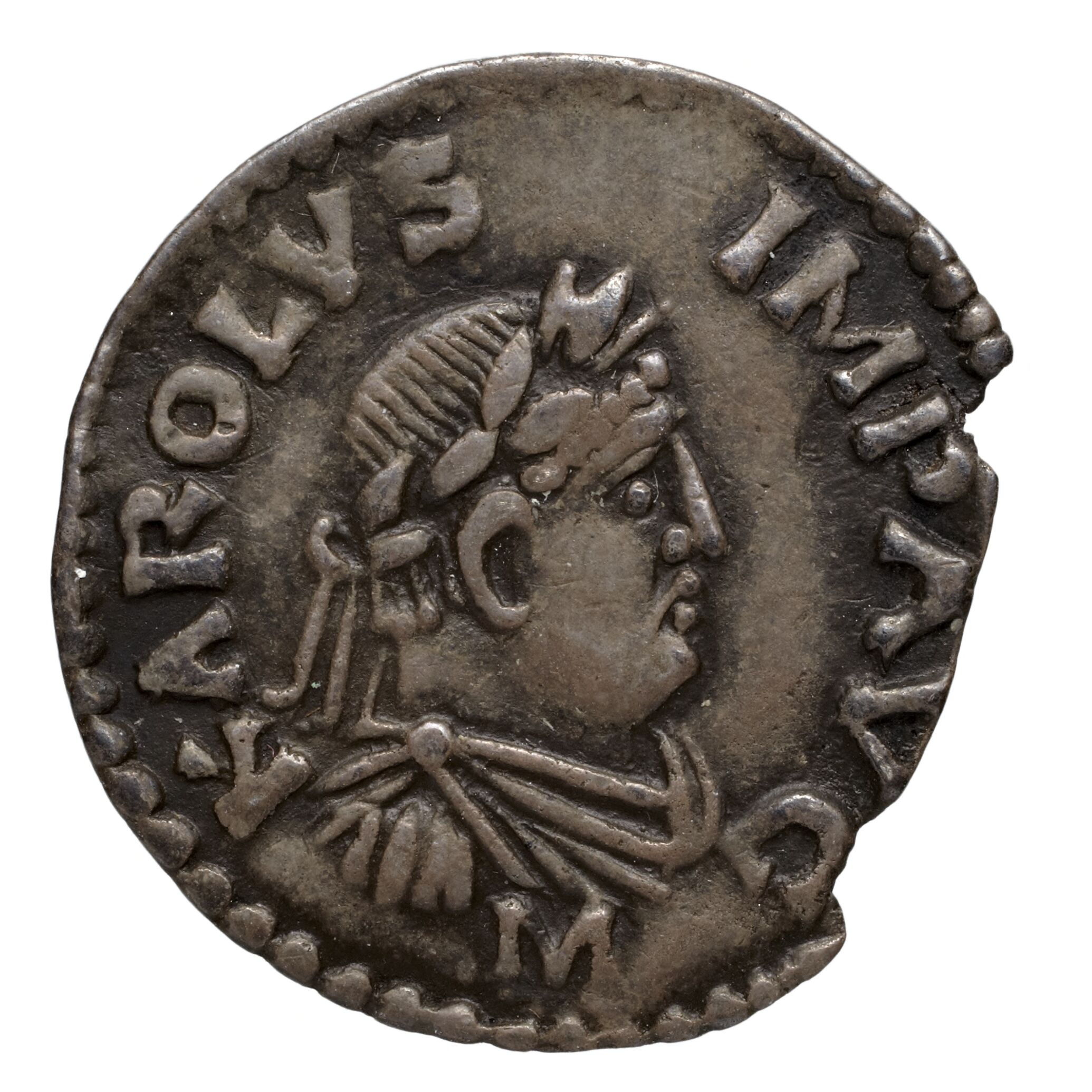
Portrait of Charlemagne in profile on the obverse side of a denier coined in Frankfurt from 812 to 814, today at the Cabinet des Médailles in Paris.

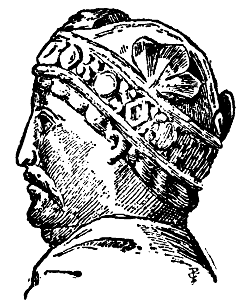
Drawing of the statuette's head in profile, from Nordisk familjebok (1910)

The statuette consists of three parts: the horse, the rider's body with the saddle, and the rider's head. It has a total height of 24 cm. The rider is depicted with a moustache, an open crown on his head, a sword in his right hand (lost), an imperial orb in his left hand, and a riding cloak fastened with a fibula. It was most likely made around 870, i.e. during the reign of Charles the Bald. Carolingian metalwork continues the Gallo-Roman tradition of casting and takes as its templates the equestrian bronzes of the Roman imperial period, such as the Equestrian Statue of Marcus Aurelius or the Regisole of Pavia.

The features of the rider agree with depictions on Charlemagne on coins as well as with the description by Einhard in his Vita Karoli Magni, and the statuette is usually referred to as the "statuette of Charlemagne", but it is possible that the statuette may in fact depict Charlemagne's grandson, Charles the Bald. If so, his depiction in the likeness of his grandfather would have been intentional. Clemens (1890) argued for the statuette's Carolingian age, against Wolfram (1890), and he agreed with Aus'm Weerth (1885) on the point that it is impossible to judge whether it depicts Charlemagne or Charles the Bald. Scholarship of the late 20th century appears more inclined to opt for depiction of Charles the Bald, based on the circumstantial evidence that the work most likely dates to his reign and was kept at Metz Cathedral, suggesting that it may have been commissioned in 869 on the occasion of Charles the Bald's coronation as King of Lotharingia there.

The inventories of Metz cathedral from the 16th century on list two statuettes of Charlemagne; one of gilded silver, made by the Metz silversmith François in 1507, and the other of bronze or "gilded copper", first inventorized in 1567. Both statuettes re-appear in inventories of the 16th century. In 1807, the bronze statuette was acquired by Alexandre Lenoir, founder of the Musée des Monuments Français, in 1807. After Lenoir's death in 1839, his heirs sold it to the private collector Madame Evans-Lombe, who exhibited it at the Exposition Universelle of 1855, after which she sold it to the city of Paris for 5,000 francs. It was kept in the Carnavalet Museum for some time, and it was transferred to the Louvre in 1934 (accession number OA 8260).

== See also ==
- Iconography of Charlemagne
