= Capitulary of Le Mans =

The Capitulary of Le Mans, or the Capitulare in pago Cenomannico datum, is a capitulary traditionally ascribed to Charlemagne and dated to the year 800. In the text, a Frankish ruler named Charles regulates the labour services of peasants in the region of Le Mans in western Francia. Those peasants with more land were obliged to carry out more ploughing services for their lords.

The text has often been used as evidence for Charlemagne's regulation of the peasantry in the early Middle Ages, for instance by Rachel Stone and Chris Wickham. However, it has been suggested that the text was not in fact issued by Charlemagne, though it is still important evidence for attitudes to the peasantry and labour in early medieval Europe.
