= Tetbert of Meaux =

French count

Tetbert (or Theodebert) (died 888) was the Count of Meaux in 877–888. He was related to the Counts of Vermandois and was a brother of Askericus, Bishop of Paris. He died fighting the Vikings in 888.

== Sources ==
- MacLean, Simon. Kingship and Politics in the Late Ninth Century: Charles the Fat and the end of the Carolingian Empire. Cambridge University Press: 2003.

Preceded by Louis the Stammerer	Counts of Meaux; 877–888	Succeeded by Herbert I
