= Askericus =

Bishop of Paris from 886 to 890

Askericus (or Anscharic) (French: Anschéric) (died c. 890) was the Bishop of Paris from 886 until his death. He replaced Bishop Joscelin when the latter died during the Siege of Paris on 16 April 886. He and Count Odo led the defences of the city after Joscelin's death.

Askericus came from a family prominent in the Île-de-France and in the wars with the Vikings. Askericus was probably related to the Counts of Vermandois. His brother Tetbert, Count of Meaux, was killed fighting the Vikings in 888. Askericus was at the court of Charles the Fat and was present at the 20 May 885 coronation of Charles' as rex in Gallia. He came with Charles to Paris, probably as bishop-elect, and was installed as bishop by the king in the city in Autumn. In 887, it was he who went to Kirchen to collect the ransom owed the Vikings for relieving their siege.

== Sources ==
- MacLean, Simon. Kingship and Politics in the Late Ninth Century: Charles the Fat and the end of the Carolingian Empire. Cambridge University Press: 2003.
