= Jacques Sirmond =

French scholar and Jesuit (1559–1651)

Jacques Sirmond (12 October 1559 – 7 October 1651), pseudonym Jacobus Cosmas Fabricius, was a French scholar and Jesuit.

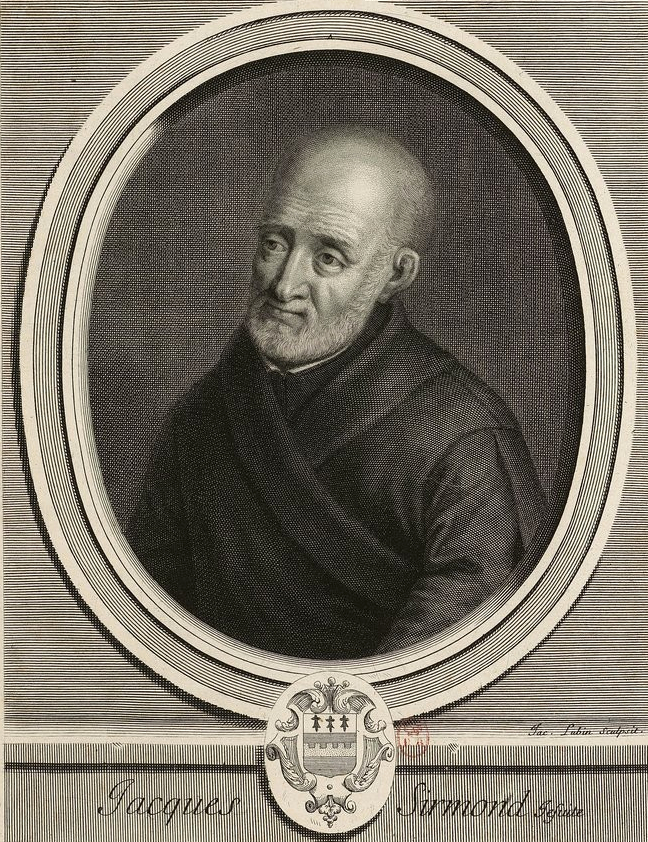
Jacques Sirmond.

Simond was born at Riom, Auvergne, France on 12 October 1559. He was educated at the Jesuit College of Billom. After having been a novice at Verdun and then at Pont-Mousson, he entered into the order on 26 July 1576. After having taught rhetoric at Paris he resided for a long time in Rome as secretary to Claudio Acquaviva (1590–1608). In 1637 he was confessor to Louis XIII. He died on 7 October 1651 in Paris.

== Works ==
He brought out many editions of Latin and Byzantine chroniclers of the Middle Ages:

- Ennodius and Flodoard (1611)
- Sidonius Apollinaris (1614)
- the life of St Leo IX by the archdeacon Wibert (1615)
- Marcellinus and Idatius (1619)
- Anastasius the Librarian (1620)
- Eusebius of Caesarea (1643)
- Hincmar (1645)
- Theodulf of Orléans (1646)
- Hrabanus Maurus (1647)
- Rufinus and Loup de Ferrières (1650)
- his edition of the capitularies of Charles the Bald (Karoli Calvi et successorum aliquot Franciae regum capitula, 1623)
- edition of the councils of ancient France (Concilia antiquae Galliae, 1629, 3 vols., new ed. incomplete, 1789).

An essay in which he denied the identity of St Denis of Paris and St Denis the Areopagite (1641), caused a controversy. His Opera varia, where this essay is to be found, as well as a description in Latin verse of his voyage from Paris to Rome in 1590, have appeared in 5 vols (1696; new ed. Venice, 1728). To him is attributed Elogio di cardinale Baronio (1607).
