= Battle of Andernach (876) =

Battle between East and West Francia

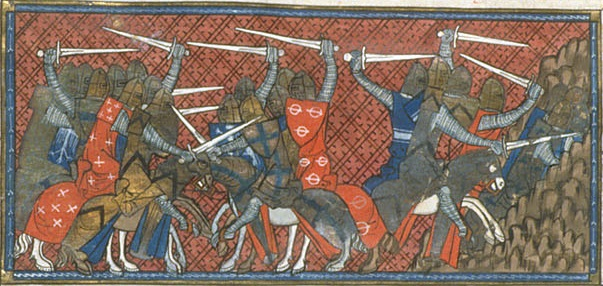
- Miniature of the battle of Andernach between Charles the Bald and Louis, his nephew. Image taken from f. 231v of Chroniques de France ou de St Denis.
Date	8 October 876
Location	Kettig southeast of Andernach 50°26′21″N 7°24′22″E
Result	East Francian victory

Belligerents
West Francia	East Francia

Commanders and leaders
Charles the Bald	Louis the Younger
- Location within Rhineland-Palatinate Battle of Andernach (876) (Europe)

The First Battle of Andernach between the West Frankish king Charles the Bald and the East Frankish king Louis the Younger took place on 8 October 876 near Kettig southeast of Andernach and resulted in Charles' defeat.

== Prelude ==
Louis III (the Younger) was a son of the East Frankish king Louis the German, who divided the East Frankish realm among his sons in 865. Louis the Younger received the largest part of East Francia, while his brothers received Bavaria and Northern Italy. In the Treaty of Meersen, he additionally gained the eastern part of Middle Francia. Charles the Bald, king of West Francia, had tried to occupy the whole of Middle Francia before and only agreed to the treaty due to military pressure. After Louis the German died, Charles again tried to extend West Francia to the east until the river Rhine. To achieve that, he met his nephew Louis the Younger in Sinzig, but Louis did not agree to Charles' plans.

== Battle ==
Charles then tried to conquer the territory on the left bank of the river Rhine. On 8 October 876, this campaign culminated in the battle on a plain near Andernach which resulted in a decisive victory for Louis and stopped all further efforts of Charles to conquer Middle Francia. Charles had to flee to Italy and died almost exactly a year after the battle in Avrieux, Savoy. Among the casualties of the battle were Counts Jerome and Raganar (Reginar) slain, and, as captives, Count Adalard, Count Bernard "Hairypaws", and Gauzlin, Bishop of Paris.

As a result of the battle, Andernach and the Rhineland remained part of East Francia and the Holy Roman Empire into which East Francia later evolved. The border remained almost unchanged until the late Middle Ages. In the Treaty of Ribemont, concluded by Louis the Younger and Charles' grandsons Louis III of France and Carloman of France in 880, East Francia also gained the western part of Middle Francia, including the mouths of the rivers Rhine, Maas and Scheldt and the cities Metz, Sedan, Strasbourg, Toul, Verdun, Cambrai and Antwerp.

== Bibliography ==
- Janet L. Nelson: Charles the Bald. Longman Publisher, London, 1992. ISBN 0-582-05585-7, 0-582-05584-9
- Janet L. Nelson (Translator), The Annals of St-Bertin, Manchester University Press, Manchester, 1991, pp. 196–197.
