= Capitulary of Ver =

9th century Frankish administrative instrument

The Capitulary of Ver was issued by Carloman II in 884 and is often known as the last Carolingian capitulary. It deals with issues including Viking attacks, the creation of guilds, the relation between kings and bishops, and the maintenance of peace.
