= Ricwin, Count of Verdun =

Ricwin (Ricuin, Richwin) (died 923) was a Count of Verdun.

After the death of Lothar II, the Treaty of Meerssen (August 870) divided Lotharingian territories between Louis the German and his half-brother Charles the Bald. This division allocated "comitatum… Viridunense" to Charles, and Ricwin is recorded as Comte in Verdun in a charter dated 895. Evrard has speculated that Ricwin was the brother of Reginar, but this remains unproven.

The chronicler Flodoard of Reims recorded that, in 921, Ricwin (Ricuni infidelis) opposed Charles the Simple, presumably as part of the Revolt of the Nobles of 920. Ricwin, weak in bed, was killed in 923 by Boso of Provence, uncle of Rudolf, who was elected king of France that same year. The murder was apparently instigated by his stepson Adalberon, later Bishop of Metz. Ricwin was succeeded as Count of Verdun by his son Otto.

== Personal life ==
Ricwin first married a daughter whose name is unknown of Engelram, Chamberlain to Charles the Bald, and his wife Friderada. He had his wife beheaded for her lack of chastity. They had one son:

- Otto (d. 943), Count of Verdun and Duke of Lorraine

Ricwin's second wife was Cunigunda, granddaughter of Louis the Stammerer and widow of Wigeric of Lotharingia. No children are recorded, though there is speculation by Evrard that Cunigunda's son Gilbert (Giselbert) was fathered by Ricwin.
