= Pseudo-Isidore =

9th-century Carolingian-era author and forger

Pseudo-Isidore is the conventional name for the unknown Carolingian-era author (or authors) behind an extensive corpus of influential forgeries. Pseudo-Isidore's main object was to provide accused bishops with an array of legal protections amounting to de facto immunity from trial and conviction; to secure episcopal autonomy within the diocese; and to defend the integrity of church property. The forgeries accomplished this goal, in part, by aiming to expand the legal jurisdiction of the Bishop of Rome.

Pseudo-Isidore used a variety of pseudonyms, but similar working methods, a related source basis, and a common vision unite all of his products. The most successful Pseudo-Isidorian forgery, known as the False Decretals, describes itself as having been assembled by a certain Isidorus Mercator (in English: Isidore the Merchant). It is a vast legal collection that contains many authentic pieces, but also more than 90 forged papal decretals. Pseudo-Isidore also produced a compendium of forged secular legislation pretending to be the laws of Charlemagne and Louis the Pious, under the pseudonym Benedictus Levita (Benedict the Deacon). Almost everything about Pseudo-Isidore's identity is controversial, but today most people agree that he worked in the archiepiscopal province of Reims in the decades before 850; and that he conducted important research at the library of the monastery of Corbie.

== Historical background ==
Pseudo-Isidore worked in the second quarter of the ninth-century, in the archiepiscopal province of Reims. A likely candidate is an ordination of Ebbo, then archbishop of Rheims. His sympathies lay with the rank-and-file Frankish episcopate. Decades of royally sponsored church reform had contributed substantially to the prominence and political importance of Frankish bishops; it also contributed to their legal vulnerability, as the reign of Louis I the Pious saw a series of sensational episcopal trials and depositions. Pseudo-Isidore was also heir to a long tradition of Carolingian church reform, and his forgeries also include a wide array of themes reflecting Frankish liturgical, doctrinal, educational and administrative aspirations.

== Content ==
A major constituent of Pseudo-Isidore's output consists of a collection of forged capitulary legislation ascribed to Charlemagne and Louis the Pious. These False Capitularies, which consist mostly of excerpts from genuine biblical, patristic and legal sources, are false primarily in the sense that almost none of them were ever promulgated by the Frankish kings. Among the many genuine items are also select forged capitula that advance the Pseudo-Isidorian program. In a preface, the pseudonymous compiler, Benedictus Levita (Benedict the Deacon) claims that he found these neglected capitularies in the archives of the cathedral at Mainz; and that the former Archbishop Otgar of Mainz ordered him to collect this material for posterity. Because Benedict seems to acknowledge that Otgar is dead at the time of his writing, it has been possible to date his preface to the years after 847.

Pseudo-Isidore also developed a small series of more minor forgeries which we find as appendices in manuscripts of the False Decretals. These include the Capitula Angilramni, a brief collection on criminal procedure allegedly given to Bishop Angilram of Metz by Pope Hadrian I; and a series of excerpts from the Rusticus version of the Council of Chalcedon.

== Authorship ==
The names assumed by Pseudo-Isidore include Isidorus Mercator (conflated from the names of Isidore of Seville and Marius Mercator). Klaus Zechiel-Eckes claims that Pseudo-Isidore did important research at the library of the monastery of Corbie, in the Reims suffragan diocese of Amiens.

Zechiel-Eckes believed that the prominent theologian and abbot of Corbie, Paschasius Radbertus (abbot 842–847) was to be identified with Pseudo-Isidore; and that the earliest phase of work on the forgeries, amounting to a subset of the False Decretals, was completed in the later 830s. These theories once commanded wide support, but today they are increasingly disputed. Eric Knibbs has argued that older, traditional dating schemes, which placed the False Decretals in the 840s or early 850s, were essentially correct. Several decretal forgeries contain material that aims to justify Ebo in his episcopal translation to the bishopric at Hildesheim after 845. It has also emerged that the decretal forgeries incorporate many items from a mid-ninth-century Corbie manuscript of the works of Ennodius of Pavia, which would seem to preclude any dates for the decretal forgeries substantially before the 840s.

== Manuscripts ==
Well over a hundred medieval manuscripts containing Pseudo-Isidorian material survive. The vast majority—around 100—carry copies of the False Decretals.

== Influence ==
The final proof of forgery was provided by Calvinist preacher David Blondel, who discovered that the popes from the early centuries quoted extensively from much-later authors and published his findings (Pseudoisidorus et Turrianus vapulantes) in 1628.
