= Ruothild (abbess of Pfalzel) =

Ruothild (Latin: Ruothildis) was a canoness and the abbess of Pfalzel in the 980s and 990s. She was born into a wealthy aristocratic family. During her tenure, the diocesan clergy of Trier began pushing the canonesses to accept the Benedictine rule and become nuns.

Ruothild first appears as abbess in the 980s. According to the Libellus de rebus Trevirensibus, she had previously been a canoness of Essen Abbey, where she was educated. She was appointed to lead Pfalzel by Archbishop Egbert of Trier (r. 977–993). During her abbacy, Egbert encouraged Pfalzel into artistic production and the production of liturgical vestments. The abbatial church was enlarged and vaulting added. In 988, Ruothild donated the village of Emendadesdorf to the abbey. In 989, she and he brother made a major donation to the abbey, which included 14 serfs.

Ruothild died on 1 December in an unknown year in the 990s. Her exquisitely carved tombstone declares her to have been the "spouse of the Redeemer" (a virgin), a "comely canoness" and a "true nun". The carving was lost after the canonry was closed in 1016, dug up in 1479, reburied, rediscovered in 1772 and mounted on a wall. It is preserved today in the Rheinisches Landesmuseum Trier. The text of the tombstone was copied into the Libellus in the early 11th century. The inscription has been interpreted as a rejection of the Benedictine rule, since Ruothild was already a "true nun", or as indicating that she was already living under the Benedictine rule voluntarily and was perhaps allied with the male clergy.

== Works cited ==
- Le Jan, Régine (2001). "Entre maîtres et dépendants: Réflexions sur la famille paysanne en Lotharingie, aux IX^{e} et X^{e} siècles". Femmes, pouvoir et société dans le haut Moyen Age. Picard. pp. 239–254.
- Parisse, Michel (2011). Religieux et religieuses en Empire: Du X^{e} au XII^{e} siècle. Picard.
- Vanderputten, Steven (2018). Dark Age Nunneries: The Ambiguous Identity of Female Monasticism, 800–1050. Cornell University Press.
