= Klaus Zechiel-Eckes =

German historian

Klaus Zechiel-Eckes (12 May 1959 in Pforzheim – 23 February 2010 in Cologne) was a German historian and medievalist.

Klaus Zechiel-Eckes graduated from high school in 1978. From 1979 to 1990, he studied history and Romance and Middle Latin philology in Saarland University and the University of Freiburg. At Freiburg, he was a student of Hubert Mordek's. In 1985, he sat the State Examination. In 1990, he received his doctorate in Freiburg in Medieval history with a thesis on the Concordia canonum of Cresconius. In 1998, he completed his habilitation in Freiburg in the fields of Medieval History and the historical sciences, with a focus on Florus of Lyon. He followed this with professorships at LMU Munich (1999 to 2000) and the University of Zurich (2002 to 2003). In the winter of 2003 to 2004, he succeeded Tilman Struve as professor of History of the Early and High Middle Ages at the University of Cologne.

His research focused on the political, church and canonical history of the early and high Middle Ages. He also studied intellectual and book history, especially of the Carolingian period, and specialized in the historical sciences, especially codicology. His research, grounded in source and manuscript studies, led to revolutionary discoveries about the origin of the Pseudo-Isidorian Decretals, namely that they were assembled at the monastery of Corbie under the direction of Paschasius Radbertus in the later 830s.

From 2007, Zechiel-Eckes was a regular member of the executive board of the Monumenta Germaniae Historica and member of the North Rhine-Westphalian Academy of Sciences, Humanities and the Arts.

== Publications ==
- Die Concordia canonum des Cresconius: Studien und Edition. Frankfurt am Main u.a. 1992 (Freiburger Beiträge zur mittelalterlichen Geschichte. Studien und Texte, Bd. 5) ISBN 3-631-44932-1.
- Florus von Lyon als Kirchenpolitiker und Publizist. Studien zur Persönlichkeit eines karolingischen "Intellektuellen" am Beispiel der Auseinandersetzung mit Amalarius (835–838) und des Prädestinationsstreits (851–855). Stuttgart 1999 (Quellen und Forschungen zum Recht im Mittelalter, Bd. 8) ISBN 3-7995-6087-4.
- Ein Blick in Pseudoisidors Werkstatt. Studien zum Entstehungsprozeß der falschen Dekretalen. Mit einem exemplarischen editorischen Anhang (Pseudo-Julius an die orientalischen Bischöfe, JK +196). In: Francia Bd. 28.1, 2001, S. 37–90.
- Auf Pseudoisidors Spur. Oder: Versuch, einen dichten Schleier zu lüften. In: Wilfried Hartmann/Gerhard Schmitz (Hgg.): Fortschritt durch Fälschungen? Ursprung, Gestalt und Wirkungen der pseudoisidorischen Fälschungen. Beiträge zum gleichnamigen Symposium an der Universität Tübingen vom 27. und 28. Juli 2001. Hannover 2002 (MGH Studien und Texte, Bd. 31), S. 1–28.
- Katalog der frühmittelalterlichen Fragmente der Universitäts- und Landesbibliothek Düsseldorf : vom beginnenden achten bis zum ausgehenden neunten Jahrhundert, Wiesbaden : Reichert, 2003
- Buchbinder wetzen das Messer...: Mittelalterliche Handschriften und Urkunden als Einbandmakulatur. In: Dietrich Borschung/Hansgerd Hellenkemper (Hgg.): Kosmos der Zeichen: Schriftbild und Bildformel in Antike und Mittelalter. Wiesbaden 2007 (Schriften des Lehr- und Forschungszentrums für die antiken Kulturen des Mittelalters Bd. 5), S. 141–160.
- Rebellische Kleriker? Eine unbekannte kanonistisch-patristische Polemik gegen Bischof Hinkmar von Laon in Cod. Paris, BNF, nouv. acq. lat. 1746. Hannover 2009 (MGH Studien und Texte, Bd. 49), ISBN 978-3-7752-5709-1.
- Frühe Pseudoisidor-Rezeption bei Hinkmar von Laon: ein Fragment des verloren geglaubten "Unterschriftenwerks" vom Juli 869. In: Deutsches Archiv für Erforschung des Mittelalters Bd. 66.1, 2010, S. 19–54.
- (postum erschienen) Fälschung als Mittel politischer Auseinandersetzung. Ludwig der Fromme (814–840) und die Genese der pseudoisidorischen Dekretalen. Paderborn 2011 (Nordrhein-Westfälische Akademie der Wissenschaften und der Künste, Vorträge G 428)
- (postum erschienen) Die erste Dekretale. Der Brief Papst Siricius' an Bischof Himerius von Tarragona vom Jahr 385 (JK 255). Aus dem Nachlass mit Ergänzungen herausgegeben von Detlev Jasper. Hannover 2013 (Monumenta Germaniae Historica. Studien und Texte 55) ISBN 978-3-7752-5715-2.

== Bibliography ==
- Theo Kölzer: Nachruf auf Klaus Zechiel-Eckes. In: Jahrbuch der Nordrhein-Westfälischen Akademie der Wissenschaften und der Künste, Jg. 2011, 2011, S. 134–139.
- Gerhard Schmitz: Klaus Zechiel-Eckes. In: Deutsches Archiv für Erforschung des Mittelalters Bd. 66.2, 2010, S. 639–648.
