= Treaty of Coulaines =

843 treaty in West Francia

The Treaty of Coulaines, named after the western French locality of Coulaines near Le Mans, was concluded in late 843 between Charles the Bald, king of West Francia, and his nobility and clergy. Since its validity was limited to West Francia, it has been interpreted as marking the start of a divergence between the respective legal orders of what would become the Kingdom of France and the Kingdom of Germany, just a few months after the two realms had been defined by the Treaty of Verdun. The treaty restricted the powers of the king and guaranteed rights of the nobility and clergy.

The treaty was concluded as Charles was coming back from an unsuccessful campaign against Brittany, in the form of a capitulary. In its chapters, the treaty delimits the spheres of power of the church, the nobility and the king, and places them in a legal reciprocal relationship. In particular, the defense of the church is attributed not only to the king, as had been the case previously, but jointly to the king and nobility. The treaty's second chapter defines royal power in terms of obedience from the king's vassals, in contrast to a notion of divine right of kings. Some historians such as Adelheid Krah have interpreted it as an early kind of constitutional document.
