= Cresconius =

Cresconius is a given name. Notable people with the name include:

- Flavius Cresconius Corippus, 6th-century poet
- Cresconius Africanus, 7th-century bishop
- Cresconius of Santiago de Compostela, 11th-century bishop

== See also ==
- Papilio cresconius, species of butterfly
