= Siege of Paris (885–886) =

Raid on the Seine in the Kingdom of West Franks

- Part of the Viking expansion
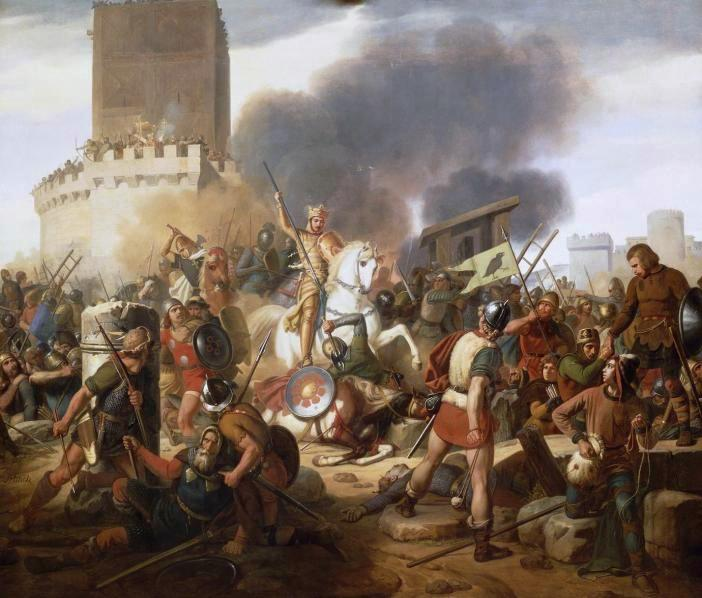
- Count Odo defends Paris against the Norsemen, romantic painting by Jean-Victor Schnetz (1837), Galerie des Batailles
Date	25 November 885 – October 886
Location	Paris, on the Seine, Frankish Empire 48.854°N 2.347°E
Result	Frankish victory

Belligerents
Vikings	Frankish Empire

Commanders and leaders
Sigfred; Sinric; Rollo	Odo, Count of Paris; Gozlin, Bishop of Paris; Henry of Saxony †; Charles the Fat

Strength
Initially 300–700 ships, 30,000–40,000 men (high-end, Abbo Cernuus); a majority sailed further upriver in February; Sigfred's contingent left in April	Initially 200 men-at-arms (Abbo Cernuus); gained reinforcements during the summer; Charles the Fat arrived with his army in October

The siege of Paris of 885–886 was part of a Viking raid on the Seine, in the western part of the Frankish Empire. The siege was the most important event of the reign of Charles the Fat and a turning point in the fortunes of the Carolingian dynasty and the history of France. It also proved for the Franks the strategic importance of Paris at a time when it also was one of the largest cities in West Francia. The siege is the subject of an eyewitness account in the Latin poem Bella Parisiacae urbis of Abbo Cernuus.

With hundreds of ships, and possibly tens of thousands of men, the Vikings arrived outside Paris in late November 885, demanding tribute. This was denied by Odo, Count of Paris, despite the fact he could assemble only several hundred soldiers to defend the city. The Vikings attacked with a variety of siege engines but failed to break through the city walls despite days of intense attacks. The siege was maintained for months but without any significant assaults after the initial attack. As the siege continued, most of the Vikings left Paris to pillage further upriver. The Vikings made a final unsuccessful attempt to take the city during the summer. In October, Charles the Fat arrived with his army.

To the frustration of the Parisians who had fought to defend the city, Charles stopped short of attacking the Viking invaders. Instead, he allowed them to sail farther up the Seine to raid Burgundy (which was in revolt) and promised a payment of 700 livres (257 kg) of silver. Odo, highly critical of this, attempted to defy Charles' promises. When Charles died in 888, Odo was elected the first non-Carolingian king of the Franks.

== Background ==
Although the Vikings had attacked parts of Francia previously, they reached Paris for the first time in 845, sacking the city. They attacked Paris three more times in the 860s, leaving only when they had acquired sufficient loot or bribes. In 864, by the Edict of Pistres, bridges were ordered built across the Seine at Pîtres and in Paris, where two were built, one on each side of the Île de la Cité, which served admirably in the siege of 885. The chief ruler in the region around Paris (the Île-de-France) was the duke of Francia (also the count of Paris), who controlled the lands between the Seine and Loire. Originally this was Robert the Strong, margrave of Neustria and missus dominicus for the Loire Valley. He began fortifying the capital and fought the Norsemen continuously until his death in the Battle of Brissarthe. His son Odo succeeded him, but royal power declined. Paris continued to be fortified due to local, rather than royal, initiative.

West Francia suffered under a series of short-reigning kings after the death of Charles the Bald in 877. This situation prevailed until 884 when Charles the Fat, already King of Germany and Italy, became king, raising hopes of reunification of Charlemagne's empire. While it was thought that the Franks had gained an upper hand against the Vikings after the victory of Louis III at the Battle of Saucourt in 881, in 885, a year after the succession of Charles, the Vikings launched their largest attack on Paris.

== Siege ==
Vikings under Sigfred and Sinric sailed towards West Francia again in 885, having raided the north-eastern parts of the country before. Sigfred demanded a bribe from Charles but was refused, and he promptly led 700 ships up the Seine, carrying perhaps as many as 30,000 or 40,000 men. The number, the largest ever recorded for a Viking fleet in contemporary sources, originates from poet Abbo Cernuus. Although an eyewitness, there is general agreement among historians that Abbo's numbers are "a gross exaggeration," with Abbo being "in a class of his own as an exaggerator." Historian C. W. Previté-Orton has instead put the number of ships at 300, and John Norris at "some 300." Although the Franks tried to block the Vikings from sailing up the Seine, the Vikings eventually managed to reach Paris. Paris at this time was a town on an island, known today as Île de la Cité. Its strategic importance came from the ability to block ships' passage with its two low-lying footbridges, one of wood and one of stone. Not even the shallow Viking ships could pass Paris because of the bridges. Count Odo prepared for the arrival of the Vikings by fortifying the bridgehead with two towers guarding each bridge. He was low on men, having no more than 200 men-at-arms available (also according to Abbo), but led a joint defence with Gozlin, Bishop of Paris (the first "fighting bishop" in medieval literature), and had the aid of his brother Robert, two counts, and a marquis.

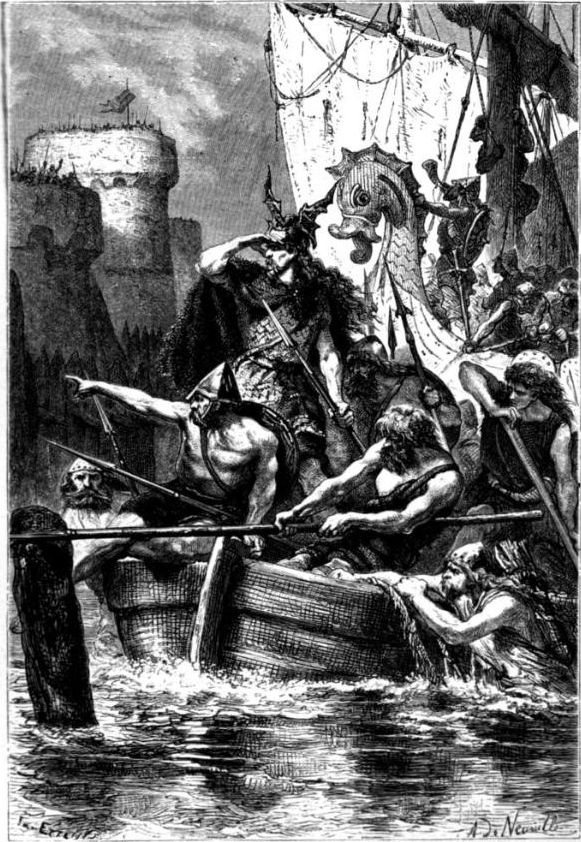
The barques of the Vikings

The Vikings arrived in Paris on 24 or 25 November 885, initially asking for tribute from the Franks. When this was denied, they began a siege. On 26 November the Vikings attacked the northeast tower with ballistae, mangonels, and catapults. They were repulsed by a mixture of hot wax and pitch. All Viking attacks that day were repulsed, and during the night the Parisians constructed another storey on the tower. On 27 November the Viking attack included mining, battering rams, and fire, but to no avail. Bishop Gozlin entered the fray with a bow and an axe. He planted a cross on the outer defences and exhorted the people. His brother Ebles also joined the fighting. The Vikings withdrew after the failed initial attacks and built a camp on the right side of the riverbank, using stone as construction material. While preparing for new attacks, the Vikings also started constructing additional siege engines. In a renewed assault, they shot a thousand grenades against the city, sent a ship for the bridge, and made a land attack with three groups. The forces surrounded the bridgehead tower, possibly mainly aiming to bring down the river obstacle. While they tried setting fire to the bridge, they also attacked the city with siege engines.

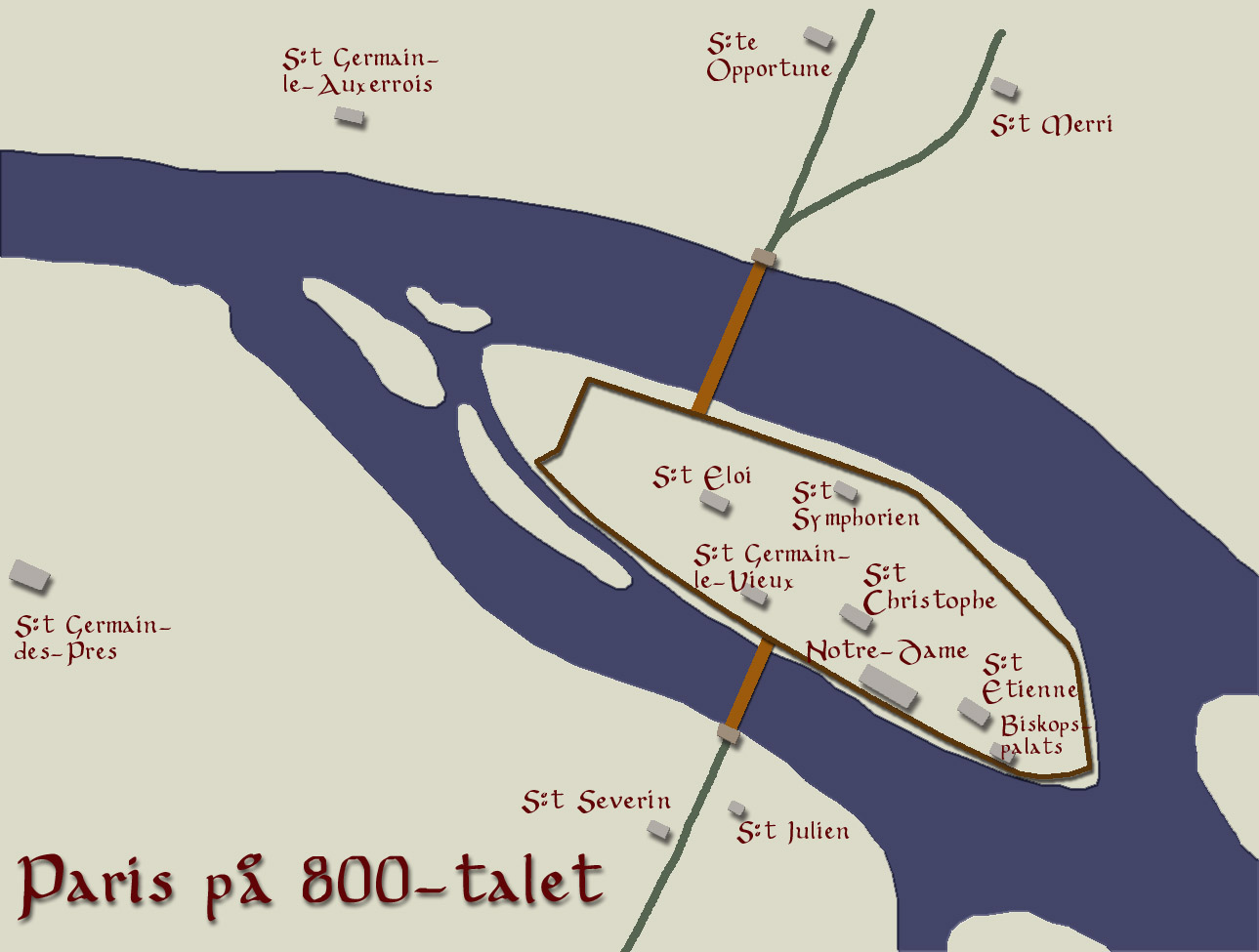
Map of Paris in the 9th century (on Île de la Cité)

For two months the Vikings maintained the siege, making trenches and provisioning themselves off the land. In January 886 they tried to fill the river shallows with debris, plant matter, and the bodies of dead animals and dead prisoners to try to get around the tower. They continued this for two days. On the third day, they set three ships alight and guided them towards the wooden bridge. The burning ships sank before they could set the bridge on fire, but the wooden construction was weakened. On 6 February, rains caused the debris-filled river to overflow and the bridge supports to give way. With the bridge gone, the northeast tower was isolated with only 12 defenders inside. The Vikings asked the 12 to surrender, but they refused and were all subsequently killed.

The Vikings left a force around Paris, but many ventured further to pillage Le Mans, Chartres, Evreux and into the Loire. Odo successfully slipped some men through Norse lines to go to Italy and plead with Charles to come to their aid. Henry, Count of Saxony, Charles' chief man in Germany, marched to Paris. Weakened by marching during the winter, Henry's soldiers made only one abortive attack in February before retreating. The besieged forces sallied forth to obtain supplies. The morale of the besiegers was low, and Sigfred asked for 60 pounds of silver. He left the siege in April. Another Viking leader, Rollo, stayed behind with his men. In May, disease began to spread in the Parisian ranks, and Gozlin died. Odo then slipped through Viking-controlled territory to petition Charles for support; Charles consented. Odo fought his way back into Paris, and Charles and Henry of Saxony marched northward. According to Joshua J. Mark, "at some point in 886, Odo returned with the armies of Charles the Fat. He fought his way through the Viking forces and into the city with his men; the Vikings in quick pursuit. Odo organized an immediate defence and the Danes were again driven back to their ships." Henry died, however, after he fell into the Viking ditches, where he was captured and killed.

That summer, the Vikings made a final attempt to take the city but were repulsed. The imperial army arrived in October and scattered the Vikings. Charles encircled Rollo and his army and set up a camp at Montmartre. However, Charles had no intention of fighting. He allowed the Vikings to sail up the Seine to ravage Burgundy, which was in revolt. When the Vikings withdrew from France the next spring, Charles gave them 700 livres (pounds) of silver as promised, amounting to approximately 257 kg.

== Aftermath ==
The Parisians and Odo refused to let the Vikings down the Seine, and the invaders had to drag their boats overland to the Marne to leave the country. When Charles died in 888, the French elected Odo as their king. Odo's brother Robert I of France was later elected king as well, in opposition to the Carolingian Charles the Simple. Throughout the 9th century, the Robertians, descendants of Robert the Strong, held the crown and remained leading figures in West Francia. However, their rulership was highly fragmented as their authority was challenged by minor countships and castellanies. The princelings of West Francia elected Robert I's grandson, Hugh Capet, king in 987.

The Viking invasion as well as further persistent raidings of the city destroyed much of the urban infrastructure on the Left Bank, which eventually converted to agricultural use, while the Right Bank were mostly spared from pillaging, with subsequent development favoring the Right Bank.

== Representation in popular media ==
Following the popularization of the Viking sagas many different medias such as TV shows, and video games gave new artistic depictions of the Viking raids as well as the lifestyle and world that the Vikings lived in over 1,200 years ago.

The TV show Vikings includes the siege in the third season in the 8th-10th episodes.

In video games, the most recent adaptation of the Siege of Paris can be found in the 2020 game Assassin's Creed Valhalla where in one of the expansions called "The Siege of Paris" players can take part in the famous siege as a Viking and relive dramatizations of some of the most important moments throughout the siege and also get to experience life in medieval France during that time.
