= Richilde of Provence =

Carolingian empress from 875 to 877

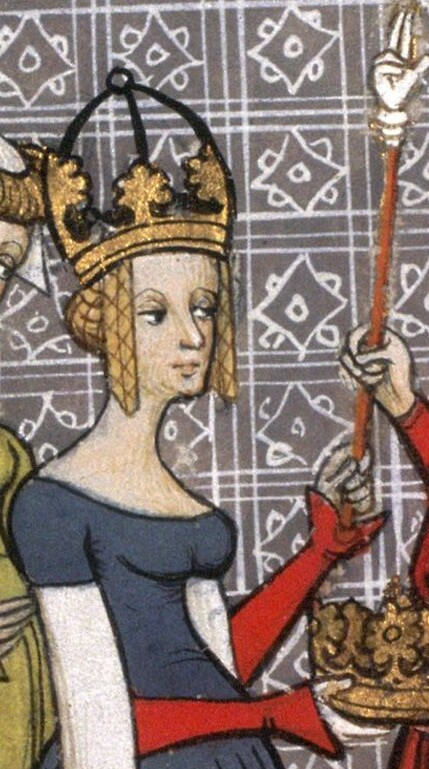
- Richilde of Provence in an illumination from a manuscript of the Grandes Chroniques de France. 14th–15th century National Library of France, Department of Manuscripts, French 73, folio 163

Empress consort of the Carolingian Empire
- Tenure: 29 December 875 – 6 October 877

Queen consort of West Francia
- Tenure: c. 870 – 6 October 877
- Born: c. 845
- Died: 2 June 910 (aged 64–65)
- Spouse: Charles the Bald
- Issue: Rothilde
- House: Bivinids
- Father: Bivin of Gorze

Richilde of Provence (c. 845 – 2 June 910, Kingdom of Lower Burgundy) (also Richildis) was the second wife of the Frankish emperor Charles the Bald. By her marriage, she became queen and later empress. She ruled as regent in 877.

== Life ==
Richilde was the daughter of Bivin of Gorze, Count of the Ardennes, and the sister of Boso of Provence (of the Bosonid dynasty). Her aunt was Theutberga, the wife of Lothar II of Lotharingia. Her marriage to Charles the Bald, in 870 after the death of his first wife, Ermentrude of Orléans, was intended to secure his rule in Lotharingia through her powerful family and her connection to Theutberga, the previous queen. Richilde bore Charles five children, but only the eldest daughter, Rothilde, survived to adulthood.

Whenever Charles went to war, Richilde managed the realm. She may have briefly ruled as regent after the death of Charles in 877. Louis the Stammerer (son of Charles the Bald and Ermentrude of Orléans), who had succeeded his father, died on 10 April 879, while his children were too young to rule on their own. While Richilde's brother, Boso, did make a bid for the throne, the Carolingians were vehement in their refusal, and he gave up the attempt. Boso went on to become the king of Provence.

Richilde attempted to assume a position of authority upon the death of Louis III in 882, and of Carloman II in 884; however, the empire was agitated and under threat by the Normans, and the grandees of the realm forced her to withdraw to Provence, then the realm of her nephew Louis the Blind, where she died on 2 June 910.

Royal titles
| Preceded by Engelberga | Carolingian empress 875–877 | Succeeded by Richardis |
| Preceded by Ermentrude of Orléans | Queen consort of Western Francia; 870–877 | Succeeded by Adelaide of Paris |
