= Capitulary =

Edicts of the Frankish Empire

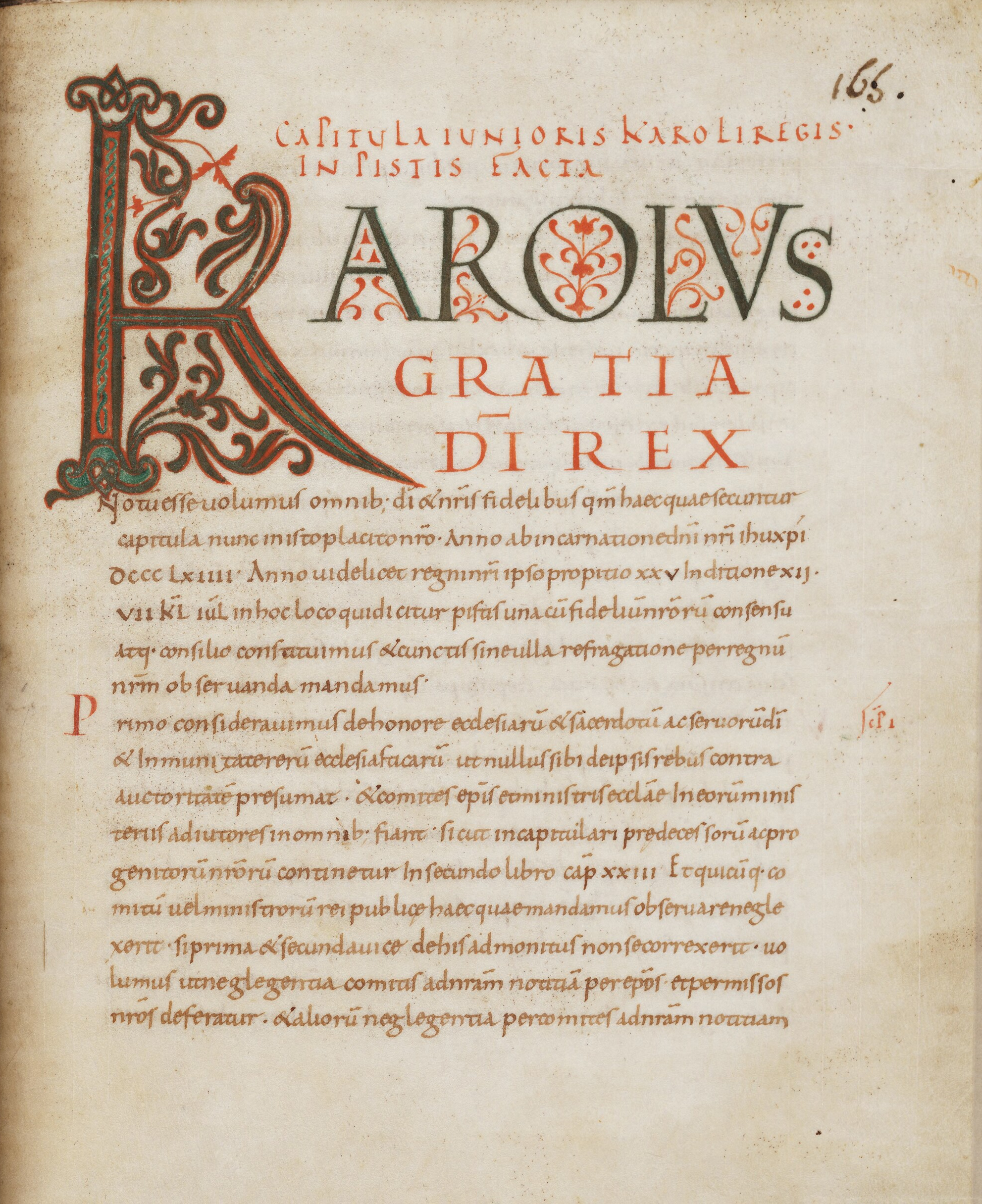
Start of a capitulary of Charlemagne in the 9th-century manuscript Beinecke 413

A capitulary (medieval Latin capitulare) was a series of legislative or administrative acts emanating from the Frankish court of the Merovingian and Carolingian dynasties, especially that of Charlemagne, the first emperor of the Romans in the west since the collapse of the Western Roman Empire in the late 5th century. They were so called because they were formally divided into sections called capitula (plural of capitulum, a diminutive of caput meaning "head(ing)": chapters).

As soon as the capitulary was composed, it was sent to the various functionaries of the Frankish Empire, archbishops, bishops, missi dominici and counts, a copy being kept by the chancellor in the archives of the palace. The last emperor to draw up capitularies was Lambert of Italy, in 898.

== Preservation and study ==
At the present day not a single capitulary survives in its original form; but very frequently copies of these isolated capitularies were included in various scattered manuscripts, among material of a very different nature, ecclesiastical or secular. A number of them have been found in books which go back as far as the 9th or 10th centuries. Most recent editions note the manuscripts from which a capitulary has been collated.

Such capitularies make provisions of a varied nature: it was necessary at an early date to classify them into chapters according to the subject. In 827 Ansegisus, abbot of St. Wandrille at Fontenelle, made such a collection. He arranged them in four books: one grouped together the ecclesiastical capitularies of Charlemagne, another the ecclesiastical capitularies of Louis I, Charlemagne's son, another the secular capitularies of Charlemagne, and yet another the secular capitularies of Louis, bringing together similar provisions and suppressing duplicates. This collection soon acquired official status: after 829 Louis the Pious refers to it, citing book and section.

New capitularies were naturally promulgated after 827, and so it was that by 858 there had appeared a second collection in three books, compiled by an author calling himself Benedictus Levita. His avowed aim was to complete the work of Ansegisus and bring it up to date. However, the author not only included prescriptions from the capitularies, but introduced other documents into his collection: fragments of Roman laws, canons of the Church councils and especially spurious provisions very similar in character to those of the same date found in the False Decretals. Despite these spurious items, the collection as a whole was accepted as authentic, and the four books of Ansegisus and the three of Benedictus Levita were treated together as a single collection in seven books. Modern historians, however, are careful to avoid using Books Five, Six, and Seven for purposes of reference.

Early editors chose to republish the collection of Ansegisus and Benedictus as they found it. It was a distinguished French scholar, Étienne Baluze, who led the way to a fresh classification. In 1677 he brought out the Capitularia regum francorum, in two folio volumes, in which he published first the capitularies of the Merovingian kings, then those of Pepin the Short, of Charles and of Louis the Pious, which he had found complete in various manuscripts. For works after 840, he also published as supplements the unreliable collection of Ansegisus and Benedictus Levita, with warning about the untrustworthy character of the latter. He followed these with the capitularies of Charles the Bald, and of other Carolingian kings, either contemporaries or successors of Charles, which he had discovered in various places. A second edition of Baluze was published in 1780 in 2 folio volumes by Pierre de Chiniac.

The edition of the Capitularies made in 1835 by Georg Pertz, in the Monumenta Germaniae Historica (folio edition, vol. I, of the Leges), was not much of an advance on that of Baluze. A fresh revision was required, and the editors of the Monumenta decided to reissue it in their quarto series, entrusting the work to Dr Alfred Boretius. In 1883 Boretius published his first volume, containing all the detached capitularies up to 827, together with various appendices bearing on them, and the collection of Ansegisus. Boretius, whose health had been ruined by overwork, was unable to finish the project, which was continued by Victor Krause. He collected in a second volume the scattered capitularies dated after 828. A detailed index of both volumes was drawn up by Karl Zeumer and Albrecht Werminghoff. It listed all the essential terms. A third volume, prepared by Emil Seckel, was to include Benedictus Levita's collection. To satisfy modern critical requirements, a new edition has been commissioned by the Monumenta Germaniae Historica, to be prepared by Hubert Mordek and Klaus Zechiel-Eckes; the edition of the Collectio Ansegisi is superseded by the one published in the Capitularia Nova Series vol. 1 (ed. Gerhard Schmitz, 1996).

== Contents and scope ==
Among the capitularies are to be found documents of a very varied kind. Boretius has divided them into several classes:

=== Capitula legibus addenda ===
These are additions made by the king of the Franks to the barbarian laws promulgated under the Merovingians, the Salic law, the Ripuarian or the Bavarian. These capitularies have the same weight as the law which they complete; they are particular in their application, applying, that is to say, only to the men subject to that law. Like the laws, they consist chiefly of scales of compensation, rules of procedure and points of civil law. They were solemnly promulgated in the local assemblies where the consent of the people was asked. Charlemagne and Louis the Pious seem to have made efforts to bring the other laws into harmony with the Salic law. By certain of the capitularies of this class, the king adds provisions affecting, not only a single law, but all the laws in use throughout the kingdom.

=== Capitula ecclesiastica ===
These capitularies were elaborated by councils of bishops; the Frankish kings sanctioned the canon of the councils, and made them obligatory for all Christians in the kingdom.

=== Capitula per se scribenda ===
These embodied political decrees which all subjects of the kingdom were bound to observe. They often bore the name of edictuin or of constitutio, and the provisions made in them were permanent. These capitularies were generally elaborated by the king of the Franks in the autumn assemblies or in the committees of the spring assemblies. Frequently we have only the proposition made by the king to the committee, capitula tractanda cum comitibus, episcopis, et abbatibus, and not the final form which was adopted.

=== Capitula missorum ===
These are the instructions given by Charlemagne and his successors to the missi dominici sent into the various parts of the empire. They are sometimes drawn up in common for all the missi of a certain year (capitula missorum generalia); sometimes for the missi sent only on a given circuit (capitula missorum specialia). These instructions sometimes hold good only for the circuit of the missus; they have no general application and are merely temporary.

=== Incorporated capitularies ===
With the capitularies have been incorporated various documents; for instance, the rules to be observed in administering the king's private domain (the celebrated Capitulare de villis vel curtis imperii, which is doubtless a collection of the instructions sent at various times to the agents of these domains); the partitions of the kingdom among the king's sons, as the Divisio regnorum of 806, or the Ordinatio imperii of 817; the oaths of peace and brotherhood which were taken on various occasions by the sons of Louis the Pious, etc.

The merit of clearly establishing these distinctions belongs to Boretius. He has doubtless exaggerated the difference between the Capitula missorum and the Capitula per se scribenda; among the first are to be found provisions of a general and permanent nature, and among the second temporary measures are often included. But the idea of Boretius is nonetheless fruitful. In the capitularies there are usually permanent provisions and temporary provisions intermingled; and the observation of this fact has made it possible more clearly to understand certain institutions of Charlemagne, e.g. military service.

After the reign of Louis the Pious, the capitularies became long and diffuse. Soon (from the 10th century onwards) no provision of general application emanates from the kings. Henceforth the kings only regulated private interests by charters; it was not until the reign of Philip Augustus that general provisions again appeared, but when they did so they bore the name "ordinances" (ordonnances).

There were also capitularies of the Lombards. These capitularies formed a continuation of the Lombard laws, and are printed as an appendix to these laws by Boretius in the folio edition of the Monumenta Germaniae, Leges, vol. iv.

== Primary sources ==
- Capitularies of Ansegisus (assembled 827), ed. Gerhard Schmitz (1996). Die Kapitulariensammlung des Ansegis (Collectio capitularium Ansigisi). MGH Cap. NS 1. Hanover.
- Capitulary of Le Mans
- Capitulary of 802
- Capitulary of Servais (853)
- Edict of Pîtres (864)
- Capitulary of Quierzy (887)
- Capitulary of Ver (884)
