= Rothild (daughter of Charles the Bald) =

French countess

- Born: 871
- Died: circa 928/929
- Spouse: Roger, Count of Maine
- Issue: Hugh I, Count of Maine
- House: Carolingian
- Father: Charles the Bald
- Mother: Richilde of Provence

Rothilde (Latin: Rothildis; 871 – 928/929) was a lady born into the royal family of Western Francia.

Rothilde was a daughter of the King of the Franks, Charles the Bald, son of Louis the Pious. Her mother was Charles’ second spouse, Queen Richilde of Provence, sister of King Boso of Provence.

Around 890, Rothilde married Roger, Count of Maine. Their eldest child was Hugh I, Count of Maine. Their second child was a daughter, Judith, who married Hugh the Great, duke of the Franks and count of Paris. (Note: Barton indicates an unknown daughter of Rothilde and Roger married Hugh the Great.)

== Sources ==
- Barton, Richard E. (2004). Lordship in the County of Maine, c.890-1160. The Boydell Press.
- Keats-Rohan, K.S.B. (1994). "Two Studies in North French Prosopography". Journal of Medieval History. 20: 3–37. doi:10.1016/0304-4181(93)00747-C.
- Riche, Pierre (1983). The Carolingians: The Family who forged Europe. Translated by Allen, Michael Idomir. University of Pennsylvania Press.
