= Joscelin (bishop of Paris) =

Bishop of Paris (died 886)

Joscelin, Goslin, or Gauzlin (died 16 April 886), Bishop of Paris and defender of the city against the Northmen (885), was, according to some authorities, the son of Rorgon I, count of Maine, according to others the natural son of the emperor Louis I.

In 848 he became a monk, and entered a monastery at Reims, later he became abbot of Saint-Denis. Like most of the prelates of his time he took a prominent part in the struggle against the Northmen, by whom he and his brother Louis were taken prisoners (858), and he was released only after paying a heavy ransom (Prudentii Trecensis episcopi Annales, ann. 858). From 855 to 867 he held intermittently, and from 867 to 881 regularly, the office of chancellor to Charles the Bald and his successors.

In 883 or 884 he was elected bishop of Paris, and foreseeing the dangers to which the city was to be exposed from the attacks of the Northmen, he planned and directed the strengthening of the defences, though he also relied for security on the merits of the relics of St Germain and St Genevieve. When the attack finally came (885), the defence of the city was entrusted to him and to Odo, Count of Paris, and Hugh the Abbot.

The city was attacked on 26 November and the struggle for the possession of the bridge (now the Pont-au-Change) lasted for two days; but Joscelin repaired the destruction of the wooden tower overnight, and the Vikings were obliged to give up the attempt to take the city by storm. The Siege of Paris lasted for about a year longer, while the emperor Charles the Fat was in Italy. Joscelin died soon after the preliminaries of the peace had been agreed on, worn out by his exertions, or killed by a pestilence which raged in the city. He was succeeded by Askericus.

== Sources ==
- Duval, Amaury. L'Evéque Gozlin ou le siege de Paris par les Normands, chronique du IX siècle. Paris, 1832.
- MacLean, Simon. Kingship and Politics in the Late Ninth Century: Charles the Fat and the end of the Carolingian Empire. Cambridge University Press: 2003.
