= Deutsches Archiv für Erforschung des Mittelalters =

German historical journal

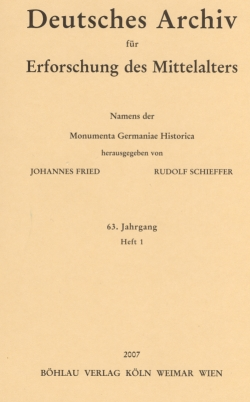
Cover of the historical journal “Deutsches Archiv” of issue 1 from 2007 (Volume 63)

The Deutsches Archiv für Erforschung des Mittelalters (German Archive for Research into the Middle Ages; often shortened to Deutsches Archiv or DA) is a historical journal on history between 400 CE and 1500 CE, published by the Monumenta Germaniae Historica (MGH), the German institute for study of the Middle Ages. It numbers its volumes from 1937, named the Deutsches Archiv für Geschichte des Mittelalters (German Archive for Medieval History) from volume 7 (1944). Its forerunners were the twelve-volume 1820-1874 Archiv der Gesellschaft für ältere deutsche Geschichtskunde (Archive for study of earlier German history) and the fifty-volume 1876-1935 Neues Archiv der Gesellschaft für ältere deutsche Geschichtskunde (New Archive for the study of earlier German history or NA). It has been published in Weimar then Cologne by Böhlau Verlag, its current publisher, and is the oldest German-language journal on medieval history.
