= Otto, Duke of Lorraine =

Count of Verdun, Duke of Lorraine

Otto (died 944), son of Count Ricwin and a Liudolfing, was the Count of Verdun by inheritance and the Duke of Lorraine by appointment. Otto I, Holy Roman Emperor appointed him to Duke. Otto was a relative of the emperor, hence both his name and his appointment to high office. He is sometimes referred to as Otto I because another Otto later ruled over Lower Lorraine.

Sometime between 940 and 942, Otto was appointed duke and given the guardianship over Henry, son of Gilbert, the first duke of Lorraine. He died not long afterward, and his ward Henry died soon after that.

== Sources ==
- Bernhardt, John W. Itinerant Kingship and Royal Monasteries in Early Medieval Germany, c. 936–1075. Cambridge: Cambridge University Press, 1993.

Preceded by Henry	Duke of Lorraine; 940/2–944	Succeeded by Conrad I
