= Charles the Bald =

King of West Francia from 843 to 877 and Carolingian Emperor from 875 to 877

- Emperor of the Romans
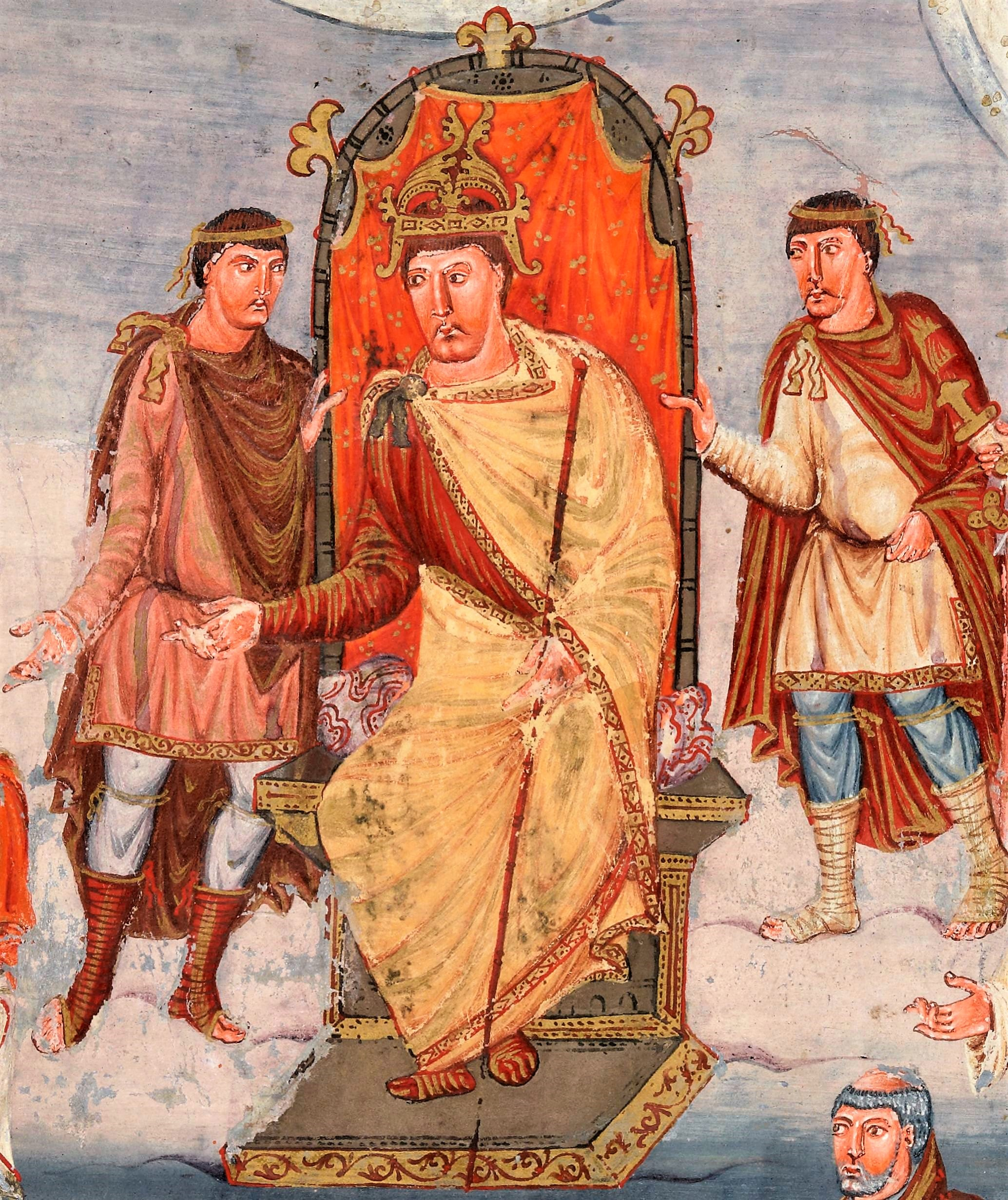
- Charles the Bald as depicted in the Vivian Bible, c. 845

Emperor of the Carolingian Empire
- Reign: 875 – 6 October 877
- Coronation: 25 December 875, Pavia
- Predecessor: Louis II of Italy
- Successor: Charles the Fat

King of West Francia
- Reign: c. 10 August 843 – 6 October 877
- Predecessor: Louis the Pious
- Successor: Louis the Stammerer
- Rival: Louis the German (858–859)
- Born: 13 June 823; Frankfurt, Francia
- Died: 6 October 877 (aged 54); Brides-les-Bains, West Francia
- Burial: Abbey of Saint-Denis
- Spouses: Ermentrude of Orleans; Richilde of Provence
- Issue: Judith of Flanders; Louis the Stammerer; Charles the Child; Lothar the Lame; Carloman; Rothilde
- House: Carolingian
- Father: Louis the Pious
- Mother: Judith of Bavaria

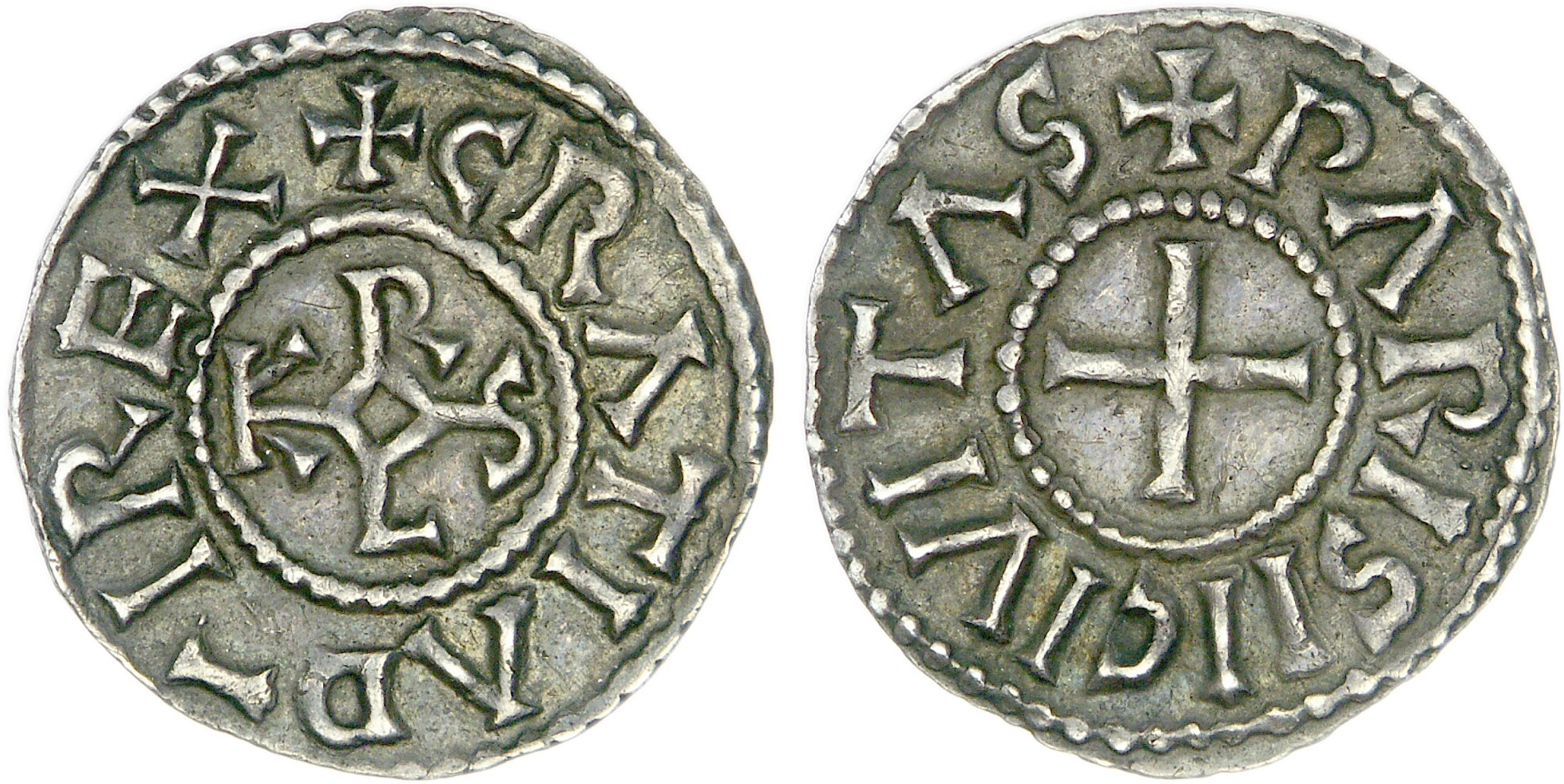
Denier of Charles the Bald struck at Paris

Charles the Bald (French: Charles le Chauve; 13 June 823 – 6 October 877) was king of West Francia (843–77), king of Italy (875–77) and emperor of the Carolingian Empire (875–77). After a series of civil wars during the reign of his father, Louis the Pious, Charles succeeded, by the Treaty of Verdun (843), in acquiring the western third of the empire. He was a grandson of Charlemagne and the youngest son of Louis the Pious by his second wife, Judith.

== Struggle against his brothers ==
Kingdoms of Charles the Bald (orange) and other Carolingians in 876

He was born on 13 June 823 in Frankfurt, when his elder brothers were already adults and had been assigned their own regna, or subkingdoms, by their father. The attempts made by Louis the Pious to assign Charles a subkingdom, first Alemannia and then the country between the Meuse and the Pyrenees (in 832, after the rising of Pepin I of Aquitaine) were unsuccessful. The numerous reconciliations with the rebellious Lothair and Pepin, as well as their brother Louis the German, King of Bavaria, made Charles' share in Aquitaine and Italy only temporary, but his father did not give up and made Charles the heir of the entire land which was once Gaul. At a diet in Aachen in 837, Louis the Pious bade the nobles do homage to Charles as his heir. Pepin of Aquitaine died in 838, whereupon Charles at last received that kingdom, which angered Pepin's heirs and the Aquitainian nobles.

The death of the emperor in 840 led to the outbreak of war between his sons. Charles allied himself with his brother Louis the German to resist the pretensions of the new Emperor Lothair I, and the two allies defeated Lothair at the Battle of Fontenoy-en-Puisaye on 25 June 841. In the following year, the two brothers confirmed their alliance by the celebrated Oaths of Strasbourg. The war was brought to an end by the Treaty of Verdun in August 843. The settlement gave Charles the Bald the kingdom of the West Franks, which he had been governing until then, and which practically corresponded with what is now France, as far as the Meuse, the Saône, and the Rhône, with the addition of the Spanish March as far as the Ebro. Louis received the eastern part of the Carolingian Empire, known then as East Francia and later as Germany. Lothair retained the imperial title and the Kingdom of Italy. He also received the central regions from Flanders through the Rhineland and Burgundy as king of Middle Francia.

== Reign in the West ==
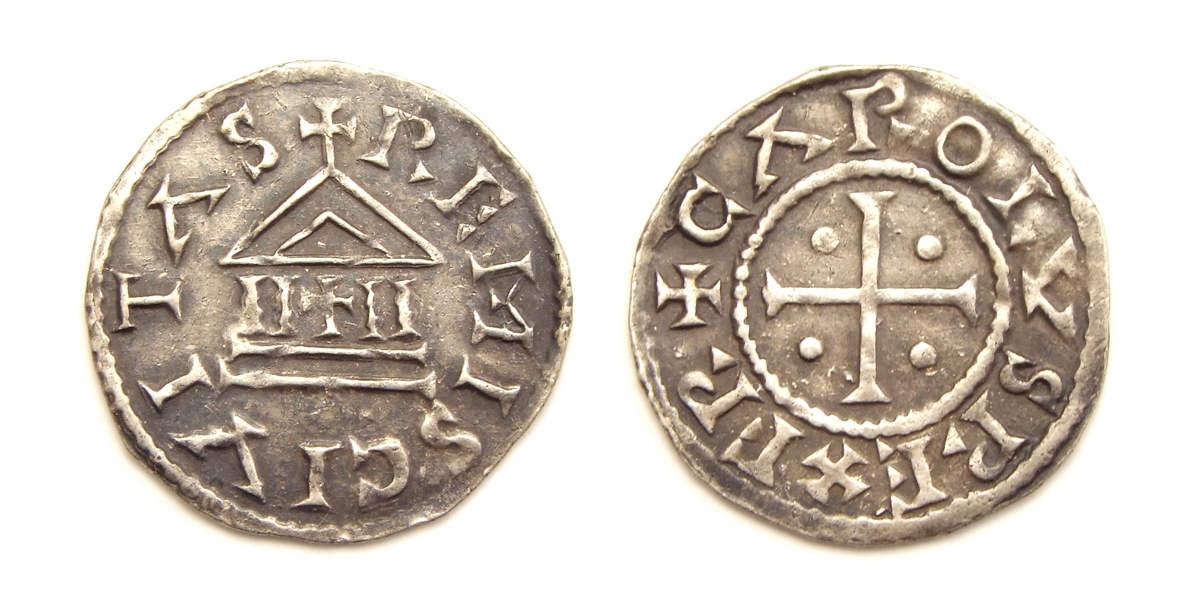
Denier (type Temple and cross) of Charles the Bald, minted at Reims between 840 and 864 (pre-Edict of Pistres)

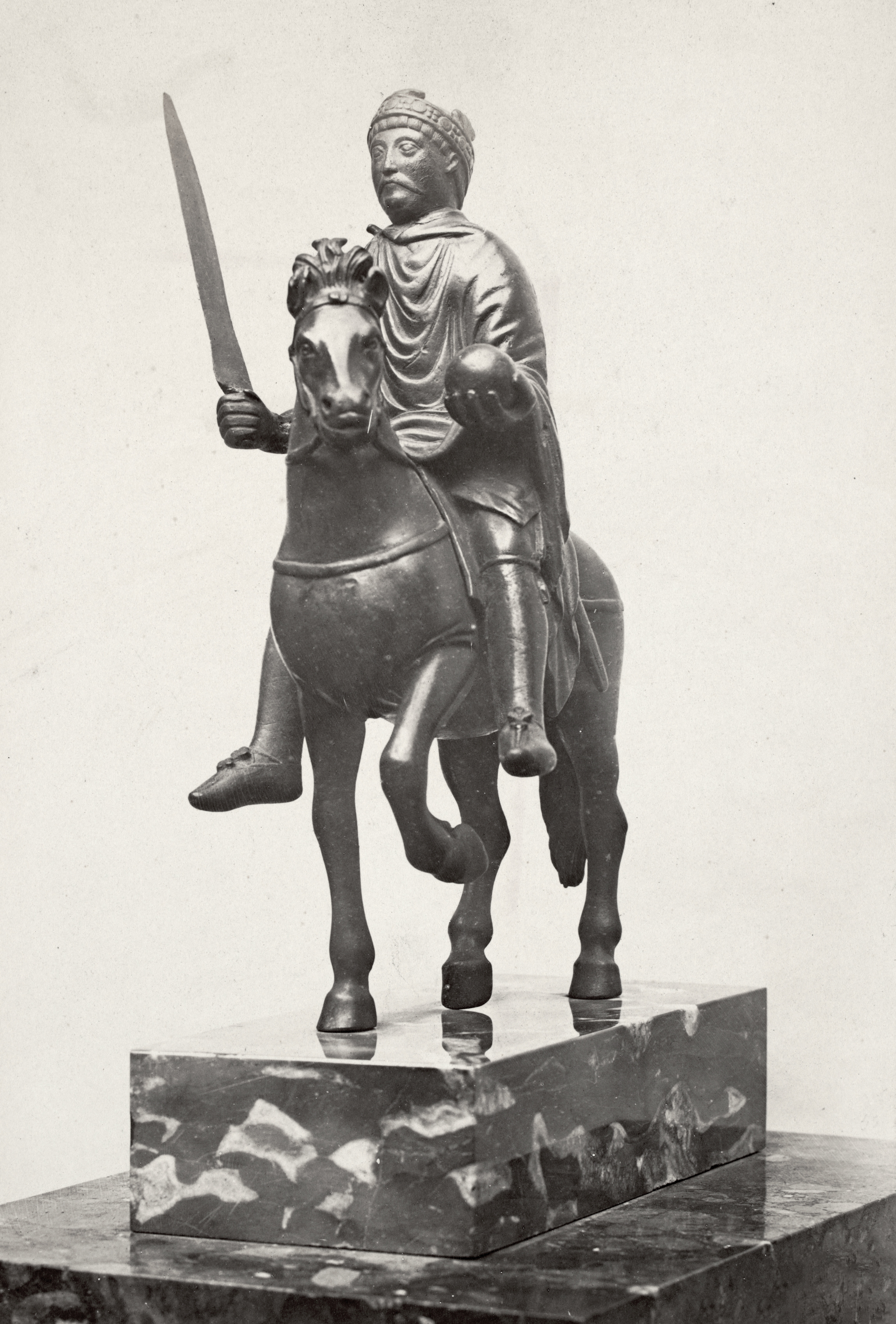
The so-called Equestrian statuette of Charlemagne (c. 870), thought to possibly depict Charles the Bald

Shortly after Verdun, Charles conducted an unsuccessful campaign against Brittany. On his return, he signed the Treaty of Coulaines with his nobility and clergy. After that, the first years of his reign, up to the death of Lothair I in 855, were comparatively peaceful. During these years the three brothers continued the system of "confraternal government", meeting repeatedly with one another, at Koblenz (848), at Meerssen (851), and at Attigny (854). In 858, Louis the German, invited by disaffected nobles eager to oust Charles, invaded the West Frankish kingdom. Charles was so unpopular that he was unable to summon an army, and he fled to Burgundy. He was saved only by the support of the bishops, who refused to crown Louis the German king, and by the fidelity of the Welfs, who were related to his mother, Judith. In 860, he in his turn tried to seize the kingdom of his nephew, Charles of Provence, but was repulsed. On the death of his nephew Lothair II in 869, Charles tried to seize Lothair's dominions by having himself consecrated as King of Lotharingia at Metz, but he was compelled to open negotiations when Louis found support among Lothair's former vassals. Lotharingia was partitioned between Charles and Louis in the resulting treaty (870).

Besides these family disputes, Charles had to struggle against repeated rebellions in Aquitaine and against the Bretons. Led by their chiefs Nomenoë and Erispoë, who defeated the king at the Battle of Ballon (845) and the Battle of Jengland (851), the Bretons were successful in obtaining a de facto independence. Charles also fought against the Vikings, who devastated the country of the north, the valleys of the Seine and Loire, and even up to the borders of Aquitaine. At the Vikings' successful siege and sack of Paris in 845 and several times thereafter Charles was forced to purchase their retreat at a heavy price. Charles led various expeditions against the invaders and, by the Edict of Pistres of 864, made the army more mobile by providing for a cavalry element, the predecessor of the French chivalry so famous during the next 600 years. By the same edict, he ordered fortified bridges to be put up at all rivers to block the Viking incursions. Two of these bridges at Paris saved the city during its siege of 885–886. Charles engaged in diplomacy with the Emirate of Cordoba, receiving camels from Emir Muhammad I in 865. From the 860s, the palace of Compiègne became an increasingly important centre for Charles and he founded a monastery there in 876. In the tenth century Compiègne was known as 'Carlopolis' because of its association with Charles.

In 871–872, Charles sent two letters to Pope Hadrian II where he made a defence of royal sovereignty in the face of intrusive actions by the papacy into state affairs.

== Reign as emperor ==
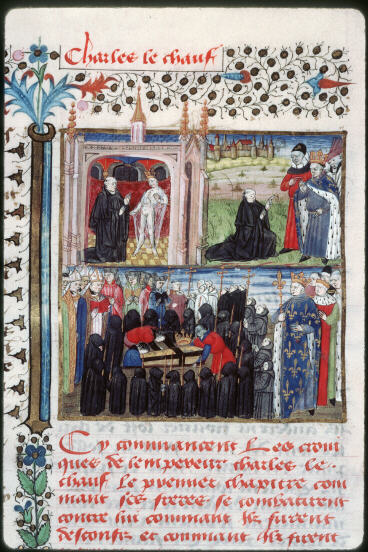
Apparition of Charles the Bald after his death and burial in Saint Denis

In 875, after the death of the Emperor Louis II (son of his half-brother Lothair), Charles the Bald, supported by Pope John VIII, traveled to Italy, receiving the royal crown at Pavia and the imperial insignia in Rome on 25 December. As emperor, Charles combined the mottoes that had been used by his grandfather and father into a single formula: renovatio imperii Romani et Francorum, "renewal of the empire of the Romans and Franks". These words appeared on his seal.

Louis the German, also a candidate for the succession of Louis II, revenged himself by invading and devastating Charles's domains, and Charles had to return hastily to West Francia. After the death of Louis the German (28 August 876), Charles in his turn attempted to seize Louis's kingdom, but was decisively beaten at the Battle of Andernach on 8 October 876.

In the meantime, Pope John VIII, menaced by the Saracens, was urging Charles to come to his defence in Italy. Charles again crossed the Alps, but this expedition was received with little enthusiasm by the nobles, and even by his regent in Lombardy, Boso, and they refused to join his army. At the same time Carloman, son of Louis the German, entered northern Italy. Charles, ill and in great distress, started on his way back to Gaul, but died while crossing the pass of Mont Cenis at Brides-les-Bains, on 6 October 877.

== Burial and succession ==
According to the Annals of St-Bertin, Charles was hastily buried at the abbey of Nantua, Burgundy, because the bearers were unable to withstand the stench of his decaying body. A few years later, his remains were transferred to the Abbey of Saint-Denis where he had long wished to be buried, in a porphyry tub which may be the same one known as "Dagobert's tub" (cuve de Dagobert), now in the Louvre. It was recorded that there was a memorial brass there that was melted down at the Revolution.

Charles was succeeded by his son, Louis. Charles was a prince of education and letters, a friend of the church, and conscious of the support he could find in the episcopate against his unruly nobles, for he chose his councillors from among the higher clergy, as in the case of Guenelon of Sens, who betrayed him, and of Hincmar of Reims.

== Baldness ==
It has been suggested that Charles's nickname was used ironically and not descriptively; he was not in fact bald but rather was extremely hairy. An alternative or additional interpretation is based on Charles's initial lack of a regnum. "Bald" would in this case be a tongue-in-cheek reference to his landlessness at an age at which his brothers already had been sub-kings for some years.

Contemporary depictions of his person, such as in his Bible of 845, on his seal of 847 (as king) and on his seal of 875 (as emperor), show him with a full head of hair, as does the equestrian statuette (c. 870), which is thought to depict him.

The Genealogy of Frankish Kings, a text from Fontanelle dating from possibly as early as 869, names him as Karolus Calvus ("Charles the Bald"), and he is given the same name in the late tenth century by Richier of Reims and Adhemar of Chabannes.

== Marriages and children ==
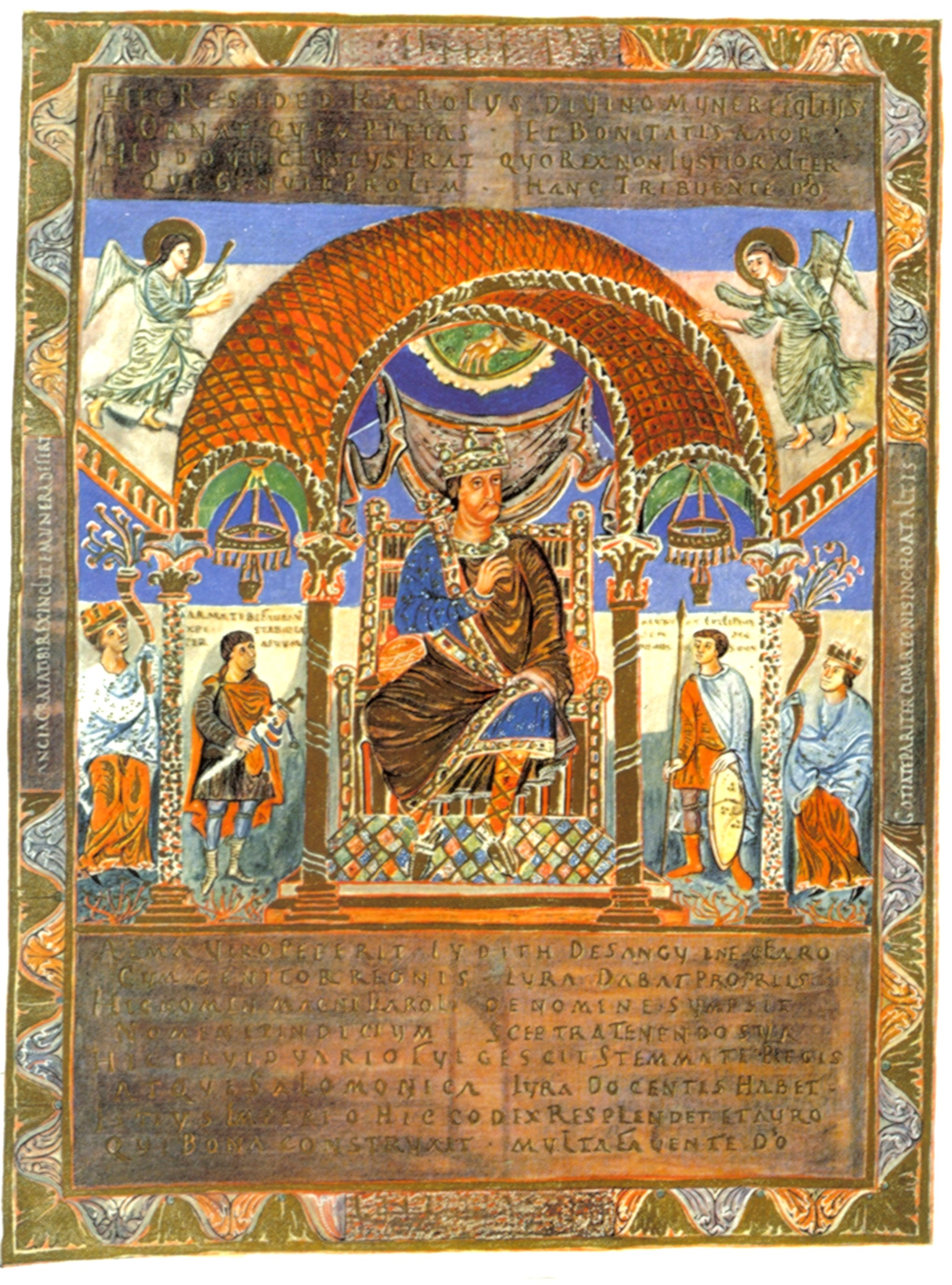
Throne portrait of Charles the Bald from the Codex Aureus, commissioned around 1000 by Emperor Henry II at the scriptorium of Saint Emmeram's Abbey, Regensburg

Charles married Ermentrude, daughter of Odo I, Count of Orléans, in 842. She died in 869. In 870, Charles married Richilde of Provence, who was descended from a noble family of Lorraine.

With Ermentrude:

- Judith (c. 843 – after 866), married first King Ethelwulf of Wessex, second his son King Ethelbald, and third Baldwin I, Margrave of Flanders
- Louis the Stammerer (846–879)
- Charles the Child (847–866)
- Lothair the Lame (848–866), monk in 861, became Abbot of Saint-Germain
- Carloman (849–876)
- Rotrude (852–912), a nun, Abbess of Saint-Radegunde
- Ermentrud (854–877), a nun, Abbess of Hasnon
- Hildegarde (born 856, died young)
- Gisela (857–874)
- Godehilde (864–907)

With Richilde:

- Rothilde (871–929), married firstly to Hugues, Count of Bourges and secondly to Roger, Count of Maine.
- Drogo (872–873)
- Pippin (873–874)
- a son (born and died 875)
- Charles (876–877)

== See also ==
- First Bible of Charles the Bald
- Crown of Charlemagne
- Capitularies of Charles the Bald
- Engelram, Chamberlain of France

== Notes ==
Emperor Charles II the Bald Carolingian dynasty Born: 13 June 823 Died: 6 October 877
Regnal titles
Preceded by Pepin I	— DISPUTED — King of Aquitaine; 838–855; Disputed by Pepin II	Succeeded by Charles the Child
Preceded by Pepin I	Duke of Maine; 838–851	Succeeded by Robert the Strong
Preceded by Louis the Pious as king of the Franks	King of West Francia; 843–877	Succeeded by Louis the Stammerer
Preceded by Louis the Younger	Carolingian emperor 875–877	Vacant Title next held by Charles the Fat
Preceded by Louis the Younger	King of Italy; 875–877	Succeeded by Carloman
