= Counts of Meaux =

Counts who reigned over the county of Meaux include:

== Counts of Meaux ==
- c. 750: Helmgaud.
- 787: Richard, appeared in an inventory of Abbey of Saint Wandrille after the death of abbot Witlaic.
- 799–813: Helmgaud II, son of Gauzhelm, son of Helmgaud I. He was a Charlemagne's missi dominici alongside the bishop Jesse of Amiens; he notably attended the coronation of Charlemagne (according to Royal Frankish Annals in 799) and was sent in 802 as an embassy to Michael I Rangabe in about 812-813
- 862–877: Louis the Stammerer (born 879), a king of France (877-879)
- ?-886: Thibert, or Teutbert, count of Madrie, son or grandson of Nivelon. His daughter marries Pepin I of Aquitaine
- 886–888: Thibert, or Teutbert, or Tetbert (born 888), killed in Rouen, brother of Anscharic a bishop of Paris
- 888–902: Herbert I, Count of Vermandois (born 902), a count of Vermandois
- 902–943: Herbert II de Vermandois (born 943), count of Vermandois, son of the preceding, marries Adèle, daughter of Robert I of France, king of France.
- 943–966: Robert of Vermandois (c. 907 – c. 967/8), count of Meaux and Troyes (956-967), son of the preceding. Marries Adélaïde Werra, countess of Troyes, daughter of Gilbert de Chalon, main count of Burgundy.
- 967–995: Herbert of Vermandois, count of Meaux and Troyes, son of the preceding.
- 995–1022: Stephen I of Troyes, count of Meaux and Troyes, son of the preceding
- 1022-1037: Odo II, Count of Blois (983–1037), count of Blois, of Reims, Meaux and Troyes, cousin of the preceding, descendant of Herbert II, count of Vermandois. Marries firstly in 1103 Mathilde de Normandie (born 1006), secondly Ermengearde d'Auvergne
- 1037–1047: Stephen II (born 1047), count of Meaux and Troyes, son of the preceding and Ermengearde d'Auvergne.
- 1047–1066: Odo II of Troyes (born 1115), count of Meaux and Troyes, son of the preceding. He accompanies William the Conqueror and settles in England. His uncle then took over his Champagne estates.
- 1066–1089: Thibaut I (1019–1089), count of Blois, Meaux and Troyes, uncle of the preceding, son of Odo I and Ermengearde d'Auvergne. Marries firstly Gersende du Maine, secondly Adele of Valois.
- 1089–1102: Stephen (born 1102), count of Blois and Meaux, son of Theobald I and Gersende du Maine. Marries Adela of Normandy.
- 1102–1151: Theobald II, (born 1152), count of Blois and Meaux, count of Champagne in 1125, son of the preceding.

== Viscounts of Meaux ==
The counts of Meaux were assisted by the viscounts of Meaux, at least since 1081/1098.

They were also Lords of La Ferté-Ancoul/-sous-Jouarre, and from the end of the 11th century until the Revolution, the viscounts were descended from the old masters of La Ferté-sous-Jouarre: the families of La Ferté-Ancoul, then Oisy (Simon), of Montmirail (Jean de Montmirail and his daughter Marie; they had also Condé, long associated with La Ferté-Ancoul and Meaux), Coucy (Enguerrand III; Enguerrand V), of Béthune-Locres, Bar (Robert of Marle and his daughter Jeanne), of Luxembourg-Saint-Pol (Louis and his granddaughter Marie), of Bourbon-Vendôme (Charles, duke of Vendôme and the grandfather of the King Henri IV) then Bourbon-Condé (Louis).

And then on 13 August 1627 Henri II of Condé (1588-1646, 26th Viscount of Meaux) yields the viscount (épicène at the time) to Maximilien de Béthune, Duke of Sully, from Béthune-Locres. The valuation was very low, 15,000 livres only (except if it concerns the income and not the capital of the viscount).

The latter leaves it to his youngest son François, duke of Orval (1602-1678, brother of Maximilien II) and to his grandson Philippe (born August 1682, son of François, he is said to have ceded the viscount during his lifetime to his first cousin Maximilien III), then to Maximilien II, dukes of Sully, Maximilien III François (1615-1662), Maximilien IV Pierre (1640-1694), Maximilien V Pierre-François-Nicolas (1664-1712), Maximilien VI Henri (1669-1729, without offspring, vacant at his death), Maximilien VIII Antoine-Armand of Orval (1730-1786, known as viscount of Meaux "since his birth" father of Maximilien IX Alexis (1750-1776) and Maximilien X Gabriel-Louis (1756-1800)).
