= May 10 =

May 10 this year in various calendars
- Sunday, 10 May 2026
Akan	Monokwasi
Armenian	24 Mareri 1475
Aztec	Xocotlhuetzi 20, 4 Tōchtli
Babylonian	22 Nisanu, 2337 SE
Balinese pawukon	Menga, Kajeng, Menala, Paing, Maulu, Redite of Gumbreg, Yama, Erangan, Sri
Bengali	27 Boisakh, BS 1433
Chinese	Yang Wood Monkey・Emptiness Mansion; Fire Horse Year, Month 3, Day 24 (Lixia, 11 days until Xiaoman)
Common Era	10 May 2026 CE
Coptic	2 Pashons, AM 1742
Egyptian	24 Thoth, 2775 NE
Ethiopian	2 Genbot, 2018 Amätä Məhrät
French Republican	Décade III, Primidi de Floréal de l'Année 234 de la République
Gregorian	10 May, AD 2026
Hebrew	23 Iyar, AM 5786; Omer 38
Hindu	Dhaniṣṭhā・Brahman; Solar: 27 Vaiśākha, 1948 SE; Lunisolar: Aṣṭamī, Kṛishna pakṣa of Vaiśākha, 2083 VE; Rāudra・5127 KY・1,872,705
Icelandic	Sunnudagur, 18 Harpa 2026
Islamic	23 Dhu al-Qi'dah, AH 1447 (using tabular method)
ISO week date	2026-W19-7
Japanese	24 Yayoi, Reiwa 8 (Rikka, 11 days until Shōman)
Julian	27 April, AD 2026 (AM 7534)
Julian day	2461171
Korean	24 Yongdal, 4359 DE
Maya	13.0.13.10.8; 1 Zip, 4 Lamat
Roman	ante diem V Kalendas Maias, MMDCCLXXIX AUC
Solar Hijri	20 Ordibehesht, SH 1405
Tibetan	23 nag pa, me pho rta 2153 or 1772 or 1000

<<	May					>>
Su	Mo	Tu	We	Th	Fr	Sa
					1	2
3	4	5	6	7	8	9
10	11	12	13	14	15	16
17	18	19	20	21	22	23
24	25	26	27	28	29	30
31
2026

May 10 in recent years
2026 (Sunday)
2025 (Saturday)
2024 (Friday)
2023 (Wednesday)
2022 (Tuesday)
2021 (Monday)
2020 (Sunday)
2019 (Friday)
2018 (Thursday)
2017 (Wednesday)

May 10 is the 130th day of the year (131st in leap years) in the Gregorian calendar; 235 days remain until the end of the year.

== Events ==
=== Pre-1600 ===
- 28 BC – A sunspot is observed by Han dynasty astronomers during the reign of Emperor Cheng of Han, one of the earliest dated sunspot observations in China.
- 946 – Alberic II of Spoleto arranges the election of pope Agapetus II following the death of Pope Marinus II.
- 1291 – Scottish nobles recognize the authority of Edward I of England pending the selection of a king.
- 1294 – Temür, Khagan of the Mongols, is enthroned as Emperor of the Yuan dynasty.
- 1497 – Amerigo Vespucci allegedly leaves Cádiz for his first voyage to the New World.
- 1503 – Christopher Columbus visits the Cayman Islands and names them Las Tortugas after the numerous turtles there.
- 1534 – Jacques Cartier visits Newfoundland.
- 1591 – Elizabeth I is entertained by the Hermit's Welcome at Theobalds.

=== 1601–1900 ===
- 1688 – King Narai nominates Phetracha as regent, leading to the revolution of 1688 in which Phetracha becomes king of the Ayutthaya Kingdom.
- 1713 – Great Northern War: The Russian Navy led by Admiral Fyodor Apraksin land both at Katajanokka and Hietalahti during the Battle of Helsinki.
- 1768 – Rioting occurs in London after John Wilkes is imprisoned for writing an article for The North Briton severely criticising King George III.
- 1773 – The Parliament of Great Britain passes the Tea Act, designed to save the British East India Company by reducing taxes on its tea and granting it the right to sell tea directly to North America. The legislation leads to the Boston Tea Party.
- 1774 – Louis XVI and Marie Antoinette become King and Queen of France.
- 1775 – American Revolutionary War: A small Colonial militia led by Ethan Allen and Colonel Benedict Arnold captures Fort Ticonderoga.
- 1775 – American Revolutionary War: The Second Continental Congress takes place in Philadelphia.
- 1796 – War of the First Coalition: Napoleon wins a victory against Austrian forces at Lodi bridge over the Adda River in Italy. The Austrians lose some 2,000 men.
- 1801 – First Barbary War: The Barbary pirates of Tripoli declare war on the United States of America.
- 1824 – The National Gallery in London opens to the public.
- 1833 – A revolt broke out in southern Vietnam against Emperor Minh Mang, who had desecrated the deceased mandarin Le Van Duyet.
- 1837 – Panic of 1837: New York City banks suspend the payment of specie, triggering a national banking crisis and an economic depression whose severity was not surpassed until the Great Depression.
- 1849 – Astor Place Riot: A riot breaks out at the Astor Opera House in Manhattan, New York City over a dispute between actors Edwin Forrest and William Charles Macready, killing at least 22 and injuring over 120.
- 1857 – Indian Rebellion of 1857: In India, the first war of Independence begins. Sepoys mutiny against their commanding officers at Meerut.
- 1865 – American Civil War: In Kentucky, Union soldiers ambush and mortally wound Confederate raider William Quantrill, who lingers until his death on June 6.
- 1869 – The First transcontinental railroad, linking the eastern and western United States, is completed at Promontory Summit, Utah Territory with the golden spike.
- 1872 – Victoria Woodhull becomes the first woman nominated for President of the United States.
- 1876 – The Centennial Exposition is opened in Philadelphia.
- 1881 – Carol I is crowned the King of the Romanian Kingdom.
- 1899 – Finnish farmworker Karl Emil Malmelin kills seven people with an axe at the Simola croft in the village of Klaukkala.

=== 1901–present ===
- 1904 – The Horch & Cir. Motorwagenwerke AG is founded. It would eventually become the Audi company.
- 1908 – Mother's Day is observed for the first time in the United States, in Grafton, West Virginia.
- 1916 – Sailing in the lifeboat James Caird, Ernest Shackleton arrives at South Georgia after a journey of 800 nautical miles from Elephant Island.
- 1922 – The United States annexes the Kingman Reef.
- 1924 – J. Edgar Hoover is appointed first Director of the United States' Federal Bureau of Investigation (FBI), and remains so until his death in 1972.
- 1933 – Censorship: In Germany, the Nazis stage massive public book burnings.
- 1940 – World War II: German fighters accidentally bomb the German city of Freiburg.
- 1940 – World War II: Winston Churchill is appointed Prime Minister of the United Kingdom following the resignation of Neville Chamberlain. On the same day, Germany invades France, The Netherlands, Belgium and Luxembourg. Meanwhile, the United Kingdom occupies Iceland.
- 1941 – World War II: The House of Commons in London is damaged by the Luftwaffe in an air raid.
- 1941 – World War II: Rudolf Hess parachutes into Scotland to try to negotiate a peace deal between the United Kingdom and Nazi Germany.
- 1942 – World War II: The Thai Phayap Army invades the Shan States during the Burma Campaign.
- 1946 – First successful launch of an American V-2 rocket at White Sands Proving Ground.
- 1961 – Air France Flight 406 is destroyed by a bomb over the Sahara, killing 78.
- 1962 – Marvel Comics publishes the first issue of The Incredible Hulk.
- 1967 – The Northrop M2-F2 crashes on landing, becoming the inspiration for the novel Cyborg and TV series The Six Million Dollar Man.
- 1969 – Vietnam War: The Battle of Dong Ap Bia begins with an assault on Hill 937. It will ultimately become known as Hamburger Hill.
- 1975 – Sony introduces the Betamax videocassette recorder.
- 1993 – In Thailand, a fire at the Kader Toy Factory kills over 200 workers.
- 1994 – Nelson Mandela is inaugurated as South Africa's first black president.
- 1996 – A blizzard strikes Mount Everest, killing eight climbers by the next day.
- 1997 – The 7.3 M_{w} Qayen earthquake strikes Iran's Khorasan Province killing 1,567 people.
- 2002 – FBI agent Robert Hanssen is sentenced to life imprisonment without the possibility of parole for selling United States secrets to Russia for $1.4 million in cash and diamonds.
- 2005 – A hand grenade thrown by Vladimir Arutyunian lands about 20 m from U.S. President George W. Bush while he is giving a speech to a crowd in Tbilisi, Georgia, but it malfunctions and does not detonate.
- 2012 – The Damascus bombings are carried out using a pair of car bombs detonated by suicide bombers outside a military intelligence complex in Damascus, Syria, killing 55 people.
- 2013 – One World Trade Center becomes the tallest building in the Western Hemisphere.
- 2017 – Syrian civil war: The Syrian Democratic Forces (SDF) capture the last footholds of the Islamic State of Iraq and the Levant (ISIL) in Al-Tabqah, bringing the Battle of Tabqa to an end.
- 2022 – Queen Elizabeth II misses the State Opening of Parliament for the first time in 59 years. It was the first time that a new session of Parliament was opened by the Prince of Wales and the Duke of Cambridge acting as Counsellors of State.
- 2024 – Start of the May 2024 solar storms, the most powerful set of geomagnetic storms since the 2003 Halloween solar storms.

== Births ==
=== Pre-1600 ===
- 874 – Meng Zhixiang, Chinese general and emperor (died 934)
- 955 – Al-Aziz Billah, Fatimid caliph (died 996)
- 1491 – Suzanne, Duchess of Bourbon (died 1521)

=== 1601–1900 ===
- 1604 – Jean Mairet, French author and playwright (died 1686)
- 1697 – Jean-Marie Leclair, French violinist and composer (died 1764)
- 1727 – Anne-Robert-Jacques Turgot, Baron de Laune, French economist and politician (died 1781)
- 1755 – Robert Gray, American captain and explorer (died 1806)
- 1760 – Johann Peter Hebel, German author and poet (died 1826)
- 1760 – Claude Joseph Rouget de Lisle, French captain, engineer, and composer (died 1836)
- 1770 – Louis-Nicolas Davout, French general and politician, French Minister of War (died 1823)
- 1788 – Augustin-Jean Fresnel, French physicist and engineer (died 1827)
- 1793 – R. E. B. Baylor, American politician and jurist (died 1873)
- 1812 – William Henry Barlow, English engineer (died 1902)
- 1813 – Montgomery Blair, American lieutenant and politician, 20th United States Postmaster General (died 1883)
- 1838 – John Wilkes Booth, American actor, assassin of Abraham Lincoln (died 1865)
- 1841 – James Gordon Bennett Jr., American publisher and broadcaster (died 1918)
- 1843 – Benito Pérez Galdós, Spanish author and playwright (died 1920)
- 1847 – Wilhelm Killing, German mathematician and academic (died 1923)
- 1855 – Yukteswar Giri, Indian guru and educator (died 1936)
- 1872 – Marcel Mauss, French sociologist and anthropologist (died 1950)
- 1876 – Ivan Cankar, Slovenian poet and playwright (died 1918)
- 1878 – Konstantinos Parthenis, Greek painter (died 1967)
- 1878 – Gustav Stresemann, German journalist and politician, Chancellor of Germany, Nobel Prize laureate (died 1929)
- 1879 – Symon Petliura, Ukrainian journalist and politician (died 1926)
- 1886 – Karl Barth, Swiss theologian and author (died 1968)
- 1886 – Olaf Stapledon, English novelist and philosopher (died 1950)
- 1886 – Felix Manalo, Filipino minister and founder of the indigenous sect Iglesia ni Cristo (died 1963)
- 1888 – Max Steiner, Austrian-American composer and conductor (died 1971)
- 1890 – Alfred Jodl, German general (died 1946)
- 1891 – Mahmoud Mokhtar, Egyptian sculptor and academic (died 1934)
- 1893 – Tonita Peña, San Ildefonso Pueblo (Native American) artist (died 1949)
- 1894 – Dimitri Tiomkin, Ukrainian-American composer and conductor (died 1979)
- 1895 – Joe Murphy, (Irish-American), died during the 1920 Cork hunger strike (died 1920)
- 1897 – Einar Gerhardsen, Norwegian politician, Prime Minister of Norway (died 1987)
- 1898 – Ariel Durant, American historian and author (died 1981)
- 1899 – Fred Astaire, American actor, singer, and dancer (died 1987)
- 1900 – Cecilia Payne-Gaposchkin, English-American astronomer and astrophysicist (died 1979)

=== 1901–present ===
- 1901 – John Desmond Bernal, Irish-English crystallographer and physicist (died 1971)
- 1902 – David O. Selznick, American producer and screenwriter (died 1965)
- 1903 – Otto Bradfisch, German economist, jurist, and SS officer (died 1994)
- 1904 – Frieda Belinfante, Dutch musician and LGBT member of the Dutch resistance (died 1995)
- 1905 – Alex Schomburg, Puerto Rican artist and illustrator (died 1998)
- 1908 – Carl Albert, American lawyer and politician, 54th Speaker of the United States House of Representatives (died 2000)
- 1909 – Maybelle Carter, American autoharp player (died 1978)
- 1915 – Denis Thatcher, English businessman, Spouse of the Prime Minister of the United Kingdom (died 2003)
- 1919 – Ella T. Grasso, Governor of Connecticut (died 1981)
- 1920 – Bert Weedon, English guitarist (died 2012)
- 1922 – David Azrieli, Polish-Canadian businessman and philanthropist (died 2014)
- 1922 – Nancy Walker, American actress, singer, and director (died 1992)
- 1923 – Heydar Aliyev, Azerbaijan general and politician, President of Azerbaijan (died 2003)
- 1926 – Hugo Banzer, Bolivian general and politician, President of Bolivia (died 2002)
- 1928 – Arnold Rüütel, Estonian agronomist and politician, President of Estonia (died 2024)
- 1928 – Lothar Schmid, German chess player (died 2013)
- 1928 – Denyse Émond, Canadian actress and comedian (died 2026)
- 1929 – George Coe, American actor and producer (died 2015)
- 1929 – Antonine Maillet, Canadian writer and scholar (died 2025)
- 1930 – George E. Smith, American physicist and engineer, Nobel Prize laureate (died 2025)
- 1931 – Ettore Scola, Italian director and screenwriter (died 2016)
- 1933 – Barbara Taylor Bradford, British novelist (died 2024)
- 1935 – Larry Williams, American singer-songwriter, pianist, and producer (died 1980)
- 1938 – Manuel Santana, Spanish tennis player (died 2021)
- 1940 – Arthur Alexander, American country-soul singer-songwriter (died 1993)
- 1942 – Jim Calhoun, American basketball player and coach
- 1943 – Raquel Blandón, Guatemalan lawyer and activist, First Lady of Guatemala (died 2024)
- 1943 – Judith Jamison, American dancer and choreographer (died 2024)
- 1944 – Marie-France Pisier, French actress, director, and screenwriter (died 2011)
- 1946 – Donovan, Scottish singer-songwriter
- 1946 – Biruté Galdikas, Canadian primatologist and conservationist (died 2026)
- 1946 – Graham Gouldman, English guitarist and songwriter
- 1946 – Dave Mason, English singer-songwriter and guitarist (died 2026)
- 1949 – Miuccia Prada, Italian fashion designer
- 1952 – Sly Dunbar, Jamaican musician (died 2026)
- 1954 – Mike Hagerty, American actor (died 2022)
- 1955 – Chris Berman, American sportscaster
- 1955 – Mark David Chapman, American murderer
- 1956 – Mickey Faerch, Danish-Canadian burlesque dancer and actress
- 1956 – Vladislav Listyev, Russian journalist (died 1995)
- 1957 – Sid Vicious, English singer and bass player (died 1979)
- 1958 – Rick Santorum, American lawyer and politician, United States Senator from Pennsylvania
- 1959 – Victoria Rowell, American actress
- 1959 – Cindy Hyde-Smith, American politician, United States Senator from Mississippi
- 1960 – Bono, Irish singer-songwriter, musician and activist
- 1960 – Dean Heller, American lawyer and politician, United States Senator from Nevada
- 1960 – Kerry Hemsley, Australian rugby league player
- 1960 – Merlene Ottey, Jamaican-Slovenian runner
- 1962 – Robby Thompson, American baseball player and coach
- 1963 – Lisa Nowak, American commander and astronaut
- 1965 – Linda Evangelista, Canadian model
- 1965 – Greg Fasala, Australian swimmer
- 1965 – Paul Langmack, Australian rugby league player and coach (died 2026)
- 1966 – Jonathan Edwards, English triple jumper
- 1967 – Eion Crossan, New Zealand rugby player
- 1968 – Al Murray, English comedian and television host
- 1968 – William Regal, English wrestler
- 1969 – Dennis Bergkamp, Dutch footballer and manager
- 1969 – John Scalzi, American author and blogger
- 1970 – David Weir, Scottish footballer
- 1974 – Sylvain Wiltord, French footballer
- 1975 – Hazem Emam, Egyptian footballer and politician
- 1975 – Hélio Castroneves, Brazilian race car driver
- 1975 – Ueli Kestenholz, Swiss snowboarder (died 2026)
- 1977 – Adrian Morley, English rugby league player
- 1978 – Kenan Thompson, American actor and comedian
- 1981 – Humberto Suazo, Chilean footballer
- 1982 – Adebayo Akinfenwa, English footballer
- 1984 – Edward Mujica, Venezuelan baseball player
- 1985 – Ryan Getzlaf, Canadian ice hockey player
- 1985 – Farah Jacquet, Belgian politician
- 1985 – Jon Schofield, English canoe racer
- 1988 – Adam Lallana, English footballer
- 1990 – Salvador Pérez, Venezuelan baseball player
- 1990 – Ivana Španović, Serbian long jumper
- 1993 – Jake Zyrus, Filipino singer
- 1995 – Andrew Anderson, American bowler
- 1995 – Missy Franklin, American swimmer
- 1995 – Gabriella Papadakis, French ice dancer
- 1996 – Nicolas Aubé-Kubel, Canadian ice hockey player
- 1996 – Tyus Jones, American basketball player
- 1996 – Kateřina Siniaková, Czech tennis player
- 1996 – Alex Tuch, American ice hockey player
- 1997 – Brittany Broski, American comedian and singer
- 1997 – Richarlison, Brazilian footballer
- 2000 – Bae Jin-young, South Korean singer
- 2000 ‐ Nolan Gorman, American baseball player

== Deaths ==
=== Pre-1600 ===
- 1299 – Theingapati, heir to the Pagan Kingdom
- 1403 – Katherine Swynford, widow of John of Gaunt
- 1482 – Paolo dal Pozzo Toscanelli, Italian mathematician and astronomer (born 1397)
- 1493 – Colin Campbell, 1st Earl of Argyll, Scottish politician, Lord Chancellor of Scotland (born 1433)
- 1521 – Sebastian Brant, German author (born 1457)
- 1566 – Leonhart Fuchs, German physician and botanist (born 1501)
- 1569 – John of Ávila, Spanish mystic and saint (born 1500)

=== 1601–1900 ===
- 1641 – Johan Banér, Swedish field marshal (born 1596)
- 1717 – John Hathorne, American merchant and politician (born 1641)
- 1726 – Charles Beauclerk, 1st Duke of St Albans, English soldier and politician, Lord Lieutenant of Berkshire (born 1670)
- 1774 – Louis XV, King of France (born 1710)
- 1787 – William Watson, English physician, physicist, and botanist (born 1715)
- 1794 – Élisabeth of France, French princess and youngest sibling of Louis XVI (born 1764)
- 1798 – George Vancouver, English navigator and explorer (born 1757)
- 1807 – Jean-Baptiste Donatien de Vimeur, comte de Rochambeau, French general (born 1725)
- 1818 – Paul Revere, American engraver and soldier (born 1735)
- 1829 – Thomas Young, English physician and linguist (born 1773)
- 1849 – Hokusai, Japanese painter and illustrator (born 1760)
- 1863 – Stonewall Jackson, American general (born 1824)
- 1865 – William Armstrong, American lawyer, civil servant, politician, and businessperson (born 1782)
- 1868 – Henry Bennett, American lawyer and politician (born 1808)
- 1889 – Mikhail Saltykov-Shchedrin, Russian journalist, author, and playwright (born 1826)
- 1891 – Carl Nägeli, Swiss botanist and mycologist (born 1817)
- 1891 – Peter Ward, New York politician (born 1827)
- 1897 – Andrés Bonifacio, Filipino soldier and politician, President of the Philippines (born 1863)

=== 1901–present ===
- 1910 – Stanislao Cannizzaro, Italian chemist and academic (born 1826)
- 1945 – Richard Glücks, German SS officer (born 1889)
- 1945 – Konrad Henlein, Czech soldier and politician (born 1898)
- 1950 – Belle da Costa Greene, American librarian and bibliographer (born 1883)
- 1960 – Yury Olesha, Russian author, poet, and playwright (born 1899)
- 1964 – Mikhail Larionov, Russian painter, illustrator, and set designer (born 1881)
- 1965 – Hubertus van Mook, Dutch politician, Governor-General of the Dutch East Indies (born 1894)
- 1968 – Scotty Beckett, American actor and singer (born 1929)
- 1974 – Hal Mohr, American director and cinematographer (born 1894)
- 1977 – Joan Crawford, American actress (year of birth disputed)
- 1982 – Peter Weiss, German playwright and painter (born 1916)
- 1988 – Shen Congwen, Chinese author and academic (born 1902)
- 1989 – Dominik Tatarka, Slovak writer (born 1913)
- 1990 – Walker Percy, American novelist and essayist (born 1916)
- 1994 – John Wayne Gacy, American serial killer (born 1942)
- 1999 – Shel Silverstein, American poet, author, and illustrator (born 1930)
- 2000 – Jules Deschênes, Canadian lawyer and judge (born 1923)
- 2000 – Dick Sprang, American illustrator (born 1915)
- 2001 – Sudhakarrao Naik, Indian politician, Governor of Himachal Pradesh (born 1934)
- 2002 – Kaifi Azmi, Indian poet and songwriter (born 1919)
- 2002 – Yves Robert, French actor, director, producer, and screenwriter (born 1920)
- 2003 – Milan Vukcevich, Serbian-American chemist and chess player (born 1937)
- 2006 – Soraya, Colombian-American singer-songwriter, guitarist, and producer (born 1969)
- 2008 – Leyla Gencer, Turkish soprano (born 1928)
- 2010 – Frank Frazetta, American illustrator and painter (born 1928)
- 2012 – Horst Faas, German photographer and journalist (born 1933)
- 2012 – Carroll Shelby, American race car driver and designer (born 1923)
- 2012 – Gunnar Sønsteby, Norwegian captain and author (born 1918)
- 2015 – Chris Burden, American sculptor, illustrator, and academic (born 1946)
- 2018 – David Goodall, Australian botanist and ecologist (born 1914)
- 2019 – Alfredo Pérez Rubalcaba, Spanish politician and chemist (born 1951)
- 2020 – Betty Wright, American soul singer (born 1953)
- 2021 – Pauline Tinsley, British soprano (born 1928)
- 2022 – Bob Lanier, American professional basketball player (born 1948)
- 2022 – Leonid Kravchuk, Ukrainian politician (born 1934)
- 2024 – Sam Rubin, American journalist (born 1960)
- 2024 – Jim Simons, American hedge fund manager, mathematician, and philanthropist (born 1938)

== Holidays and observances ==
- Children's Day (Maldives)
- Christian feast day:
  - Alphius, Philadelphus and Cyrinus
  - Blessed Beatrice d'Este
  - Calepodius
  - Catald
  - Comgall
  - Damien of Molokai
  - Blessed Ivan Merz
  - Job (Roman Catholic Church)
  - John of Ávila
  - Solange of Bourges
  - May 10 (Eastern Orthodox liturgics)
- Confederate Memorial Day (North Carolina and South Carolina)
- Constitution Day (Micronesia)
- Earliest possible day on which Pentecost can fall, while June 13 is the latest; celebrated 50 days after Easter Day. (Christianity)
- Golden Spike Day (Promontory, Utah)
- Mother's Day (Guatemala, and Mexico)
