= Pope Stephen VIII =

Head of the Catholic Church from 939 to 942

- Bishop of Rome
- Church: Catholic Church
- Papacy began: 14 July 939
- Papacy ended: October 942
- Predecessor: Leo VII
- Successor: Marinus II
- Previous post: Cardinal-Priest of Santi Silvestre e Martino ai Monti (5 April 938-14 July 939)

Personal details
- Born: Rome, Papal States
- Died: October 942 Rome, Papal States

Pope Stephen VIII (Latin: Stephanus VIII; died October 942) was the bishop of Rome and nominal ruler of the Papal States from 14 July 939 to his death. His pontificate occurred during the Saeculum obscurum, when the power of popes was diminished by the ambitious counts of Tusculum, and was marked by the conflict between his patron, Alberic II of Spoleto, and King Hugh of Italy.

== Background ==
Stephen VIII was born of a Roman family, and prior to becoming pope was attached to the church of Saints Silvester and Martin.

== Pontificate ==
=== Frankish conflicts ===
After becoming pope, Stephen gave his attention to the situation in West Francia. In early 940, Stephen intervened on behalf of Louis IV of France, who had been trying to bring to heel his rebellious vassals, Hugh the Great and Herbert II of Vermandois, both of whom had appealed for support from King Otto I of Germany. Stephen dispatched a papal legate to the Frankish nobles, instructing them to acknowledge Louis, and to cease their rebellious actions against him, under threat of excommunication. Although the embassy did not achieve its stated objective, it did have the effect of removing the support of the Frankish bishops who had been backing Hugh and Herbert.

Emboldened, Stephen sought to break up the alliance against Louis by offering Herbert's son, Hugh of Vermandois, the office of archbishop of Reims. Along with the pallium, Stephen sent another legate, with instructions to the Frankish nobility, insisting that they submit to Louis. This time they were informed that if the pope had not received their embassies by Christmas, notifying him of their intent to submit to the king, they would be excommunicated. This time, there was a shift in support to Louis, as a number of the more important nobles declared for him, and by the end of 942, all of the nobility had affirmed their loyalty to Louis, and notified the pope of their intent.

=== Domestic difficulties ===
The continuing domination of the counts of Tusculum was evident throughout Stephen's pontificate, and the period is thus known as Saeculum obscurum. Although Stephen was subject to Alberic II of Spoleto and did not in reality rule the Papal States, Stephen himself was not a member of that family, nor had he any relationship with Alberic's mother, Marozia, who had dominated Roman and papal politics during the preceding decades. Stephen was, however, caught up in the ongoing conflict between Alberic and King Hugh of Italy, with Hugh besieging Rome in 940. After a failed attempt to assassinate him, which involved a number of bishops, Alberic cracked down on any potential dissent in Rome, with his enemies either scourged, beheaded or imprisoned. If there is any truth to Martin of Opava’s account of the torture and maiming of Stephen VIII by supporters of Alberic, it must have occurred at this juncture, in the aftermath of the conspiracy, and just prior to Stephen's death.

On 17 August 942, Alberic summoned a council in Rome, where he demonstrated his control over the papacy by making use of various papal officials, such as the primicerius, the secundicerius of the notaries, and the vestararius. Stephen died in October 942, and was succeeded by Marinus II.

== Historiography ==
According to the late 13th century chronicler Martin of Opava, Stephen VIII was described as being a German, who was elected pope due to the power and influence of relative Otto I. Martin states that Otto ignored the will of the cardinals in imposing Stephen upon them, and because Stephen was hated for being a German, he was taken by supporters of Alberic II, who proceeded to maim and disfigure him to such an extent that Stephen was unable to appear in public again. This version of events has largely been discredited; contemporary and near-contemporary catalogues state that Stephen was a Roman. Further, Otto's intervention in and influence over Italian affairs was still over a decade away, and during this period Otto was still trying to consolidate his hold on power in Germany, with major rebellions by the German dukes. Consequently, Otto would have been too preoccupied to concern himself over the papal succession at this juncture. Finally, Stephen's intervention on behalf of the Frankish king Louis IV (who was in conflict with Otto) would not have occurred had Stephen been a relative of the German king, and had Stephen received the papal throne through Otto's intervention. The maiming of Stephen may have occurred, however, in the aftermath of the conspiracy against Alberic in the middle of 942.

Catholic Church titles
Preceded by Leo VII	Pope; 939–942	Succeeded by Marinus II
