= Heriveus (archbishop of Reims) =

West Frankish churchman and political advisor

Heriveus of Reims (died 2 July 922) was a West Frankish churchman and political advisor. In 900, he was consecrated archbishop of Reims, holding this position until his death. Heriveus's tenure was marked by the genesis of the duchy of Normandy and the growing discord between the Carolingian king Charles the Simple and his Robertian rival Robert of Neustria.

== Biography ==
Heriveus was born to a noble Frankish family. The Reims historian Flodoard, who knew Heriveus well, states that he was the nephew of Hucbald, count of Ostrevent and Senlis, who was a son-in-law of Eberhard of Friuli. Heriveus is attested as a notary in the office of King Odo in 894, serving under the archchancellor Walter of Sens. After Charles the Simple succeeded Odo in 898, Heriveus continued to serve in the royal chancery, now led by Fulk of Reims.

Following Fulk's murder in 900, Heriveus succeeded him as archbishop of Reims, and was ordained by the suffragan bishops of the province on 6 July 900. As archbishop, Heriveus was a committed pastor and effective administrator. He oversaw several translations of saints' relics, including the movement of the body of St Remigius to a new position behind the altar in the abbey of Saint-Remi. He rebuilt several Reims fortifications which had been damaged or destroyed by the Vikings, including that at Mouzon on the river Meuse. In 902, he concluded an agreement with Archbishop Hatto of Mainz concerning the church of Reims's property rights in the Vosges and dedicated a new church in Kusel.

In 909, Heriveus convened a provincial synod at Trosly. The surviving acts state that the council had been called in order to address the recent devastation wrought upon the region by the Vikings and to condemn other moral failings. Heriveus and his provincial bishops implored clerics to avoid sinful behavior and laymen to respect ecclesiastical property and rights, and called for monasticism to be revived.

In 911, following the Siege of Chartres, where Robert of Neustria and Richard, Duke of Burgundy defeated the Northmen, King Charles the Simple agreed the Treaty of Saint-Clair-sur-Epte with the Norman leader Rollo, ceding him the city of Rouen and territories along the Seine which would become the duchy of Normandy. Heriveus participated in this process, and continued to correspond with Archbishop Witto of Rouen on the matter of the Normans' conversion to Christianity.

For most of his episcopacy, Heriveus remained a loyal supporter of Charles the Simple. In 920, many of his Charles's nobles were alienated by the king's favoritism of the upstart Count Hagano. Heriveus played a key role in effecting a reconciliation. In 922, however, the nobles again rebelled, and this time Heriveus too broke from the king, rallying behind Robert, duke of the Franks and brother of the late king Odo, Heriveus and other nobles dramatically defected. Robert was crowned king at the abbey of Saint-Remi in Reims by Archbishop Walter of Sens on 29 June 922. Heriveus was evidently in ill health at this time, for he died just days later on 2 July. He was succeeded in the archbishopric by Seulf.

Catholic Church titles
Preceded by Fulk	Archbishop of Reims; 900–922	Succeeded by Seulf
