= 946 =

Calendar year

946 in various calendars
- Gregorian calendar: 946; CMXLVI
- Ab urbe condita: 1699
- Armenian calendar: 395; ԹՎ ՅՂԵ
- Assyrian calendar: 5696
- Balinese saka calendar: 867–868
- Bengali calendar: 352–353
- Berber calendar: 1896
- Buddhist calendar: 1490
- Burmese calendar: 308
- Byzantine calendar: 6454–6455
- Chinese calendar: 乙巳年 (Wood Snake); 3643 or 3436 — to — 丙午年 (Fire Horse); 3644 or 3437
- Coptic calendar: 662–663
- Discordian calendar: 2112
- Ethiopian calendar: 938–939
- Hebrew calendar: 4706–4707
- Hindu calendars
- Vikram Samvat: 1002–1003
- Shaka Samvat: 867–868
- Kali Yuga: 4046–4047
- Holocene calendar: 10946
- Iranian calendar: 324–325
- Islamic calendar: 334–335
- Japanese calendar: Tengyō 9 (天慶９年)
- Javanese calendar: 846–847
- Julian calendar: 946; CMXLVI
- Korean calendar: 3279
- Minguo calendar: 966 before ROC 民前966年
- Nanakshahi calendar: −522
- Seleucid era: 1257/1258 AG
- Thai solar calendar: 1488–1489
- Tibetan calendar: ཤིང་མོ་སྦྲུལ་ལོ་ (female Wood-Snake); 1072 or 691 or −81 — to — མེ་ཕོ་རྟ་ལོ་ (male Fire-Horse); 1073 or 692 or −80

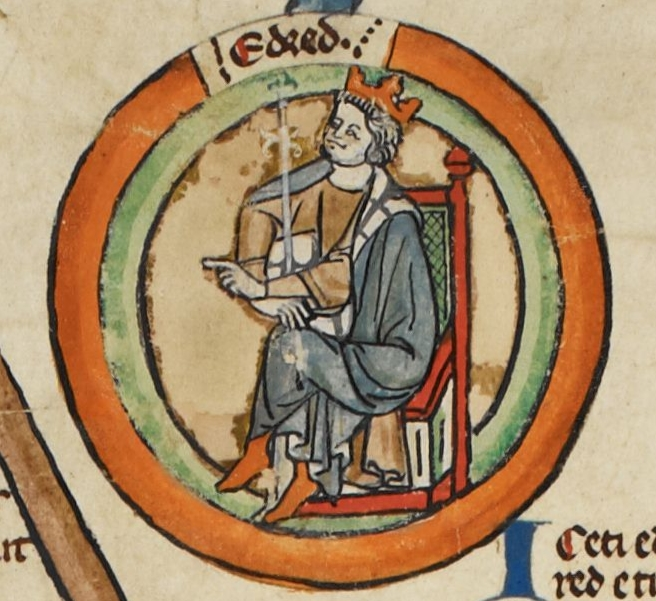
King Eadred of England (923–955)

Year 946 (CMXLVI) was a common year starting on Thursday of the Julian calendar.

== Events ==
=== By place ===
==== Europe ====
- Summer – King Otto I invades the West Frankish Kingdom with an expeditionary force, but his armies are not strong enough to take the key cities of Laon, Reims and Paris. After three months, Otto ends his campaign without defeating his rival Hugh the Great. He manages to depose Hugh of Vermandois from his position as archbishop of Reims, restoring Artald of Reims to his former office.

==== England ====
- May 26 – King Edmund I is murdered at age 25 by an outlawed robber while attending St. Augustine's Day mass in Pucklechurch (Gloucestershire). He is succeeded by his brother Eadred (or Edred) as king of England.

==== Arabian Empire ====
- January 28 – Caliph Al-Mustakfi is blinded and deposed by Emir Mu'izz al-Dawla, ruler of the Buyid Empire. He is succeeded by Al-Muti and becomes only a figurehead (with the Buyid Dynasty as dominate rule) of the once-powerful Abbasid Caliphate while he tries to restore peace.
- Battle of Baghdad: Along the banks of the Tigris, Buyid forces under Mu'izz al-Dawla defeat the Hamdanids for control of the city. They are forced to pay tax revenues and agree to recognize Al-Muti as the legitimate caliph.

==== Japan ====
- May 16 – Emperor Suzaku abdicates the throne after a 16-year reign. He is succeeded by his brother Murakami, who becomes the 62nd emperor of Japan.

=== By topic ===
==== Religion ====
- Summer – Pope Marinus II dies at Rome after a four-year reign. He is succeeded by Agapetus II and elected with the support of the Roman despot Alberic II. Agapetus is installed as the 129th pope of the Catholic Church.

==== Volcanology ====
- c. November 2 – Super-colossal (VEI-7) 946 AD Eruption of Paektu Mountain on the modern North Korea-China border the eruption was one of the most violent in the past 10,000 years along with KO eruption in 8th Millennium BC, The Crater lake's eruption in 7th Millennium BC, The Kikai caldera's Akahoya eruption in 5th Millennium BC, The Thera or Santorini's eruption in 2nd Millennium BC, The Lake Taupo's Hatepe eruption, The Lake Ilopango's eruption in around 535 and 536, The 1257 eruption of Mount Samalas, The mystery eruption in 1453, and the 1815 Tambora eruption.

== Births ==
- Henry I, duke of Burgundy (d. 1002)
- Henry II ("the Good"), count of Stade (d. 1016)
- Approximate date
  - Sylvester II, pope of the Catholic Church (d. 1003)
  - Theodora, Byzantine empress consort

== Deaths ==
- January 26 – Eadgyth, queen consort of Germany (b. 910)
- May 17 – Al-Qa'im bi-Amr Allah, Fatimid caliph (b. 893)
- May 26 – Edmund I, king of England (b. 921)
- June 4 – Guaimar II (Gybbosus), Lombard prince
- July 24 – Muhammad ibn Tughj al-Ikhshid, ruler of Egypt (b. 882)
- August 1
  - Ali ibn Isa al-Jarrah, Abbasid vizier (b. 859)
  - Lady Xu Xinyue, wife of Qian Yuanguan (b. 902)
- November 26 – Li Congyan, Chinese general (b. 898)
- Abu Bakr bin Yahya al-Suli, Abbasid scholar and chess player (b. 880)
- Abu Bakr Shibli, Persian official and Sufi (b. 861)
- Cormacan Eigeas, Irish poet (approximate date)
- Daniel Ben Moses al-Kumisi, Jewish scholar
- Ibrahim ibn Sinan, Abbasid mathematician (b. 908)
- John of Rila, Bulgarian hermit (approximate date)
- Marinus II, pope of the Catholic Church
- Rachilidis, Swiss Benedictine hermit and saint
- Yeghishe I, Catholicos of All Armenians
- Zhao Jiliang, chancellor of Later Shu (b. 883)
