= Count of Champagne =

Ruler of a feudal principality in medieval France

Original coat of arms of the county of Champagne.

The count of Champagne was the ruler of the County of Champagne from 950 to 1316. Champagne evolved from the County of Troyes in the late eleventh century and Hugh I was the first to officially use the title count of Champagne.

Count Theobald IV of Champagne inherited the Kingdom of Navarre in 1234. His great-granddaughter Joan married King Philip IV of France. Upon Joan's death in 1305, their son Louis became the last independent count of Champagne, with the title merging into the royal domain upon his accession to the French throne in 1314.

The titular counts of Champagne also inherited the post of seneschal of France.

== Counts and dukes of Champagne, Troyes, Meaux and Blois ==
=== Dukes of Champagne ===

In Merovingian and Carolingian times, several dukes of Champagne (or Campania) are known. The duchy appears to have been created by combining the civitates of Rheims, Châlons-sur-Marne, Laon, and Troyes. In the late seventh and early eighth centuries, Champagne was controlled by the Pippinids; first by Drogo, son of Pippin of Herstal, and then by Drogo's son Arnulf.

- Drogo (690–707), abdicated
- Arnulf (707-723), deposed

=== Counts of Meaux and Troyes ===
Counts of Troyes

- Odo I (853–858 and 866–871), 3rd son of Robert III of Worms and younger brother of Robert the Strong
- Rudolph I (858–866)
- Odo II (871–876)
- Robert I (876–886)
- Adalelm (886–894)
- Richard (894–921), also Duke of Burgundy
- Rudolph II (921–936), also Duke of Burgundy and King of France
- Hugh (936–952), also Duke of Burgundy
- Gilbert (952–956), also Duke of Burgundy

Counts of Meaux

- Louis (862–877), also King of Aquitaine and France
- Theodebert (877–888)
- Herbert I (896–902)
- Herbert II (902–943)
- Robert (943–967), in Troyes from 956

Counts of Troyes and Meaux

- Robert of Troyes (956–967)
- Herbert III of Meaux, (967–995)
- Stephen I (995–1022)
- Odo I of Meaux and III of Troyes (1022–1037), also Count of Blois
- Stephen II (1037–1048)
- Odo II of Meaux and IV of Troyes (1048–1066)
- Theobald I (1066–1089), also Count of Blois

Counts of Troyes

- Odo V (1089–1093)
- Hugh (1093–1102)

Counts of Meaux and Blois

- Stephen III Henry (1089–1102)
- Theobald II (1102–1151), in Champagne from 1125

=== Counts of Champagne ===

- Hugh (1102–1125)
- Theobald II (1125–1152)
- Henry I (1152–1181)
- Henry II (1181–1197), also King of Jerusalem as Henry I
- Theobald III (1197–1201)

- Theobald IV, also King of Navarre as Theobald I (1201–1253)
- Theobald V, also King of Navarre as Theobald II (1253–1270)
- Henry III, also King of Navarre as Henry I (1270–1274)
- Joan (1274–1305), Countess suo jure, also Queen of Navarre. 1274-1285 during Joan's minority regency exercised by her mother Blanche of Artois and Edmund Crouchback from 1275. Edmund is described in contemporary sources as “campanie et Brie comes palatinus” that is “Palatine Count of Champagne and Brie”.

- Philip (co-ruler of Joan), also King of France as Philip IV
- Louis (1305–1316), also King of Navarre, became King of France in 1314, after which the title merged into the royal domain

== See also ==
- Timeline of Troyes

== Sources ==
- Evergates, Theodore. Feudal Society in the Baillage of Troyes under the Counts of Champagne, 1152-1284. ISBN 0-8018-1663-7
- Evergates, Theodore. Feudal Society in Medieval France: Documents from the County of Champagne. ISBN 0-8122-1441-2 (paperback), ISBN 0-8122-3225-9 (hardback)
- Evergates, Theodore. "The Aristocracy of Champagne in the Mid-Thirteenth Century: A Quantitative Description." Journal of Interdisciplinary History, Vol. 5. pp 1–18 (1974).
- Marshall, John (2026). Edmund, 1st Earl of Lancaster. Barsnley: Pen and Sword Books. ISBN 978-1-03614-368-8.
