= Pope Agapetus II =

Head of the Catholic Church from 946 to 955

- Bishop of Rome
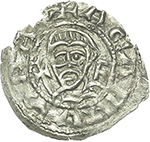
- Denarius of Agapetus II
- Church: Catholic Church
- Papacy began: 10 May 946
- Papacy ended: 8 November 955
- Predecessor: Marinus II
- Successor: John XII

Personal details
- Born: about 911 Rome, Papal States
- Died: 8 November 955 Rome, Papal States

Pope Agapetus II (c. 911 – 8 November 955) was the bishop of Rome and ruler of the Papal States from 10 May 946 to his death. A nominee of the princeps of Rome, Alberic II of Spoleto, his pontificate occurred during the period known as the Saeculum obscurum.

== Pontificate ==
He was elected pope on 10 May 946 after the death of Marinus II. The existence of an independent republic of Rome, ruled by Alberic II of Spoleto, meant that Agapetus was prevented from exercising any temporal or secular power in Rome and the Papal States. The struggle between Berengar II and Otto I for the Kingdom of Italy allowed Alberic to exercise complete control over Rome and Agapetus, meaning the pope was largely limited to managing internal church affairs. Even Agapetus’ invitation to Otto to intervene in Italian affairs in 951 was done at the instigation of Alberic, who was growing concerned at Berengar's growing power. However, when Otto's envoys, the bishops of Mainz and Chur, were sent to the pope to discuss Otto's reception in Rome and other more important questions, they were turned away by Alberic.

Agapetus was forced to intervene in the dispute over the occupancy of the See of Reims. He ordered a synod to be held at Ingelheim in June 948 to resolve the rights of the rival claimants, Hugh of Vermandois and Artald of Reims. He sent his legate Marinus of Bomarzo to act on his behalf, while Agapetus wrote to a number of bishops, asking them to be present at the council. Through his legate the pope indicated his support for King Louis IV of France, and gave his support for reinstalling Artald as bishop of Reims. This council was followed up by another one at Trier, where Agapetus was again represented by Marinus of Bomarzo. In 949, Agapetus held a synod in Rome, which confirmed the rulings of the two councils. It condemned the former bishop Hugh and it excommunicated his father, Count Herbert II of Vermandois, for his opposition to King Louis IV.

After receiving requests from both Louis IV of France and Otto I of Germany, Agapetus granted privileges to monasteries and nunneries within their respective kingdoms. He also was sympathetic towards Otto's plans to restructure the bishoprics within Germany, which were eventually aborted due to pressure exerted by William of Mainz. Around 948, Agapetus granted the Archbishop of Hamburg the right of consecrating bishops in Denmark and other northern European countries instead of the pope. The pope was also allegedly asked by a Danish king named Frode, now considered mythical, to send missionaries to his kingdom.

Agapetus was also asked to intervene in a dispute between Herhold, archbishop of Salzburg and Gerard, bishop of Lauriacum, who both claimed the title of metropolitan of all Pannonia. Agapetus dispatched a letter to the two claimants, in which he stated that the diocese of Lauriacum had been the metropolitan church of all Pannonia before the invasion of the Huns. However, following the ravages inflicted by them, the metropolitan had transferred his see to another city, and since that time Salzburg had been raised to an archbishopric. Consequently, both lawfully occupied their respective sees, and both were to retain their rank and diocese. Agapetus ruled that jurisdiction over western Pannonia would rest with Herhold, while the eastern part, along with the regions occupied by the Avars and the Moravians, would fall under Gerard.

In Italy, Agapetus wrote to the dukes of Beneventum and Capua, demanding that monasteries be returned to the monks whom they had displaced. He also deposed the bishops of Termoli and Trivento who were accused of simony. Hoping to rejuvenate the religious life of the clerics in Italy, Agapetus, with the blessing of Alberic, asked for the abbot of Gorze Abbey to send some of his monks down and join the monastic community attached to the church of Saint Paul Outside the Walls.

Agapetus died on 8 November 955, and was succeeded by Alberic's son, Octavian, who took the papal name of John XII. He was buried in the Lateran basilica, behind the apse, and close to the tombs of Leo V and Paschal II. Agapetus was noted for his caution and for the sanctity with which he led his life.

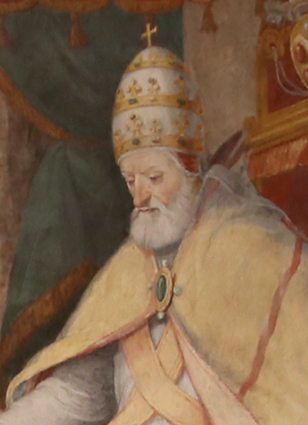
16th century depiction of Agapetus II

== Notes ==
Catholic Church titles
Preceded by Marinus II	Pope; 946–955	Succeeded by John XII
