= Herbert III =

Herbert III may refer to:

- Herbert III of Omois (910–980/985)
- Herbert III, Count of Meaux (circa 950 – 995)
- Herbert III, Count of Vermandois (953–1015)
