= Herbert of Vermandois =

Herbert of Vermandois may refer to:

== Counts of Vermandois ==
- Herbert I of Vermandois (c. 848/850–907), Count of Vermandois, lord of Senlis, of Peronne and of Saint Quentin, son of Pepin of Vermandois
- Herbert II of Vermandois (884–943), son of the above
- Herbert III of Vermandois (953–1015)
- Herbert IV, Count of Vermandois (1028–1080)

== Other ==
- Herbert III, Count of Meaux (circa 950 – 995), member of the House of Vermandois
