= Bivin of Gorze =

Founder of the Bizinid dynasty

Bivin of Gorze (810/830 – 863) was a Frankish nobleman, regarded as the founder of the Bivinid family. He was married to a daughter of Boso the Elder, who may have been called Richildis. During his life he functioned as lay abbot of the Gorze Abbey. His offspring includes:

- Richilde of Provence, who married King Charles the Bald
- Richard the Justiciar, Duke of Burgundy, father of a king of France
- Boso, King of Provence
- possibly Bivin, Count of Metz.

Richildis was married to Eccard of Macon towards the end of Bivin's life, resulting in Eccard's inheritance passing to Richard the Justicar, with Boso acting a guardian during his minority. This relationship led to the dismantling of Burgundy.

== Sources ==
- Bouchard, Constance B. (1988). "The Bosonids or Rising to Power in the Late Carolingian Age". French Historical Studies. 15, No. 3 (Spring). Duke University Press: 407–431. doi:10.2307/286367. JSTOR 286367.
- Riché, Pierre (1983). The Carolingians: The Family who Forged Europe. Translated by Allen, Michael Idomir. University of Pennsylvania Press.
