= Hugh of Vermandois =

Hugh of Vermandois may refer to:

- Hugh of Vermandois (bishop) (920–962), Archbishop of Reims from 925 to 931
- Hugh, Count of Vermandois (1053–1101), younger son of Henry I of France
