= Synod of Ingelheim =

The Universal Synod of Ingelheim began on June 7, 948 in the then church of Saint Remigius in Ingelheim. Being summoned by Pope Agapetus II its primary goal was to resolve a long running Schism concerning the archiepiscopal see of Reims. The synod was presided by Marinus of Bomarzo, then the Roman Church's librarian. In the run up to the convocation there were two earlier synods, in Verdun in November 947 and in Mouzon in the beginning of 948, both considering the same problem but unable to resolve it.

== Topics ==
Since 931 the archiepiscopal see was claimed by Hugh of Vermandois and Artald of Reims. Hugh was supported by his uncle, Hugh the Great while Artald was supported by both Louis IV. and Otto the Great. The aforementioned appeared at the synod in person while Hugh the Great was absent and not even substituted for. A clerk of Hugh of Vermandois named Sigbaldus then presented a letter stating that Guy, Bishop of Soissons, Hildegarius of Beauvais, Raoul [II] of Laon and the remaining bishops of the province of Reims had sent letters requesting Hugh be restored to the bishopric of Reims and Artald be expelled. Several of the bishops named stood up and protested they had not seen, nor heard, nor authorized such a letter. Sigbaldus was exiled and it was ruled that the see was to be given to Artald.

The following day Archbishop Robert of Trier stated that because the diocese of Reims had been restored to Artald, the synod should judge the one who invaded that see. The canons of holy law having been read, they decreed that Hugh of Vermandois was excommunicated and removed from the church "until he should do penance and make worthy satisfaction."

Other important matters included consanguineous marriages. In order to inadvertently avoid marrying someone within the prohibited degree of kinship all Christians were strongly recommended to keep a list of their ancestors and that nobles compare such lists before contracting a marriage.

Other subjects included the founding of missionary dioceses in Scandinavia, this fact being the reason for the attendance of the bishops Liopdgad of Ripen, Oredo of Schleswig and Reginbrand of Aarhus. Another issue was to restrict the Ottonic proprieritary church system.

== Importance ==
Being attained by the two kings of East and West Francia, 32 archbishops and bishops as well as other clerical dignitaries this synod was one of the most important assemblies being held in Ingelheim and one of the climaxes in Ingelheim's importance as one of the political centres of the empire.

== Participants ==
Apart from Louis, Otto and Marinus Regesta Imperii mentions the following participants:

1. Frederick of Mainz
2. Ruotbert of Trier,
3. Wicfrid von Köln,
4. Artald, Archbishop of Reims,
5. Adaldag of Hamburg,
6. Herold of Salzburg,
7. Richgowo of Worms,
8. Ulrich of Augsburg,
9. Bernhard of Halberstadt,
10. Diethard of Hildesheim,
11. Conrad of Constance,
12. Starcand of Eichstätt,
13. Dudo of Paderborn,
14. Reginbald of Speyer,
15. Bobbo of Würzburg,
16. Adalbero I of Metz,
17. Gauzelin of Toul,
18. Berengar of Verdun,
19. Balderic of Utrecht,
20. Dodo of Osnabrück,
21. Eberis of Minden,
22. Hildbold of Münster,
23. Varaberd of Tungern,
24. Fulbert of Cambrai,
25. Raoul of Laon,
26. Michael of Regensburg,
27. Adalbert of Passau,
28. Leofdag of Ribe,
29. Oredo of Schleswig,
30. Reginbrand of Aarhuus,
31. Wichard of Basel (questionable)

== Additional references ==
- Pertz, G.H. (Hrsg.): Monumenta Historica Germaniæ (= MGH LL 2), p. 19ff., Hannover, 1837.
- Flodoard von Reims, Stratmann, Martina (Hrsg): Historia Remensis Ecclesiæ, (= MGH SS XXXVI), Liber IV cap. XXXV (=S. 428ff.), Hannover 1998
- Hehl, Dieter (Hrsg.): Die Konzilien Deutschlands und Reichsitaliens 916-1001 (= MGH Conc 6/1), p. 135ff., Hannover 1987
- Böhmer, J. F: Regesta Imperii II. Sächsisches Haus 919-1024. 5: Papstregesten 911-1024 Böhmer, Johann Friedrich; Zimmermann, Harald (Bearb.).
