= Fulk (archbishop of Reims) =

Roman Catholic archbishop

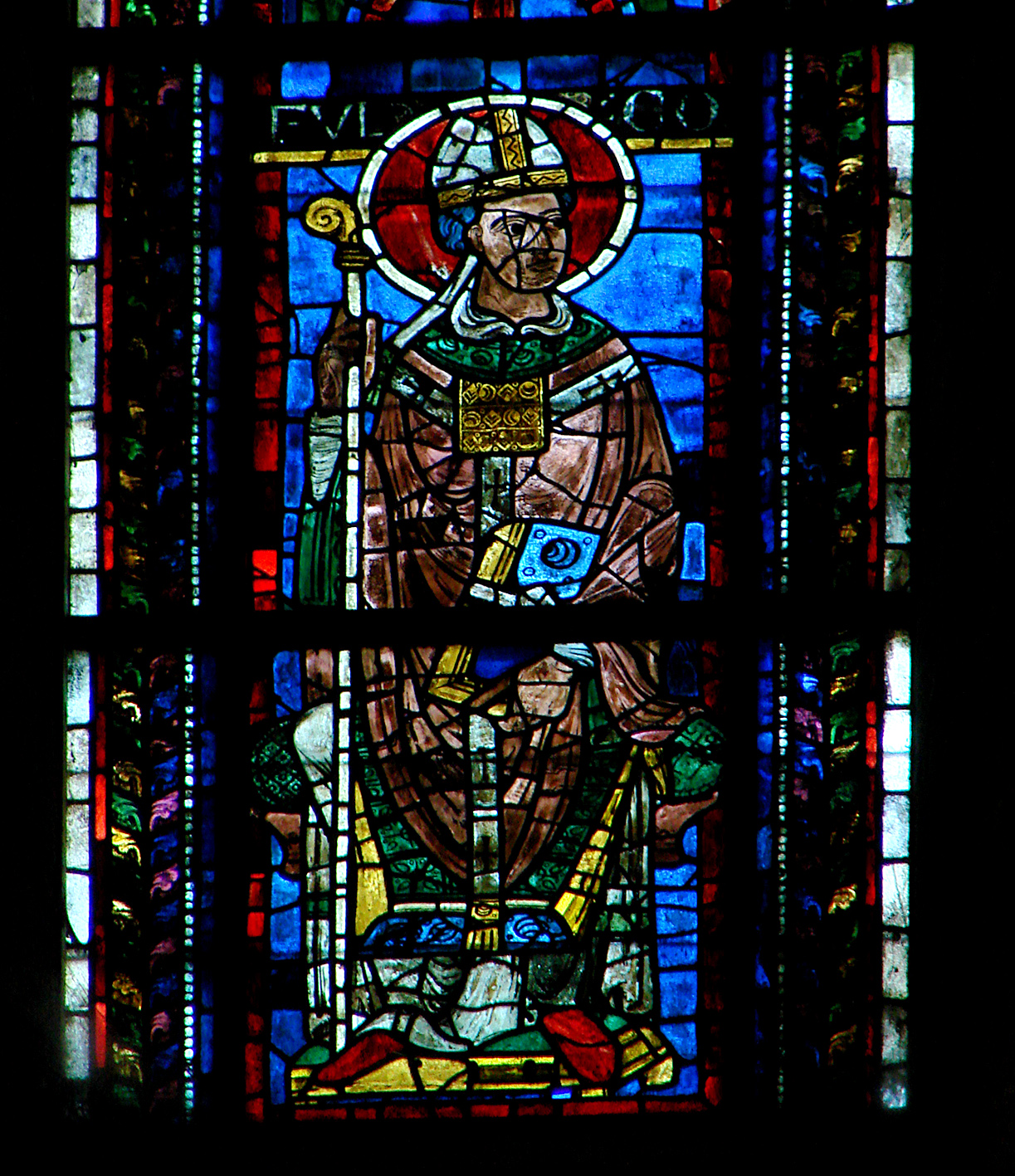
Fulk the Venerable, archbishop of Reims (883-900), as depicted in a twelfth-century stained glass portrait in the Abbey of Saint-Remi.

Fulk the Venerable (died June 17, 900) was archbishop of Reims from 883 until his death. He was a key figure in the political conflicts of the West Frankish kingdom that followed the dissolution of the Carolingian Empire in the late ninth century.

== Biography ==
Fulk was born into a powerful aristocratic family, and his brother was Anscar I, Margrave of Ivrea. He became a palace cleric of Charles the Bald, and by 877 had been made abbot of the abbey of Saint Bertin near Saint-Omer, France. He was consecrated archbishop of Reims in March 883, succeeding the long-serving Hincmar. As bishop, he corresponded with rulers, bishops and popes about a range of political and religious matters. Much of what is known about Fulk's career comes from the historian Flodoard's History of the Church of Reims, written in 948-52, which narrates his life and preserves summaries of some 76 letters, half of which were written to or sent by popes. Fulk corresponded with Alfred the Great regarding the needs of the English church, and rebuked Queen Richilde for what he considered irregular behavior.

Upon the deposition of the Carolingian emperor Charles the Fat in 887, Fulk attempted to install his kinsman Guy III, Duke of Spoleto, as king of West Francia, and even crowned him at Langres in 888. However, Odo, the Robertian count of Paris, was crowned by Walter, archbishop of Sens, and accepted by the nobles as king. Fulk, having had his favoured candidate passed over, continued to oppose Odo's rule, and as a possible alternative turned first to Arnulf of Carinthia, who had succeeded Charles in East Francia, also to no avail. Fulk eventually settled for backing the young Carolingian Charles the Simple, the son of Louis the Stammerer who had been passed over in 888 on account of his youth. In 893, Fulk crowned Charles king in opposition to Odo, and following continued conflict among the kingdom's magnates, agreement was reached whereby Charles would succeed Odo, which happened in 898. The rivalries and factions that emerged in this period set the stage for frequent conflicts between the Carolingians, Robertians and other noble families in the coming decades. Upon Charles' accession, he made Fulk his chancellor.

Following a period of intensified Viking raiding in the late ninth century, in 893 Fulk restored the schools of Reims, bringing in the renowned teachers Remigius of Auxerre and Hucbald of Saint-Amand.

Political tensions continued to simmer, however, and in 900, Fulk was assassinated on the orders of Count Baldwin of Flanders. Charles granted to Fulk the abbey of St Vaast, which had previously been held by Baldwin, whom the king suspected of disloyalty. While traveling with a small escort to meet with Charles, Fulk was killed by a man called Winemar and several accomplices, all of whom were in the service of Baldwin. The murder of a bishop was extremely rare in the Carolingian period, and the event shocked contemporaries, as indicated by the independent accounts of the chroniclers Regino of Prüm, the anonymous author of the Annals of Saint-Vaast, and Flodoard of Reims. Fulk was succeeded in the archbishopric by Heriveus, who convened a synod where Winemar was excommunicated for his crime.

Catholic Church titles
Preceded by Hincmar	Archbishop of Reims; 882–900	Succeeded by Heriveus
