= Adelaide of Auxerre (born c. 870) =

Duchess consort of Burgundy (870–929)

Adelaide
- Duchess consort of Burgundy
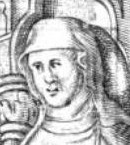
- Adelaide of Auxerre
- Born: c. 865-870
- Noble family: Elder House of Welf
- Spouse: Richard, Duke of Burgundy
- Issue: Hugh the Black; Rudolph of France; Adelaide of Burgundy
- Father: Conrad II, Duke of Transjurane Burgundy
- Mother: Waldrada

Adelaide of Auxerre (born between 865 and 870, died between 928 and 929) was a Duchess consort of Burgundy by marriage to Richard, Duke of Burgundy, and had the title Countess of Auxerre, possibly as ruling Countess.

She was the daughter of Conrad II, Duke of Transjurane Burgundy.

In 888, she married Richard, Duke of Burgundy. Adelaide is called Countess of Auxerre between 888 and 921. Exactly why is not clarified. It has been suggested that this was because she was given the County of Auxerre as her dowry. It is possible that she was ruler of Auxerre.

== Issue ==
- Rudolph of France, who married Emma of France, daughter of Robert I of France
- Hugh the Black
- Boson (895-935)
- Adelaide of Burgundy, married Reginar II, Count of Hainaut.
- Ermengarde of Burgundy (born c. 905 and died c. 945)
