= Odalric (bishop) =

French archbishop

Odalric was made Archbishop of Reims in 962. He was from a Lotharingian family and claimed to descend from Bishop Arnulf of Metz.

== Sources ==
- Annals of Flodoard of Reims

Catholic Church titles
Preceded by Artald	Archbishop of Reims; 962–969	Succeeded by Adalberon
