= Richard the Justiciar =

Duke of Burgundy and Count of Autun

Richard
- Duke of Burgundy
- Born: 858
- Died: 921 (Aged About 63)
- Buried: Abbey of Sainte-Colombe, Saint-Denis-lès-Sens
- Noble family: Bosonids
- Spouse: Adelaide of Auxerre
- Issue more...: Rudolph of France; Hugh the Black
- Father: Bivin of Gorze
- Mother: Richildis (?)

Richard the Justiciar (858–921), also known as Richard of Autun, was count of Autun from 880 and the first margrave and duke of Burgundy. He attained suzerainty over all the counties of Burgundy save Mâcon, and by 890, he was referred to as dux (duke) and by 900 as marchio (margrave). By 918, he was being called dux Burgundionem or dux Burgundiae, which probably signified less the existence of a unified Burgundian duchy than feudal suzerainty over a multiplicity of counties in a specific region.

== Life ==
Richard was a Bosonid, the son of Bivin of Gorze and Richildis. His elder brother was Boso of Provence and his younger sister was Richildis, second wife of Charles the Bald.

In 875, after the death of the Emperor Louis II, Richard and Boso accompanied Charles to Italy for his imperial coronation. In February 876, in Pavia, while preparing for his return journey, Charles nominated Boso "Duke and Viceroy of Italy and Duke of Provence". In 877, on Charles's death, Boso returned to France and confided the realm of Italy and the Duchy of Provence to Richard and Hugh the Abbot as missi dominici.

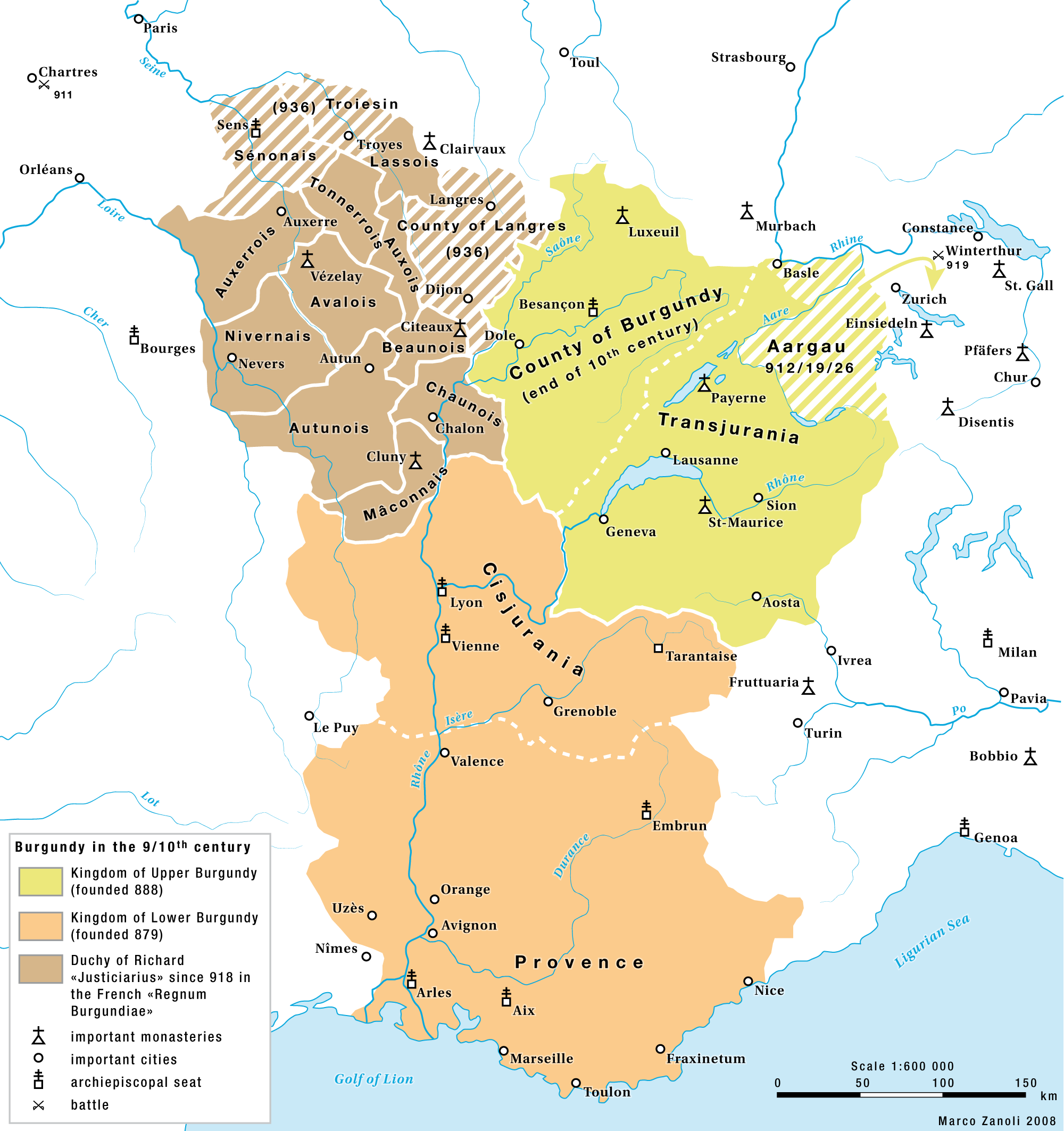
Map of the three parts in the old Kingdom of Burgundy, ca 900. Upper Burgundy Lower Burgundy Duchy of Burgundy of Richard the Justiciar

In 879, Boso declared himself "King of Provence" following the death of Louis the Stammerer, but Richard defected from Boso and took Boso's county of Autun, which Carloman II confirmed to him in 880. The two joined battle on the Saône and Richard captured Mâcon and garrisoned it in the name of Carloman and Louis III under the command of Bernard Plantapilosa, a relative of the hereditary counts of Mâcon. After taking Lyon, he besieged his brother's capital of Vienne, where he was joined by Louis, Carloman, and the emperor Charles the Fat. Richard eventually drove Boso out in 882 and captured his wife Ermengard and children Engelberga and Louis, sending them as prisoners to Autun. Boso went into hiding in Provence.

After the death of Charles the Fat in 888, Richard supported the claim of Duke Rudolph to be King of Upper Burgundy and married his sister Adelaide, daughter of Conrad II of Auxerre. Richard also supported the coronation of his nephew Louis as King of Provence in 890.

Richard died and was buried at Sens. He was exhorted by a bishop at his deathbed to beg a pardon for shedding so much blood in his life. He responded:

When I have killed a brigand, I have saved the life of honest men, the death of one helping prevent his accomplices from making more evil.

== Family ==
By his wife Adelaide (married 888), daughter of Conrad II, Count of Auxerre, and Waldrada of Worms, he had several sons and daughters:

- Rudolph, successor and later King of Francia
- Hugh the Black, later Duke of Burgundy
- Boso, married Bertha, daughter of Boso, Margrave of Tuscany
- Ermengard, married Gilbert, Duke of Burgundy
- Adelaide, married Reginar II, Count of Hainaut
- Richilda, married Litaud I, Count of Mâcon

== See also ==
- Dukes of Burgundy family tree

== Sources ==
- Bouchard, Constance B. "The Bosonids or Rising to Power in the Late Carolingian Age." French Historical Studies, Vol. 15, No. 3. (Spring, 1988), pp 407–431.

Preceded by none	Duke of Burgundy	Succeeded by Rudolph
