= Herbert III of Meaux =

Herbert the Younger (circa 950–995) was the Count of Troyes and Meaux. He was the son of Robert of Vermandois and Adelaide Werra, daughter of Gilbert of Burgundy. He belonged to the Herbertien dynasty, an illegitimate branch of the Carolingian dynasty. He is called Herbert III the Younger to be distinguished from his uncle Herbert III the Elder.

He inherited his father's domains in 966 and part of those of his uncle, Herbert III of Omois, in 984, shared with his cousin Odo of Blois. From his uncle he received Épernay and Vitry with the Perthois. He was a partisan and supporter of King Lothair and followed on his conquest of Upper Lorraine, after which he was guarded the captive Godfrey I of Verdun. After the death of Lothair's heir, Louis V, in 987, Herbert sided with Odo I of Blois and backed Charles, Duke of Lower Lorraine, probably his brother-in-law.

Herbert's wife's name is unknown.

- His son and heir was Stephen.

Preceded by Robert	Count of Troyes; 966–995	Succeeded by Stephen I
Preceded by Robert	Count of Meaux; 966–995	Succeeded by Stephen I
