= Walter (archbishop of Sens) =

Walter (or Vaulter) was Archbishop of Sens from 887 to 923.

He anointed Eudes as King of France in 888, Robert I in July 922, and Rudolph of France on 13 July 923, all in the church of St. Medard's Abbey, Soissons.

He doubtlessly inherited from his uncle Walter, Bishop of Orléans, a superb sacramentary composed between 855 and 873 for the Abbey of St-Amand at Puelle. This sacramentary, which he gave to the church of Sens, forms one of the most curious monuments of Carolingian art and is now in the library of Stockholm.

== Sources ==
- McKitterick, R. The Frankish kingdoms under the Carolingians, 751-987. London, 1983.
