= Hugh of Vermandois (bishop) =

Archbishop of Reims from 925 to 931

Hugh of Vermandois (920–962) was the archbishop of Reims from 925 to 931 and from 940 to 946. He was the son of Herbert II, Count of Vermandois, and Adela, the daughter of Robert I of France and sister of Hugh the Great.

== Life ==
Upon the death of Seulf, the previous archbishop of Reims, Hugh's father Herbert was able to leverage his influence on king Rudolph of France to impose his son, not yet five years old, as bishop-elect. According to Flodoard, who was an opponent of Hugh and his father, count Herbert had Seulf poisoned, then compelled the city's clergy and laymen to elect his son bishop, which was then ratified by king Rudolph. This enabled him to take control of the diocese's administration. Odolricus, who was either bishop of Aix or of Dax, was brought in to assume the office of a bishop in Hugh's place.

In 931, hostilities broke out between count Herbert and the king, aided by Hugh the Great. Herbert, who had been the power behind the episcopate, was driven out of Reims and a new archbishop, Artald, supported by Hugh the Great, was imposed.

By the end of 938, relations between Hugh the Great and the new king of the Franks, Louis IV, had significantly deteriorated, and Hugh the Great and count Herbert openly rebelled. In 940, they laid siege to Reims, with the support of William Longsword, ruler of Normandy. According to Flodoard, the defenders deserted Artald, and the city fell after only six days, after which Hugh of Vermandois was again installed as bishop. His position was weakened after the death of his father in February 943. Though king Louis confirmed his status as archbishop that same year, he soon turned against Hugh the Great and his nephews, the sons of Herbert of Vermandois, and unsuccessfully attempted to oust archbishop Hugh from Reims in 945. At the end of the summer of 946, a coalition led by king Louis, his brother-in-law Otto the Great and Conrad I of Burgundy, intent on breaking Hugh the Great and his allies' power, laid siege to Reims again, and the city surrendered after a brief three days of siege, upon which the 26-year-old archbishop Hugh fled the city and was replaced as archbishop by Artald again. At the synod of Ingelheim in 948, attended by both Louis and Otto as well as 32 bishops and archbishops, Artald was definitely confirmed as archbishop of Reims while Hugh was excommunicated.

After Artald's death in 961, Hugh's brothers Herbert III of Vermandois and Robert of Troyes, as well as Hugh Capet, Hugh the Great's son, petitioned the new king, Lothair, to restore Hugh of Vermandois to the archbishopric. Lothair's uncle and previous regent Bruno, brother of Otto the Great, duke of Lotharingia and archbishop of Cologne, opposed this. A synod was held in Meaux to decide on the matter, with thirteen bishops from the provinces of Reims and Sens in attendance. The majority of the synod was originally in favour of Hugh of Vermandois's restoration. However, bishops Roricon of Laon and Gibuin of Châlons argued that due to the low number of attendees, the synod of Meaux could not overrule the previous synod of Ingelheim. The matter was then brought before Pope John XII, who was close to Otto the Great. In the spring of 962, the pope confirmed Hugh's deposition and excommunication. Instead, a Lotharingian canon and friend of Bruno, Odalric, was elected, allowing Otto the Great to expand his imperial church system into West Francia. Hugh of Vermandois died at Meaux a few days later, from "mental anguish", according to the historian Richer of Reims.

== Notes ==
Catholic Church titles
Preceded by Seulf	Archbishop of Reims; 925–931	Succeeded by Artald
Preceded by Artald	Archbishop of Reims; 940–946	Succeeded by Artald
