= Hugh the Black =

10th-century duke of Burgundy

- Duke of Burgundy
- Reign: 923–952
- Died: 952
- Noble family: Bivinids
- Father: Richard the Justiciar
- Mother: Adelaide of Auxerre

Hugh the Black (died 952) was Duke of Burgundy from 923 until his death in 952. He was a Bosonid through his father, who was the younger brother of Boso of Provence.

Hugh was the son of Richard of Autun, duke of Burgundy, and Adelaide of Auxerre. He succeeded his older brother Rudolph as duke of Burgundy, when Rudolph was elected king of West Francia, in 923.

Following Rudolph's death in 936, Hugh may have had aspirations to follow his brother onto the throne and refused to recognize Louis IV as king of West Francia. As a result, Louis sent Hugh the Great who captured Auxerre and Sens. The Duchy of Burgundy was divided between Hugh the Great and Hugh the Black.

It is unknown whether Hugh married. He probably died without living offspring, as he was succeeded by Gilbert of Chalon, who became the ruler of the Duchy of Burgundy de facto (he was not duke de jure).

== See also ==
- Dukes of Burgundy family tree

Preceded by Rudolph	Duke of Burgundy 923 – 952	Succeeded by Gilbert
