= Pope Leo VII =

Head of the Catholic Church from 936 to 939

- Bishop of Rome
- Church: Catholic Church
- Papacy began: 3 January 936
- Papacy ended: 13 July 939
- Predecessor: John XI
- Successor: Stephen VIII
- Previous post: Cardinal-Priest of San Sisto (8 April 933-3 January 936)

Personal details
- Died: 13 July 939

Pope Leo VII (died 13 July 939) was the bishop of Rome and nominal ruler of the Papal States from 3 January 936 to his death.

== Election ==
Leo VII's election to the papacy in 936, after the death of Pope John XI, was secured by Alberic II of Spoleto, the ruler of Rome at the time. Alberic wanted to choose the pope so that the papacy would continue to yield to his authority. Leo was the priest of the church of San Sisto Vecchio in Rome, thought to be a Benedictine monk. He had little ambition towards the papacy, but consented under pressure.

== Pontificate ==
As pope, Leo VII reigned for only three years. Most of his bulls were grants of privilege to monasteries, especially including the Abbey of Cluny. Leo called for Odo of Cluny to mediate between Alberic and King Hugh of Italy. Odo was successful in negotiating a truce after arranging a marriage between Hugh's daughter Alda and Alberic. Leo VII also appointed Archbishop Frederick of Mainz as a reformer in Germany. Leo allowed Frederick to drive out Jews that refused to be baptized, but he did not endorse the forced baptism of Jews.

Leo VII died on 13 July 939, and was interred at St. Peter's Basilica. He was succeeded by Stephen VIII.

Catholic Church titles
Preceded by John XI	Pope; 936–939	Succeeded by Stephen VIII
