= Stephen I of Troyes =

Medieval French noble

Stephen I (died circa 1021) was Count of Troyes and Count of Meaux, in the Champagne region of modern-day France, after his father Herbert III, Count of Meaux. He died without issue. His titles passed to Odo II of Blois, his cousin.
