= Herbert III of Omois =

French noble

Herbert III d'Omois, Herbert the old, Heribert le Vieux (910 – 980/985) was count of Omois from 943 to his death.

He was the son of Herbert II, Count of Vermandois and Adela of France, daughter of King Robert I of France. In 943 after his father died, he succeeded as count of Omois "and received the fortress of Château-Thierry as well as the abbey of Saint-Médard, Soissons."

In 951, in his later years, he abducted and married Eadgifu of Wessex, daughter of Edward the Elder, King of England, and widow of Charles the Simple, King of West Francia.

He became a loyal follower of King Lothair who made him Count palatine. After his death, Lothair divided his estates between his nephews, Eudes I, Count of Blois and Herbert III, Count of Meaux.

Because he is sometimes referred to as "Herbert III of Vermandois, Count of Omois" he is often confused with his nephew Herbert III of Vermandois, Count of Vermandois who lived 953 to 1015, and was the son Adalbert I, Count of Vermandois.

== Sources ==
- Dunbabin, Jean (2005). France in the Making 843-1180. Oxford University Press.
- Riché, Pierre (1983). The Carolingians: A Family who Forged Europe. Translated by Allen, Michael Idomir. University of Pennsylvania Press.
