= Omois =

Coordinates: 49.05°N 3.40°E

Omois or the Omois (French pronunciation: [ɔmwa]) is the old name of a region in the extreme south of the department of Aisne in northern France, corresponding to the present arrondissement of Château-Thierry. It was formerly owned by the Counts of Omois.

The Omois includes part of the valley of the Marne, where 36 villages are included in the Champagne wine region appellation d'origine contrôlée.

== Sources and external links ==
- Website of the Pays du Sud de l'Aisne (in French)
- Bienvenue en Omois, personal website on Omois (in French)
