= Pope Marinus II =

Head of the Catholic Church from 942 to 946

- Bishop of Rome
- Church: Catholic Church
- Papacy began: 30 October 942
- Papacy ended: May 946
- Predecessor: Stephen VIII
- Successor: Agapetus II
- Previous post: Cardinal-Priest of San Ciriaco alle Terne

Personal details
- Born: Marinus Rome, Papal States
- Died: May 946 (aged 46) Rome, Papal States

Pope Marinus II (died May 946) was the bishop of Rome and ruler of the Papal States from 30 October 942 to his death. He ruled during the Saeculum obscurum. He was also erroneously called Pope Martin III (Latin: Martinus III) leading to the second pope named Martin taking the name Martin IV.

== Early career ==
Marinus was born in Rome, and prior to becoming pope he was attached to the Church of Saint Cyriacus in the Baths of Diocletian. He was said to have encountered Ulrich of Augsburg on his visit to Rome in 909, and reportedly predicted Ulrich's eventual appointment as bishop of Augsburg.

== Pontificate ==
Marinus was elevated to the papacy on 30 October 942 through intervention of Alberic II of Spoleto. This period is known as Saeculum obscurum due to the power of Alberic and his relatives over the popes. Marinus concentrated on administrative aspects of the papacy, and sought to reform both the secular and regular clergy. He extended the appointment of Archbishop Frederick of Mainz as papal vicar and missus dominicus throughout Germany and Francia. Marinus later intervened when the bishop of Capua seized without authorization a church which had been given to the local Benedictine monks. In fact, throughout his pontificate, Marinus favoured various monasteries, issuing a number of bulls in their favour.

Marinus occupied the palace built by Pope John VII atop the Palatine Hill in the ruins of the Domus Gaiana. He died in May 946 and was succeeded by Agapetus II.

== Name ==
Because of the similarity of the names Marinus and Martinus, Marinus I and Marinus II were, in some sources, mistakenly called Martinus II and Martinus III.

== Notes ==
Catholic Church titles
Preceded by Stephen VIII	Pope; 942–946	Succeeded by Agapetus II
