= Herbert II of Vermandois =

French nobleman (880-943)

Herbert II
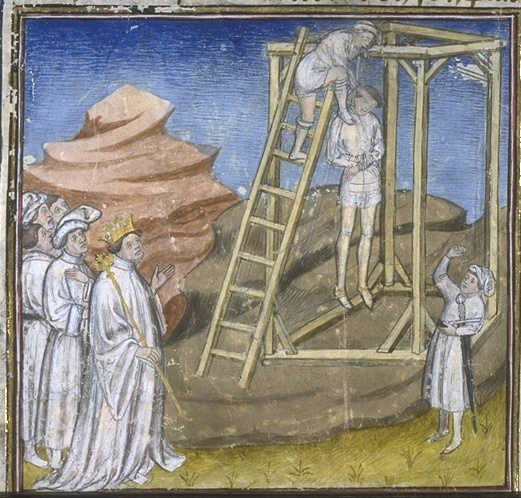
- Fictitious depiction of the execution of Herbert II

Count of Soissons
- Reign: 907-943
- Predecessor: Herbert I
- Successor: Herbert III of Omois

Count of Vermandois
- Reign: 907-943
- Predecessor: Herbert I
- Successor: Herbert III

Count of Meaux
- Predecessor: Herbert I
- Successor: Robert of Vermandois
- Born: c. 880
- Died: 943
- Issue Detail: see Family^{[a]}
- Dynasty: Carolingian (Herbertine Branch)
- Father: Herbert I

Herbert II (b. 880, d. 23 February 943) was Count of Vermandois, Count of Meaux, and Count of Soissons. He was the first to exercise power over the territory that became the province of Champagne.

== Life ==
Herbert was the son of Herbert I of Vermandois. He was apparently well aware of his descent from Charlemagne. Herbert inherited the titles of his father in 907: count of Soissons, count of Vermandois, including the positions of Lay abbot of St. Quentin and St. Médard entitling him to the income of those estates. His marriage with a daughter of king Robert I of France brought him the County of Meaux. He acquired the county of Beauvais on the death of his relative, Count Bernard.

In 922, when Seulf became Archbishop of Rheims, in an effort to appease Herbert II, Seulf solemnly promised Herbert II that he could nominate his successor. In 923, Count Herbert took the bold step of imprisoning King Charles III, who died still a captive in 929. (Note: King Charles was the godfather to one of Herbert II's sons.) Then, on the death of Seulf in 925, with the help of King Rudolph, he acquired for his second son Hugh (then five years old) the archbishopric of Rheims. Herbert took the additional step of sending emissaries to Rome to Pope John X to gain his approval, which that pope gave in 926. On his election young Hugh was sent to Auxerre to study.

In 926, on the death of Count Roger I of Laon. Herbert demanded this countship for Eudes, his eldest son. He took the town in defiance of King Rudolph leading to a clash between the two in 927. Using the threat of releasing King Charles III, whom he held captive, Herbert managed to hold the city for four more years.

But after the death of Charles in 929, Rudolph again attacked Laon in 931 successfully defeating Herbert. The same year the king entered Rheims and defeated archbishop Hugh, the son of Herbert. Artaud became the new archbishop of Reims. Herbert II then lost, in three years, Vitry, Laon, Château-Thierry, and Soissons. The intervention of his ally, Henry the Fowler, allowed him to restore his domains (except Rheims and Laon) in exchange for his submission to King Rudolph.

Later Herbert allied with Hugh the Great and William Longsword, duke of Normandy against King Louis IV, who allocated the County of Laon to Roger II, the son of Roger I, in 941. Herbert and Hugh the Great took back Rheims and captured Artaud. Hugh, the son of Herbert, was restored as archbishop. Again the mediation of the German King Otto I in Visé, near Liège, in 942 allowed for the normalization of the situation.

== Death and legacy ==
Herbert II died on 23 February 943 at Saint-Quentin (the capital of the county of Vermandois) from natural causes. The story of him being hanged by king Louis IV (see fig. above) during a hunt is fictitious. (Note: This dramatic report of Herbert II’s death seems to be fiction. It comes from Folcwin’s Deeds of the Abbots of St. Bertin, which was penned years later, circa 960, during the reign of Louis IV’s son Lothar III (954-986). Flodoard of Reims, whose contemporary annals provide the most reliable political narrative for Louis IV’s reign, gives no indication that the king played a role in Herbert’s death.“) His vast estates and territories were divided among his sons. Vermandois and Amiens went to the two elder sons while Robert and Herbert, the younger sons, were given the valuable holdings scattered throughout Champagne. On Robert's death his brother's son Herbert III inherited them all. Herbert III's only son Stephen died childless in 1019–20 thus ending the male line of Herbert II.

== Family ==
Herbert married Adèle, daughter of Robert I of France. (Note: "Heribert’s wife was Adele, the sister of Hugh the Great.") They had:

- Eudes of Vermandois, b. 910, d. 946, the count of Amiens and of Vienne
- Adalbert I, Count of Vermandois, b. 915, d. 987, who married Gerberge of Lorraine
- Adela of Vermandois, b. 910, d. 960, who in 934 married Arnulf I of Flanders
- Herbert the Elder, b. 910, d. 980, Count of Omois who in 951 abducted and married Eadgifu of Wessex
- Robert of Vermandois, d. 967, Count of Meaux and Troyes
- Luitgarde of Vermandois, b. 915, d. 978, who in 940 married William Longsword, and then in 943 married Theobald I of Blois
- Hugh of Vermandois, b. 920, d. 962, the Archbishop of Reims

== Sources ==
- Bradbury, Jim (2007). The Capetians: Kings of France, 987–1328. Hambledon Continuum.
- Duckett, Eleanor Shipley (1967). Death and life in the tenth century. University of Michigan Press.
- Dunbabin, Jean (1985). France in the Making 843-1180. Oxford University Press.
- Fanning, Steven; Bachrach, Bernard S., eds. (2011). The Annals of Flodoard of Reims, 916–966. University of Toronto Press.
- Glaber, Rodulfus (1989). France, John (ed.). The Five Books of the Histories. The Clarendon Press.
- Goldberg, Eric J. (2020). In the Manner of the Franks: Hunting, Kingship, and Masculinity in Early Medieval Europe. University of Pennsylvania Press.
- Marignan, Albert; Platon, Jean Georges; Wilmotte, Maurice; Prou, Maurice, eds. (1906). Le Moyen âge (in French). Librairie Ancienne Honore Champion, Editeur.
- McKitterick, Rosamond (1999). The Frankish Kingdoms under the Carolingians, 751-987. Longman.
- Norgate, Kate (1890). "Odo of Champagne, Count of Blois and Tyrant of Burgundy". The English Historical Review. 5 (19 (July)).
- Taitz, Emily (1994). The Jews of Medieval France: The Community of Champagne. Greenwood Press.
