= Seulf (archbishop of Reims) =

Historical Roman Catholic religious leader

Seulfe de Reims (or Sculfe) was a prelate of the Roman Catholic Church who died in 925 as Archbishop of Reims.

== Biography ==
Seulfe was a disciple of Remi d'Auxerre and he was the Archdeacon of the Church of Reims. He was elected, in 922, to the death of Hervee, with the consent of King Robert, and consecrated by Abbon, bishop of Soissons.

In 923 he sent for the pallium to Pope John X. who addressed it to him with letters confirming the privileges of his Church.

Archbishop Seulfe, who was of a haughty and proud character, having imagined that Odon and Hervee, one brother and the other nephew of his predecessor Hervee, lacked the respect and fidelity which they had, as vassals of the Church of Reims, summoned them to come and justify themselves or to fight in duel to prove their innocence. They did neither one nor the other. On their refusal, after having deprived them of the property which they held in fiefs of the Church of Reims, they alone imprisoned them. This procession rendered this prelate odious, and it was published that, in order to obtain the detention of these two lords, he had promised the Earl of Vermandois to have his son archbishop of Reims elected.

He died in 925 from the consequences of a violent poison, which is supposed to have been given to him by Count Herbert; the latter was in a hurry that the archiepiscopal see of Reims returned to his son Hugues, then five years old.
