= Robert of Vermandois =

Count of Troyes
- Reign: 946–966
- Predecessor: Giselbert of Burgundy
- Successor: Herbert III, Count of Meaux

Count of Meaux
- Reign: 956–966
- Predecessor: Herbert II of Vermandois
- Successor: Herbert III, Count of Meaux
- Born: before 920
- Died: after June 966
- Spouse: Adelais Werra
- Issue: Herbert III, Count of Meaux; Adele of Meaux
- House: Carolingian
- Father: Herbert II of Vermandois
- Mother: Adele of France

Robert of Vermandois (before 931 – after June 966) was Count of Meaux from 946 to his death and Count of Troyes from 956 to his death.

== Life ==
Robert was son of Herbert II, Count of Vermandois and his wife, Adele of France, daughter of Robert I of France. Robert succeeded his father as Count of Meaux in 946 and became Count of Troyes in 956. His son Herbert III of Meaux succeeded as Count of Troyes and Meaux upon Robert's death c. 967.

In 959, he captured the city of Dijon and expelled the bishop, but he was attacked in 960 by the kings Lothair of France and Otto the Great and had to submit.

== Family ==
Robert married Adelais Werra of Burgundy (914–967), daughter of Giselbert of Burgundy. They had:

- Herbert III, Count of Meaux (c. 935 – 995)
- Adele of Meaux (c. 935 – c. 982)

== Sources ==
- McKitterick, Rosamond (1999). The Frankish Kingdoms under the Carolingians, 751-987. Longman.

Preceded by Heribert II	Count of Meaux; 946–967	Succeeded by Heribert III
