= Artald of Reims =

French archbishop (died 961)

Artald of Reims (died October 1, 961) was twice Archbishop of Reims. He held the post first 931 to 940, when he was displaced by Hugh of Vermandois. He was restored, with the help of Louis IV of France, in 946.

== Biography ==
In 931 he was imposed as bishop by Ralph, King of the West Franks, as part of Ralph's struggle against Herbert II, Count of Vermandois. In 936 Artald anointed Louis King at Laon. In 940 he was allowed to operate a mint.

In the same year, however, Herbert of Vermandois in alliance with Hugh the Great pushed Artald out of Reims by force. A local synod then deposed Artald, and Hugh (son of Herbert) became bishop once more.

Artald's return in 946 was supported by Louis and Otto I, King of the East Franks. It was ratified by a 948 synod at Ingelheim. The events of the time are narrated in a chronicle by Flodoard, who was close to Artald. They had spent some of Artald's time in exile together, supported by Rotbert of Trier.

Catholic Church titles
Preceded by Hugh of Vermandois	Archbishop of Reims; 931–940	Succeeded by Hugh of Vermandois
Preceded by Hugh of Vermandois	Archbishop of Reims; 946–961	Succeeded by Odalric
