= Rudolph of France =

King of West Francia from 923 to 936

Rudolph
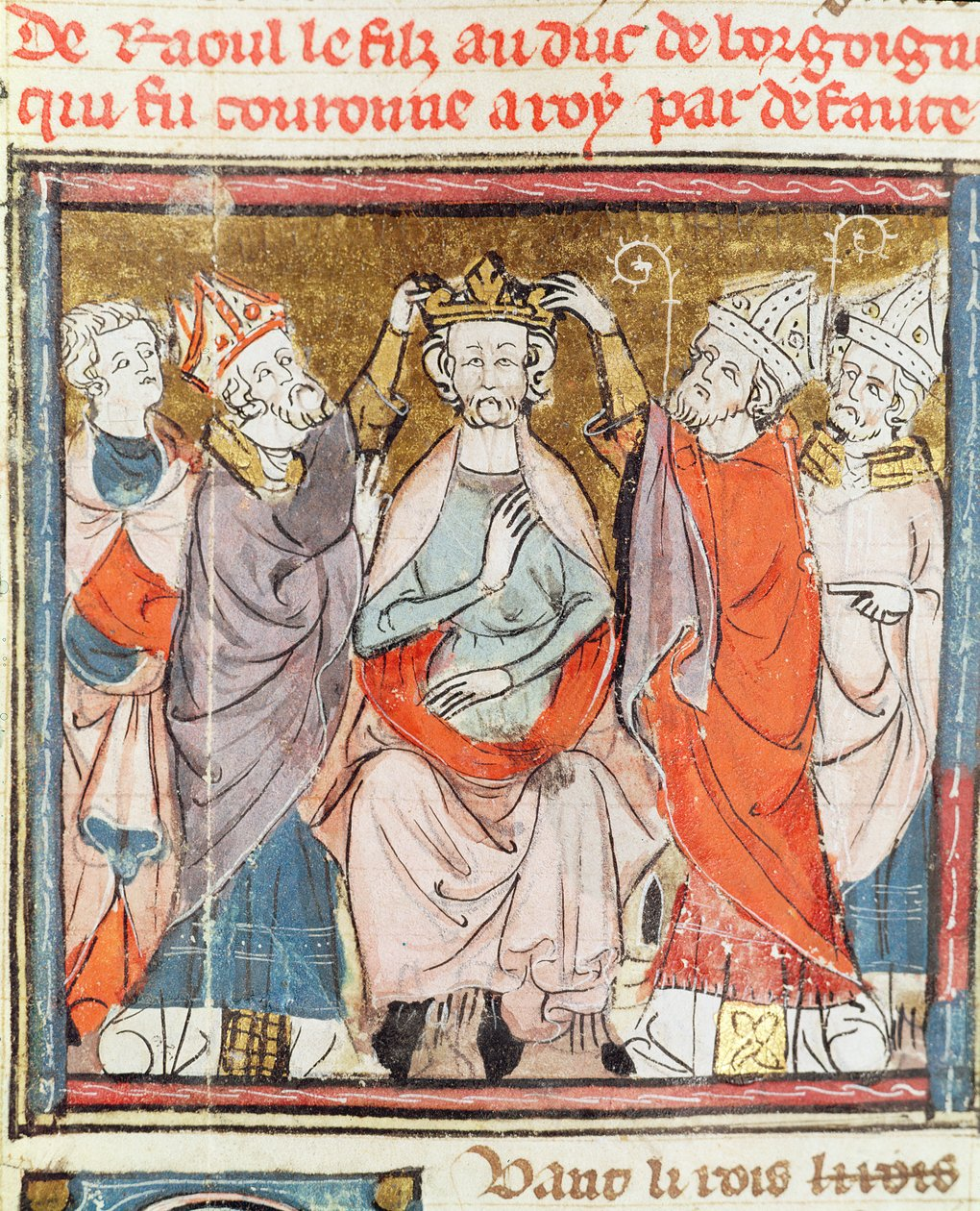

King of West Francia
- Reign: 13 July 923 – 14/15 January 936
- Coronation: 13 July 923, St Médard, Soissons
- Predecessor: Robert I
- Successor: Louis IV
- Born: c. 890
- Died: 14/15 January 936 (c. aged 45–46); Auxerre
- Burial: Abbey of Sainte-Colombe, Saint-Denis-lès-Sens
- Spouse: Emma of France
- House: Bivinids
- Father: Richard the Justiciar
- Mother: Adelaide of Auxerre

Rudolph (French: Rodolphe), sometimes called Ralph (French: Raoul; c. 890 – 14/15 January 936), was the king of West Francia (France) from 923 until his death in 936. He was elected to succeed his father-in-law, Robert I, and spent much of his reign defending his realm from Viking raids.

== Name ==
In contemporary Latin documents, his name is usually Rodulfus, from the Germanic roots hruod, "fame, glory", and wulf, "wolf". Rodulf and Rudolf are variants of this name; the French form is Rodolphe. By contrast, the king is normally known as Raoul in modern French, a name which derives from Radulfus, from Germanic rad, "counsel", and wulf (whence Ralph). Although this name is of different origin, it was sometimes used interchangeably by contemporaries with Rodulfus. The king himself, however, always used Rodulfus, as on his personal seal. Nonetheless, he is sometimes called Ralph (from Raoul) or Radulf in English.

== Background ==
Rudolph was born around 890, the son of Richard the Justiciar and Adelaide of Auxerre. He inherited the Duchy of Burgundy from his father in 921 and married Emma, daughter of King Robert I of France. He was elected to succeed his father-in-law, who was killed at the Battle of Soissons against the deposed King Charles the Simple. He was crowned by Walter, the archbishop of Sens, at Saint-Médard de Soissons on 13 July 923. On assuming the crown he passed the Duchy of Burgundy to his younger brother, Hugh the Black.

== Reign ==
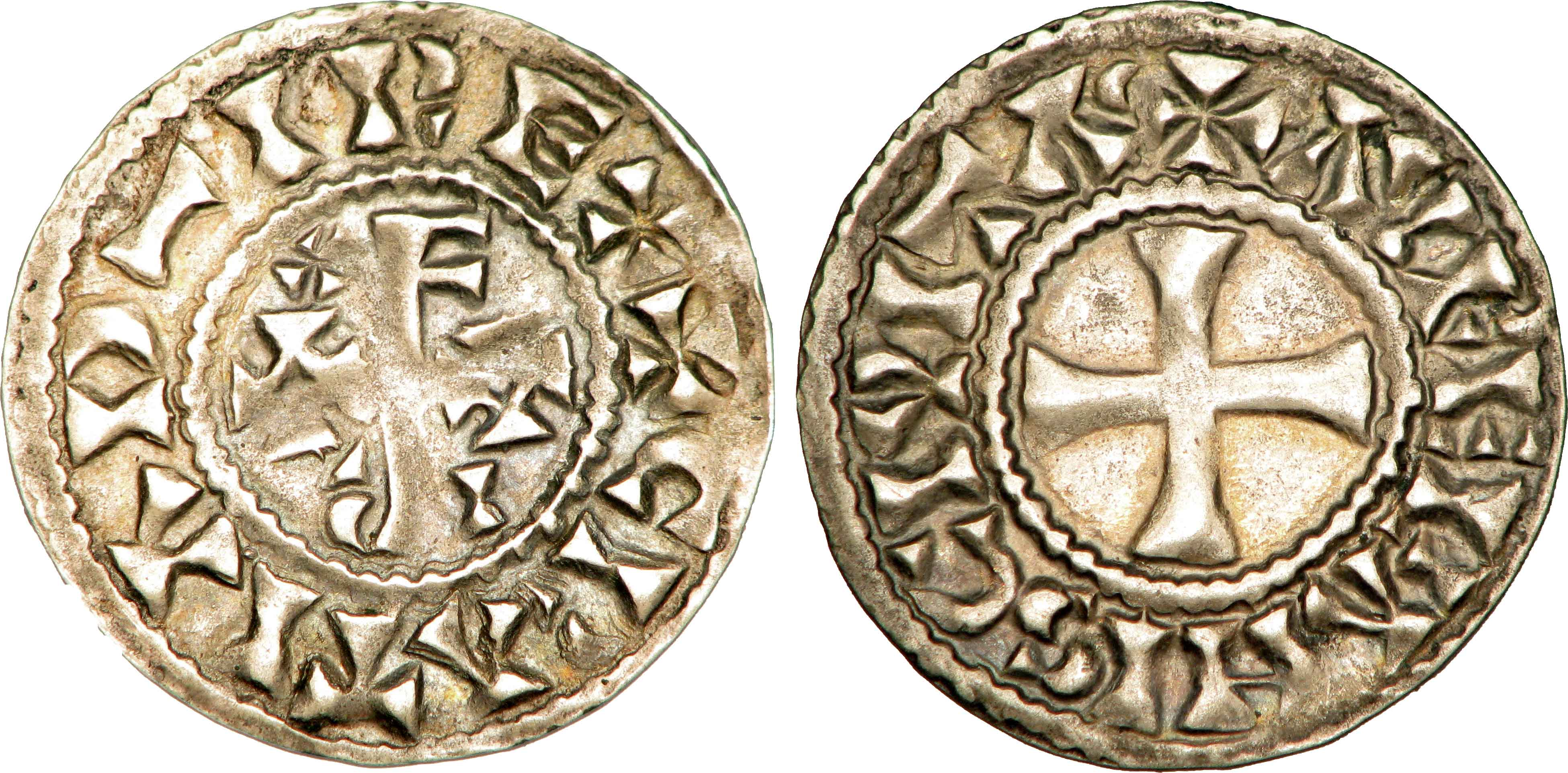
Denier of Rudolph

Rudolph's first act was to lead an army against the king of East Francia Henry the Fowler, who had made a pact with King Robert I at Jülich earlier in the year. After trying to annex Lotharingia Henry met Rudolph with a considerably-sized army and made peace again. However, in 925 Henry attacked Gilbert, Duke of Lorraine, and took over Lotharingia permanently, Rudolph being in no position to resist.

In 924 Vikings made a fresh series of raids into West Francia. From the Loire Valley they threatened Hugh the Great, brother of Queen Emma, but Rudolph did nothing. They attacked Burgundy, the domain of Rudolph's brother, but were repelled, and moved on to Melun, where they threatened the royal lands. Joined only by his ecclesiastic vassals and Herbert, Rudolph recruited troops in Burgundy, while Hugh the Great was convinced to join him. After the Vikings left, the Normans, whom Charles the Simple had settled in Duchy of Normandy in 911, began ravaging that whole region. Herbert and Arnulf I of Flanders joined Rudolph and together they took Eu, but were ambushed near Fauquembergues where the king was wounded, the count of Ponthieu killed, and many Normans left dead on the field.

Also in that year, Rudolph conversed with Louis the Blind, king of Provence, over the Magyars, the newest barbarian migrants to Europe, then menacing Louis. In 930 Magyars invaded the region around Rheims, but left before the king could engage them. In 935 Magyars invaded Burgundy and Rudolph brought a large army against them, causing their retreat without a battle. West Francia was temporarily safe from both Vikings and Magyars at Rudolph's death.

In order to increase his own power, Herbert II of Vermandois used his royal prisoner as a bargaining tool to secure the Archbishopric of Rheims for his son Hugh in 925 and the County of Laon for his son Odo in 927. The complaints from Rudolph led Herbert II to bring Charles before William Longsword, the count of Rouen, for homage and then to Rheims to press Charles' claim on Pope John X. In 928 Herbert II finally got possession of Laon, but the next year Charles died at Péronne and Herbert II lost his leverage against Rudolph.

After defeating Vikings of the Limousin, Rudolph received the allegiance of the Aquitainians and homage from William Longsword, to whom he granted in 933 the islands off the coast of Normandy, now referred to as the Channel Islands. Rudolph was not fully recognized as king in the south until the death of Charles the Simple in captivity on 7 October 929. Private charters from the south date the start of his reign from this point.

In 929 Rudolph attempted to reduce the power of Duke Ebalus of Aquitaine. He withdrew from him access to Berry, and in 932 granted the title of prince of Gothia to the count of Toulouse, Raymond Pons, and his brother of Rouergue, Ermengol. He also transferred the County of Auvergne to Raymond. Moreover, the territory of the march which was under the control of the lord of Charroux was transformed into an independent county. Later, however, Rudolph was campaigning with Ebalus in the south to eradicate the last Viking strongholds there. He then proceeded aggressively against Herbert II, marching into Rheims and replacing Hugh with Artald in 931. Then, joined by Hugh the Great, Rudolph burned Herbert's fortresses and cornered him in Château-Thierry, where he had first imprisoned Charles, from 933 to 934. The two made peace in 935 and Rudolph fell ill, dying a few months later on 14 or 15 January 936, leaving no sons.

== Sources ==
- Chisholm, Hugh, ed. (1911). "Rudolph, king of the Franks" . Encyclopædia Britannica. Vol. 23 (11th ed.). Cambridge University Press.
- Dufour, Jean (1978). Recueil des actes de Robert Ier et de Raoul, rois de France: 922–936 (in French). Imprimerie nationale.
- McKitterick, Rosamond (1999). The Frankish Kingdoms under the Carolingians. Longman.
- Tanner, Heather (2004). Families, Friends and Allies: Boulogne and Politics in Northern France and. Brill.
- Gwatking, H. M., Whitney, J. P., et al. Cambridge Medieval History: Volume III – Germany and the Western Empire. Cambridge University Press: London, 1930.

Preceded by Richard	Duke of Burgundy; 921–923	Succeeded by Hugh
Preceded by Robert I	King of West Francia; 923–936	Succeeded by Louis IV
