= Gilbert, Duke of Burgundy =

Frankish noble

Gilbert (or Giselbert) of Chalon (died 8 April 956) was count of Chalon, Autun, Troyes, Avallon and Dijon, and duke of Burgundy between 952 and 956. He became the ruler of the Duchy of Burgundy de facto (he was not Duke de jure). By his wife Ermengarde, he had two daughters: Adelais and Liutgarde. Gilbert never managed to maintain the independence of the duchy in the struggles for power of 10th-century France. In 952, he became a vassal of Hugh the Great, count of Paris, and married his oldest daughter, Liutgard, to Hugh's son Otto of Paris. Adelais married Robert of Vermandois.

== Sources ==
- Bourchard, Constance B. (2001). Those of my Blood: Constructing Noble Families in Medieval Francia. University of Pennsylvania Press.

== See also ==
- Gislebertus

Preceded by Hugh	Duke of Burgundy; 952–956	Succeeded by Otto
