= Siege of Chartres (911) =

Viking invasion in Burgundy – repelled by Frankish forces

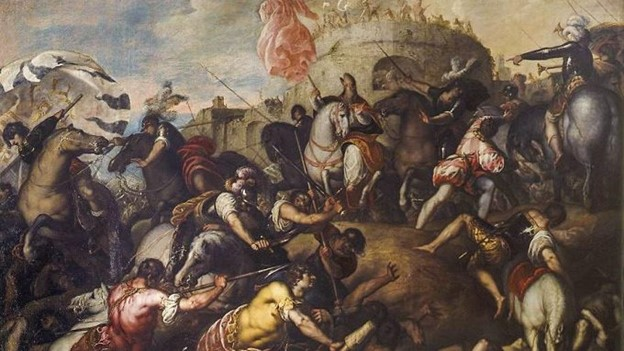
- Painting of the siege, 1618, by Padovanino
Date	July 20, 911 (Note: The date of the battle is hard to pin down because of various author's unreliability for the information. Dudo especially has a history of Rollo that embellishes many of the tales. The date and event of the battle is confirmed however by the Annals of Ste. Colobe of Sens. As such this article has given the date of 20 July 911 listed therein.)
Location	Chartres, West Francia (now in Eure-et-Loir, France) 48.456°N 1.484°E
Result	West Frankish victory: Treaty of Saint-Clair-sur-Epte Rollo is granted lands in northern France in exchange of an oath of fealty, religious conversion and a pledge to defend the Seine's estuary from Viking raiders
Territorial changes	The County of Rouen is established

Belligerents
West Franks	Vikings

Commanders and leaders
Robert I of France; Richard, Duke of Burgundy; Bishop Gantelme; Ebles, Count of Poitiers; Manassès, Count of Dijon	Rollo

Strength
8,000	20,000

Casualties and losses
Light	At least 1,600 killed in the fighting with Robert's heavy cavalry Unknown wounded Most of the army captured

The siege of Chartres took place in spring 911 during the age of Viking incursions in Europe. The Viking leader, Rollo, and his men laid siege to the city of Chartres, in West Francia. They failed to achieve their goal before the arrival of a relief army in July 911, at which point an engagement ensued which resulted in the defeat of the Norsemen. Despite the frequent occurrence of Viking raids against the Frankish realms, their failure to succeed in this siege would prove to have everlasting consequences on European history.

Following Rollo's defeat, the King of the West Franks, Charles the Simple, granted him a territory in the northern lands of his kingdom in exchange of an oath of fealty and his religious conversion. This territory, located between the mouth of the Seine and Rouen, a city Rollo had previously raided and seized in 876, officially formed the fief known as the County of Rouen. This county, through kinship in the decades to come, would expand into what came to be known as the Duchy of Normandy.

== Prelude ==
Vikings had previously raided and burned down Chartres in 858. As a result, the town's defenses were rebuilt and strengthened. In the 53 years between the sieges, Chartres had been fortified with trapezoidal structure and had undergone no direct attacks. Rollo and his followers, who likely had been conducting a raiding campaign in north central West Francia launched the siege of Chartres in spring 911 (either April or May). The city defenders were led by a bishop named Gantelme. In summer 911, he would be joined by a relief army under Robert I of France, Richard, Duke of Burgundy, Ebles, Count of Poitiers and Manassès, Count of Dijon.

== Siege ==
Rollo initiated the siege by isolating the town and depriving it of resources. This was achieved by burning down the surrounding area. As for the siege itself, it seems to have been carried out initially by Rollo setting up camp in the Eure valley. In this way, the Norse chieftain ensured easy access to supplies and command of both banks of the little Eure river. They had also prepared mobile shelters but these would be rendered useless by the arrival of the relief army in July 911. As previously stated the fortified town of Chartres had the appearance of a trapezoid. One side, on the steep heights protected by the Eure River, was inaccessible. Two others, though less strong, still presented a natural defense. But the two valleys leading off from the Eure eventually reached the plateau at the point where the Place des Épars in Chartres is located today. This was the weak point, the attackable curtain wall, and probably the fortress wall re-established by the inhabitants of Chartres after the disaster of 858.

The Norsemen attacked the town with the artillery of the time. Assaults were initiated to seize the city but little is known about the circumstances surrounding these attempts. It is, however, certain the Norsemen had failed to achieve their goal before the arrival of the relief army in July. The West Frankish forces were made up of Frenchmen, (Note: "Frenchmen" references troops gathered from the Crown lands of France, or more specifically, at the time, men hailing from the Île-de-France region) Burgundians and Aquitanians. These troops had chosen a concentration point south-east of Chartres. Their primary leaders included Duke Robert, Duke Richard of Burgundy and Count Ebles of Poitiers.

According to legend, Bishop Gantelme, dressed in his vestments as if to say mass, exposed the Virgin's tunic (a holy relic supposedly worn by the Virgin Mary) on the ramparts. The Norsemen had begun shooting arrows at the ecclesiastical group as soon as it appeared on the ramparts; but soon they fell blinded, and their leaders had no thought but to flee. Gantelme then ordered and led a sortie of iron-clad men who took the besiegers at their backs and finished enveloping them. In reality, the tunic may have simply served as a distraction for the town's garrison. The bishop appeared from the remparts, displaying the insignia of the Virgin's tunic. Then, the besieged troops, exiting through several gates, caught the Norsemen, who were struggling to cope with Robert's horsemen, on the back foot. The bulk of the Viking army, enveloped, was reduced to surrender and the highest-ranking of the Norsemen present taken prisoner.

But Rollo, who had abandoned his men, was able to escape with a handful of his companions. Furious at his failure, he fled to Jeufosse and then returned to Rouen. He was followed by a small company, which had initially taken refuge in Lèves, but eventually managed to escape.

== Aftermath ==
The victory at Chartres was followed by an attempt to convert the Norsemen of the lower valley of the Seine and the West Franks went further. The clergy, well inspired after the blow dealt to Rollo, had judged the moment favorable to enter into peace negotiations, which led to the famous Treaty of Saint-Clair-sur-Epte. The Norsemen had been formidable enough to persuade Charles the Simple that they might become valuable allies. The contemporary sources present, on the whole, serious difficulties, but it remains certain that a link exists between Robert's battle with Rollo and the latter's conversion to Christianity.

In 1618 the Italian painter Padovanino painted a version of the event which now hangs in the Pinacoteca di Brera.

== Treaty of Saint-Clair-sur-Epte ==
The treaty of Saint-Clair-sur-Epte was agreed on between Rollo and Charles the Simple, who met personally to discuss the terms. Rollo was granted the land around the mouth of the Seine and Rouen. This marked the establishment of what would become the Duchy of Normandy and the genesis of the Normans. In exchange of his new fief, Rollo swore loyalty to the King of West Francia, was baptized and promised to defend the Seine's estuary from other Viking raiders.
