= Treaty of Bonn =

921 treaty between West and East Francia

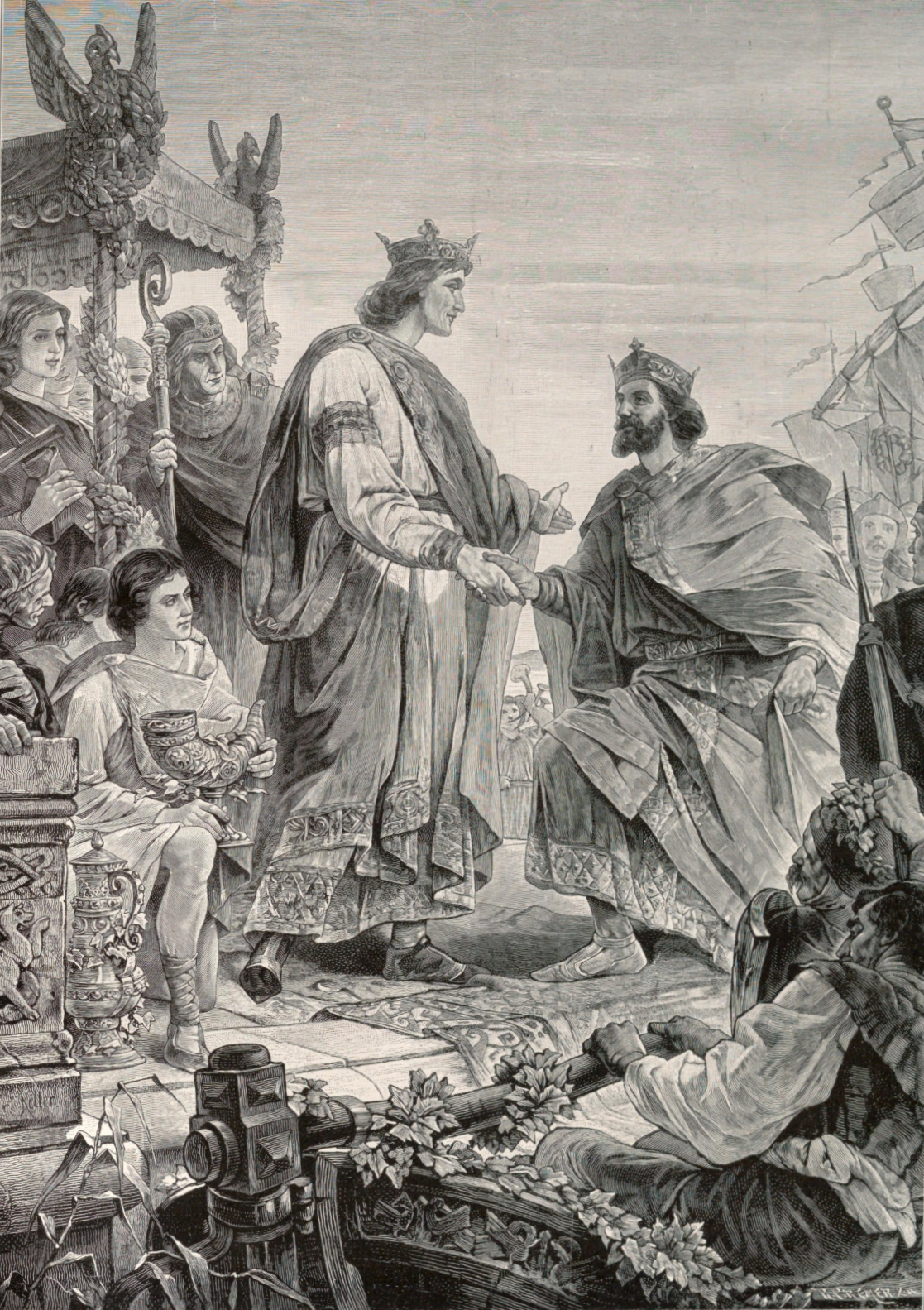
Romantic 19th-century depiction of the meeting between the two kings at Bonn in 921.

On 7 November 921, the Treaty of Bonn, the text of which calls itself a "pact of friendship" (amicitia), was signed between Charles III of France and Henry I of Germany in a minimalist ceremony aboard a ship in the middle of the Rhine not far from Bonn. The use of the river, which was the border between their two kingdoms, as a neutral territory had extensive Carolingian precedents and was also used in classical antiquity and in contemporary Anglo-Saxon England.

== Terms ==
The treaty, which "more than most such amicitiae, was decidedly bilateral, reciprocal and equal", recognised the border of the two realms and the authority of their respective kings. It confirmed the legitimacy of Henry's election by the German princes and of Charles's rule over Lotharingia through the election by its princes. In the treaty, Henry is titled rex Francorum orientalium (King of the East Franks) and Charles rex Francorum occidentalium (King of the West Franks) in recognition of the division it made of the former Frankish Empire. Charles and his bishops and counts signed first, both because he had been king longer and because he was of Carolingian stock.

== Effects ==
The treaty was ineffective. In January or early February 923, Henry made a pact of amicitia with the usurper Robert I against Charles, who subsequently sent a legate to Henry with the relic of the hand of Dionysius the Areopagite, sheathed in gold and studded in gems, "as a sign of faith and truth [and] a pledge of perpetual union and mutual love" in the words of Widukind of Corvey. Charles probably intended to recall Henry to the terms of the treaty of Bonn and draw him away from Robert. In June 923, Charles was captured at the Battle of Soissons and lost his kingdom. By 925, Henry had annexed Lotharingia.

== Editions ==
The earliest edition of the treaty of Bonn was published by Heribert Rosweyde, followed by another from Jacques Sirmond (1623). Later, for the Monumenta Germaniae Historica, it was edited by Georg Pertz, but the definitive edition came out later in that series:

- Ludwig Weiland, ed. Constitutiones et acta publica imperatorum et regum inde ab anno DCCCXI usque ad annum MCXCVII (911–1197), MGH LL. Constitutiones 1 (Hanover: 1893), 1 – 2, no. 1.
