= Battle of Soissons (923) =

Battle over the throne of West Francia

Coordinates: 49°22′54″N 3°19′25″E

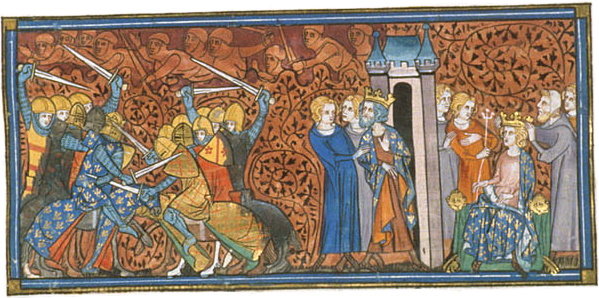
- 14th-century depiction of (left from right): the Battle of Soissons, imprisonment of Charles III and the coronation of Rudolph.
Date	June 15, 923
Location	Soissons, Aisne
Result	Robertian victory: Death of Robert I; Capture of Charles III; Succession of Rudolph, Duke of Burgundy to the throne.

Belligerents
Carolingians	Robertians

Commanders and leaders
Charles III (POW); Count Fulbert; Hagano; Hagrold; Normans	Robert I †; Rudolph, Duke of Burgundy; Herbert II of Vermandois; Gilbert of Lorraine; Hugh the Great

Strength
14.000 (estimated)	20.000 (estimated)

Casualties and losses
7,118	11,969 Dead

The Battle of Soissons was fought on 15 June 923 between an alliance of Frankish insurgent nobles led by Robert I, elected king in an assembly the year prior, and an army composed of Lotharingians, Normans, and Carolingian forces under King Charles III's command. The battle took place at Soissons, near Aisne. Robert was killed, but his army won the war. Charles was imprisoned by Herbert II of Vermandois and held captive until his death in 929. Rudolph, Duke of Burgundy, Robert's son-in-law, succeeded him as ruler of West Francia.

After Charlemagne's death, the Carolingian royal authority began to decline due to the constant invasions of the Vikings, civil wars and strife with vassals, mainly the Robertians. Since its beginning, the political situation of Charles's reign was fragile. Frankish nobility was unwilling to accept his authority. One of his few allies was Baldwin II of Flanders. Charles' attempts to restore Carolingian power over Lotharingia, the homeland of his ancestors and first wife Frederonne, led him to be chosen as King of Lotharingia in 911 and to a conflict of interest with the local nobility such as Gilbert of Lorraine.

After 918 the aristocracy of West Francia began to show its disagreement with Charles' governance. The main reason was the increasing power of Hagano, a Lotharingian noble who was the king's favorite counselor. In 920 a group of Frankish nobles led by Robert, brother of the previous king Odo, abducted Charles. They tried to force him to dismiss Hagano, but Archbishop Herveus of Reims convinced the insurgents to free the king.

The military uprising of the Frankish magnates broke out in 922. Charles had removed from his aunt Rothilde, daughter of Charles II the Bald, the benefit of the abbey of Chelles and transferred it to Hagano. This act directly affected the Robertians' interests, since Rothilde was the mother-in-law of Robert's son, Hugh the Great. In an assembly at Soissons on June 29, the rebellious nobles deposed Charles and elected Robert as their king. Archbishop Walter of Sens crowned him the next day in Reims.
