= Duchy of Normandy =

Medieval duchy in Western Europe (911–1290)

Coordinates: 49°9′N 0°6′E

Duchy of Normandy Duchie de Normaundie (Norman) Ducatus Normanniae (Latin)
- 911–1290
- Heraldic flag of Normandy Coat of arms

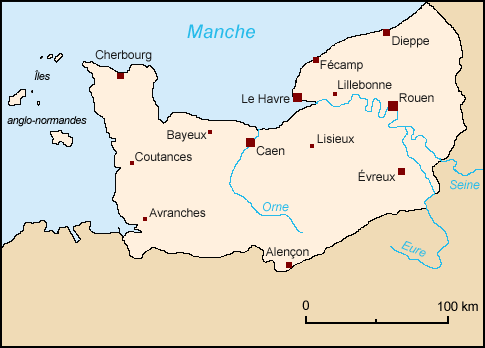
- Normandy's historical borders in the northwest of France and the Channel Islands
- Status: Vassal state of West Francia (911–987); Vassal state of the Kingdom of France (987–1204); Personal union with the Kingdom of England (1066–1290)
- Capital: Rouen
- Official languages: Medieval Latin
- Common languages: Old Norman; Old Norse (until the early-mid 11th century)
- Religion: Roman Catholicism; Norse religion
- Demonym: Normans
- Government: Feudal monarchy
- Duke of Normandy
  - 911–927: Rollo (first)
  - 1035–1087: William the Conqueror
  - 1144–1150: Geoffrey Plantagenet
  - 1199–1204: John (last)
- Historical era: Middle Ages
  - Treaty of Saint-Clair-sur-Epte: 911
  - Continental Normandy conquered by Philip II: 1204
  - Treaty of Paris cedes continental Normandy to the French Crown: 1259
  - Split into Guernsey and Jersey: 1290
- Currency: Denier (Rouen penny)
Preceded by
Kingdom of Brittany
West Francia
Succeeded by
Kingdom of France
Bailiwick of Guernsey
Jersey
- Today part of: France: Normandy; British Islands: Guernsey; Jersey

The Duchy of Normandy grew out of the 911 Treaty of Saint-Clair-sur-Epte between King Charles III of West Francia and the Viking leader Rollo. The duchy was named for its inhabitants, the Normans.

From 1066 until 1204, as a result of the Norman Conquest of England, the dukes of Normandy were usually also kings of England, the only exceptions being Dukes Robert Curthose (1087–1106), Geoffrey Plantagenet (1144–1150), and Henry II (1150–1152), who became king of England in 1154.

In 1202, Philip II of France declared Normandy forfeit to him and seized it by force of arms in 1204 (with the exception of the Channel Islands). It remained disputed territory until 1259, when the English sovereign ceded his claim to mainland Normandy which was absorbed into the French royal domain.

In the Kingdom of France, the duchy was occasionally set apart as an appanage to be ruled by a member of the royal family. After 1469, however, it was permanently united to the royal domain, although the title was occasionally conferred as an honorific upon junior members of the royal family. The last French duke of Normandy in this sense was Louis-Charles, duke from 1785 to 1792.

The title "Duke of Normandy" continues to be used in an informal manner in the Channel Islands (insular Normandy), to refer to the monarch of the United Kingdom. There is no definite end as to when the Duchy of Normandy (with its remnants in the Channel Islands) as a vassal of the English monarch became 'part' of the United Kingdom, with history blending the link between the two gradually. In official documents in Guernsey, the British monarch is entitled "Duke of Normandy", while in official documents in Jersey, the British monarch is ambiguously titled Sovereign. As such, although no form of the Duchy or its structure exists, there has never been a formal end to the "duke's" rule over the islands.

== Etymology ==
Medieval Latin documents referred to the inhabitants as Nortmanni, which means "men of the North". This name provides the etymological basis for the modern words "Norman" and "Normandy", with -ia (Normandia, like Neustria, Francia, etc.). After 911, this name replaced the term Neustria, which had formerly been used to describe the region that included Normandy. The other parts of Neustria became known as France (now Île-de-France), Anjou and Champagne. The rate of Scandinavian colonization can be seen in the Norman toponymy and in the changes in popular family names.

== History ==
=== Viking raids on the Seine ===
From the late eighth century, Scandinavian Viking raiders targeted the coasts of northern Gaul and started to raid along the river Seine during the 9th century with the first Viking attack up the Seine river taking place in 820.

Monastic centres such as Jumièges Abbey and Saint-Wandrille were plundered repeatedly; Rouen itself was attacked and temporarily abandoned in 841.

As early as 841, a Viking fleet appeared at the mouth of the Seine, the principal route by which they entered the kingdom. After attacking and destroying monasteries they took advantage of the power vacuum created by the disintegration of Charlemagne's empire to occupy Northern France.

Viking fleets exploited the navigability of the Seine and its tributaries, sailing upriver to raid Paris in 845 under a leader recorded as Ragnar. Annals such as the Annales Bertiniani describe the devastation of monasteries and towns and the payment of tribute by Frankish rulers to secure temporary peace.

Over time, groups of Scandinavians began to overwinter in the lower Seine valley, constructing fortified encampments and establishing trading outposts. Archaeological finds of weapon deposits, silver hoards and Scandinavian-style burials indicate semi-permanent settlement before 911, and there were even small Viking settlements on the lower Seine.

=== Norman rule ===
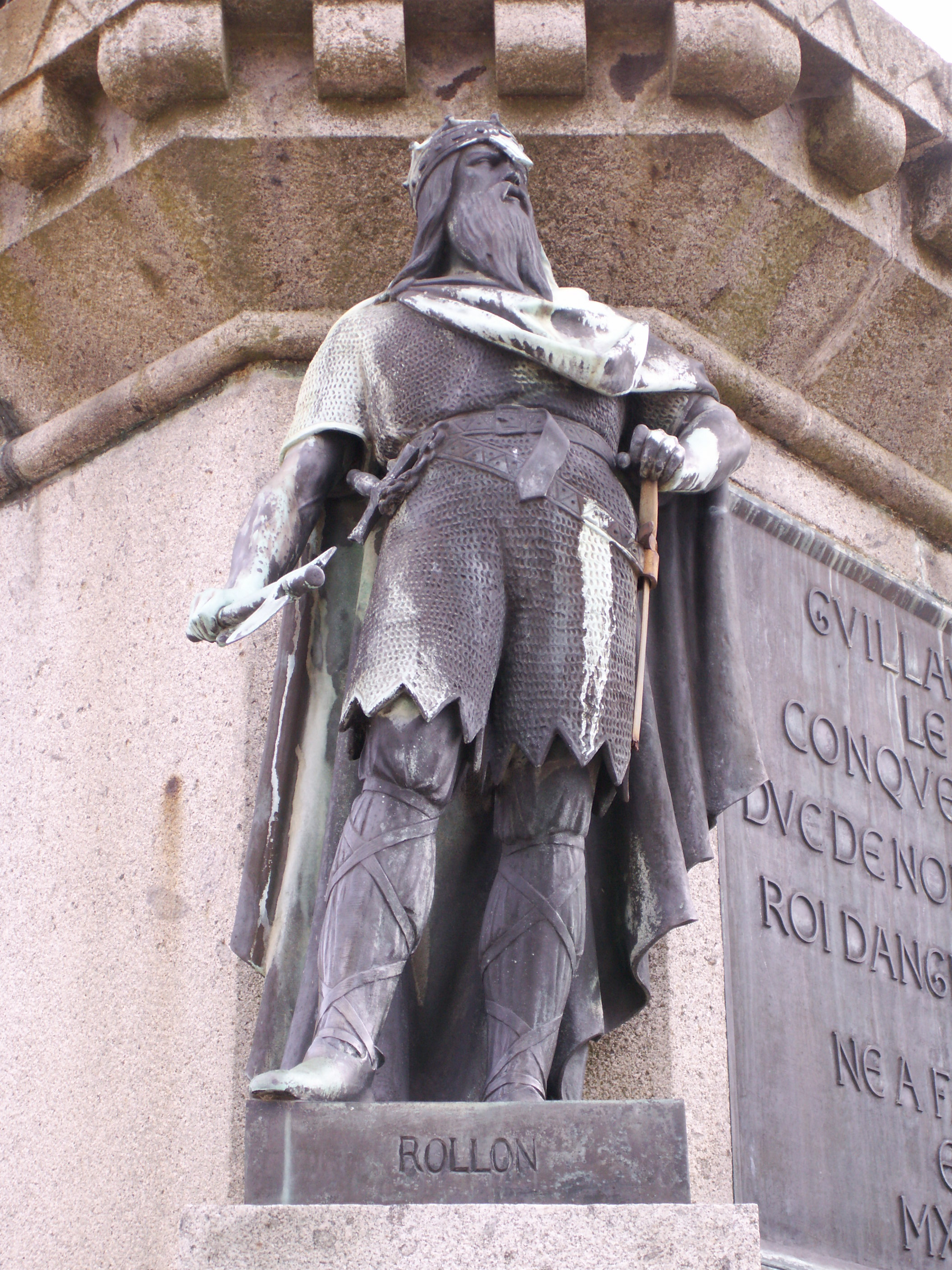
Statue of Rollo, founder of the fiefdom of Normandy, standing in Falaise, Calvados, birthplace of his descendant William the Conqueror, the Duke of Normandy who became King of England

In June 911 Vikings under a chief named Rollo unsuccessfully laid siege to Chartres and in July the Franks successfully relieved Chartres. resulting in a close Viking defeat. Though weakened, the Vikings were still a formidable force, and in the aftermath Charles the Simple who was with the army decided to negotiate the Treaty of Saint-Clair-sur-Epte with Rollo. Rollo was ceded lands along the lower Seine already under Danish control with Rollo agreeing to defend the territory from other Vikings and that he and his men would convert to Christianity.

The descendants of Rollo and his followers created a long-lived Viking dynasty and an aristocracy that step by step adopted the local French related language, intermarried with the area's native inhabitants and became militant Christians.

In 924, King Rudolph extended Rollo's county westward up to the river Vire, including the Bessin, where some Danes from England had settled not long before. Rollo's son and successor, William Longsword, supported Rudolph and in 933 in return was granted Avranchin and the heavily Norse Cotentin which were in practice outside effective Carolingian control and so had to be forcibly taken from the Duchy of Brittany and would quite quickly suffer a pagan revolt. These expansions brought the boundaries of Normandy roughly in line with those of the ecclesiastical province of Rouen.

Longsword came into conflict with Arnulf of Flanders, who had him assassinated in 942. This led to a crisis in Normandy, with a minor succeeding as Richard I, and also led to a temporary revival of Norse paganism. Richard I's son, Richard II, was the first to be styled duke of Normandy, the ducal title becoming established between 987 and 1006.

In 980, the dukes helped place Hugh Capet on the French throne. In 1066, Duke William defeated Harold II of England at the Battle of Hastings and was subsequently crowned King of England, through the Norman conquest of England. Anglo-Norman and French relations became complicated after the Norman Conquest. The Norman dukes retained control of their holdings in Normandy as vassals owing fealty to the King of France, but they were his equals as kings of England. Serfdom was outlawed around 1100.

From 1154 until 1214, with the creation of the Angevin Empire, the Angevin kings of England controlled half of France and all of England, dwarfing the power of the French king, yet the Angevins were still de jure French vassals.

The Duchy remained part of the Angevin Empire until 1204, when Philip II of France conquered the continental lands of the Duchy, which became part of the royal domain. The English sovereigns continued to claim them until the Treaty of Paris (1259) but in fact kept only the Channel Islands. Having little confidence in the loyalty of the Normans, Philip installed French administrators and built a powerful fortress, the Château de Rouen, as a symbol of royal power.

==== Cultural identity ====
There were two distinct patterns of Scandinavian settlement in the duchy. In the Danish area in the Roumois and the Caux, settlers intermingled with the indigenous Gallo-Romance-speaking population. Rollo shared out the large estates with his companions and gave agricultural land to his other followers. Danish settlers cleared their own land to farm it, and there was no segregation of populations. In the northern Cotentin the population was Norwegian and resisted Christianisation, including a pagan rebellion against Longsword's rule and Scandinavian derived place names indicate a constant use of Old Norse for four or five generations.

Within a few generations of the founding of Normandy in 911, however, the Scandinavian settlers had intermarried with the natives and adopted much of their culture. But in 911, Normandy was not a political nor monetary unit. Frankish culture remained dominant and according to some scholars, 10th century Normandy was characterized by a diverse Scandinavian population interacting with the "local Frankish matrix" that existed in the region. In the end, the Normans stressed assimilation with the local population. In the 11th century, the anonymous author of the Miracles of Saint Wulfram referred to the formation of a Norman identity as "shaping [of] all races into one single people".

According to some historians, the idea of "Norman" as a political identity was a deliberate creation of the court of Richard I in the 960s as a way to "create a powerful if rather incoherent sense of group solidarity to galvanize the duchy's disparate elites around the duke".

==== Social history ====
The first generations of Scandinavian and Anglo-Scandinavian settlers brought slaves, mainly from the British Isles, and often turned the women into frilla, a Scandinavian tradition which became known as more Danico, medieval Latin meaning "Danish marriage". The first counts of Rouen and the dukes of Normandy had concubines too. Illegitimacy was not a bar to succession and three of the first six rulers of Normandy were illegitimate sons of concubines.

==== Political systems ====
The Norman polity had to contend with the Frankish and Breton systems of power that already existed in Normandy. In the early 10th century, Normandy was not a political or monetary unit. According to many academics, "the formation of a new aristocracy, monastic reform, episcopal revival, written bureaucracy, saints’ cults – with necessarily different timelines" were as important if not more than the ducal narrative espoused by Dudo. The formation of the Norman state also coincided with the creation of an origin myth for the Norman ducal family through Dudo, such as Rollo being compared to a "good pagan" like the Trojan hero Aeneas. Through this narrative, the Normans were assimilated closer to the Frankish core as they moved away from their pagan Scandinavian origins.

The Norman dukes created the most powerful, consolidated duchy in Western Europe between the years 980 and 1050. By the 1020s the dukes were able to impose vassalage on the lay nobility as they had already on holders of church lands. Until Richard II, the Norman rulers did not hesitate to call Viking mercenaries for help to get rid of their enemies around Normandy, such as the king of the Franks himself. Olaf Haraldsson crossed the Channel in such circumstances to support Richard II in the conflict against the count of Chartres and was baptized in Rouen in 1014.

The dukes maintained relations with foreign monarchs, especially the king of England: Emma, sister of Richard II married King Ethelred II of England. They appointed family members to positions as counts and viscounts, which came about around the year 1000. They held on to some territory in Scandinavia and the right to enter those lands by sea. The Norman dukes also ensured that their vassal lords did not get too powerful, lest they become a threat to the ducal authority. The Norman dukes thus had more authority over their own domains than other territorial princes in northern France. Their wealth thus enabled them to give large tracts of land to the abbeys and to ensure the loyalty of their vassals with gifts of fiefdoms. William's conquest of England opened up more land to the dukes, allowing them to continue these practices whilst preserving sufficient land holdings to serve as their powerbase.

The course of the 11th century did not have any strict organizations and was somewhat chaotic. The great lords made oaths of fidelity to the heir of the duchy, and were in return granted public and ecclesiastical authority. The justice system lacked a central governing body and written laws were uncommon.

The aristocracy was composed of a small group of Scandinavian men, while the majority of the Norman political leaders were of Frankish descent. At the start of the 11th century, the region was attacked by the Bretons from the West, the Germans from the East, and the people of Anjou from the South. All of the aristocrats' fidelity oaths to the Norman dukes were attributed to defending their important domains. As early as 1040, the term 'baron' indicated the elite knights and soldiers of the duke. On the other hand, the term 'vassal' does not appear in the documents from 1057 onwards. It was also in the middle of the 11th century that fiefdoms came to exist. Richard the First designated fiefdoms to counts from the dynasty and the cities so as to prevent them from getting too powerful.

=== French appanage ===
Although within the royal demesne, Normandy retained some specificity as a separate province. Norman law continued to serve as the basis for court decisions. In 1315, faced with the constant encroachments of royal power on the liberties of Normandy, the barons and towns pressed the Norman Charter on the king. This document did not provide autonomy to the province but protected it against arbitrary royal taxes and confirmed that Parisian courts could not overrule the Exchequer of Normandy However when the monarchy became stronger it wrested most of the power back.

The Duchy of Normandy survived mainly by the intermittent installation of a duke. In practice, the King of France sometimes gave that portion of his kingdom to a close member of his family, who then did homage to the king. Philip VI made Jean, his eldest son and heir to his throne, the Duke of Normandy. In turn, Jean II appointed his heir, Charles. In 1465, Louis XI was forced by the League of the Public Weal to cede the duchy to his eighteen-year-old brother, Charles de Valois and Normandy served as a base for rebellion. Dauphin Louis Charles, the second son of Louis XVI, was again given the nominal title of 'Duke of Normandy' before the death of his elder brother in 1789.

==== Channel Islands ====
After the absorption of the mainland portion of the Duchy into the royal domain of France, the Duchy, now confined to the Channel Islands, continued to exist under the English Crown until it was split around 1290 into the Bailiwicks of Guernsey and Jersey by Otto de Grandson, who was Lord of the Channel Islands since his appointment in 1277 by Edward I of England.

The Bishop of Coutances still exercised ecclesiastical jurisdiction over the Channel Islands, particularly in Alderney where the Bishop also held partial authority over the Leader of Alderney, until the English Reformation. The final rupture occurred in 1569 when Queen Elizabeth I demanded that the bishop hand the island over to the Bishop of Winchester.

== Historiography ==
Historians have few sources of information for this period of Norman history: Dudo of Saint-Quentin, William of Jumièges, Orderic Vitalis, Flodoard of Reims, Richerus and Wace. Diplomatic messages are the primary source of information for the succession of dukes.

The earliest extended narrative of the Norman foundation is the "Historia Normannorum" of Dudo of Saint-Quentin, composed around 1015–1030 for Duke Richard I and Richard II. Dudo presents Rollo as a pious founder and constructs a genealogy linking the dukes with both Frankish royalty and heroic Scandinavian origins. Though literary and partisan, Dudo's account shaped later chronicles such as those of William of Jumièges and Orderic Vitalis, and influenced medieval and modern views of the Norman beginnings.

== Religion ==
In the early eleventh century, the dukes began a programme of church reform, encouraging the Cluniac reform of monasteries with the Dukes building monasteries and supporting monastic schools, thus helping to integrate distant territories into the Duchy.. Prominent churchmen were imported into Normandy from other parts of Europe. The revival extended beyond monasteries to the episcopate, with reform-minded bishops rebuilding cathedral chapters and strengthening diocesan administration. Although bishops were more likely to be senior aristocrats such as Odo of Bayeux or members of the ducal family like Odo of Bayeux, this also strengthened to the position of the church.

Viking raids greatly disrupted the church with bishops being killed and churches targeted for their wealth,, meaning that the archdiocese of Rouen collapsed. Monasteries were particular targets due to their wealth and the relative lack of defence. Great abbeys such as Jumièges, Fontenelle and Graville Abbey were destroyed and it is probable that no monastic community was left within Normandy with the exception of Mont-Saint-Michel with the monks fleeing from the persistent raids to different parts of Europe.

Despite Rollo's conversion there is credible evidence that this was insincere and that the first generation of settlers were still largely pagan. When the next generation of Normans were Christianised and the dioceses being re-established and the monasteries invited back, although progress was slow with only four monasteries refounded by the year 1000 and the bishop of Coutances being exiled to Rouen until at least 1025. Saint-Wandrille and Mont-Saint-Michel were some of the earlier monasteries to be refounded with influences from Flemish monastic reformers. The main source of Cluny's influence was Fécamp Abbey under the Italian William of Volpiano which became the model for other Norman monasteries including Jumièges, Bec, Saint-Ouen, and Saint-Evroul.

The dukes started to impose heavy feudal burdens on the ecclesiastical fiefs, which supplied the armed knights that enabled the dukes to control the restive lay lords but whose bastards could not inherit. By the mid-11th century the Duke of Normandy could count on more than 300 armed and mounted knights from his ecclesiastical vassals alone.

The dukes had a large degree of control over the church in their Duchy, which grew after 1066 when the Dukes gained royal power with an Ecclesiastical council in Lillebonne confirmed in 1080 that the Duke had ultimate authority over the Norman church.

An important part of this church reform programme was patronising intellectual pursuits, especially the proliferation of scriptoria and the reconstitution of a compilation of lost illuminated manuscripts. The church was utilised by the dukes as a unifying force for their disparate duchy. These centres were in contact with the so-called "Winchester school", which channeled a pure Carolingian artistic tradition to Normandy. In the final decade of the 11th and first of the 12th century, Normandy experienced a golden age of illustrated manuscripts, but it was brief and the major scriptoria of Normandy ceased to function after the midpoint of the century.

The Norman Conquest exported much of this revival to England, which had been going through its own programme of monastic reform. At first the imported Continental church leaders denigrated the pre-Conquest state of the Anglo-Saxon church with the new Archbishop of Canterbury Lanfranc showing no interest in Anglo-Saxon saints. However, Anglo-Norman monks later reviving the veneration for these saints. Monasteric land and privileges were once again defended by appealing to pre-Conquest charters.

In the next generation the two leading historians, Eadmer and William of Malmesbury, saw a pattern of early Saxon peaks followed by a decline which reached its nadir on the eve of the Conquest with the importation of . This scheme, which saw both the tenth century and the post-Conquest as peaks of monastic excellence preceded by periods of decline, satisfied both Norman propaganda and Anglo-Saxon pride, but in Gransden's view it unfairly denigrates the achievements of the periods of so-called decline.

== Law ==
There are traces of Scandinavian law in the customary laws of Normandy, which were first written down in the 13th century. A charter of 1050, listing several pleas before Duke William II, refers to the penalty of banishment as ullac (from Old Norse útlagr). The word was still current in the 12th century, when it was used in the Roman de Rou. Marriage more danico ("in the Danish manner"), that is, without any ecclesiastical ceremony in accordance with old Norse custom, was recognised as legal in Normandy and in the Norman church. The first three dukes of Normandy all practised it.

Scandinavian influence is especially apparent in laws relating to waters. The duke possessed the droit de varech (from Old Danish vrek), the right to all shipwrecks. He also had a monopoly on whale and sturgeon. A similar monopoly belonged to the Danish king in the Jutlandic law of 1241. Remarkably, whale (including dolphins) and sturgeon still belong to the monarch in the United Kingdom in the twenty-first century, as royal fish. The Norman Latin terms for whalers (valmanni, from hvalmenn) and whaling station (valseta, from hvalmannasetr) both derive from Old Norse. Likewise, fishing in Normandy seems to have come under Scandinavian rules. A charter of 1030 uses the term fisigardum (from Old Norse fiskigarðr) for "fisheries", a term also found in the Scanian law of c. 1210.

There is no surviving reference to the hirð or the leiðangr in Normandy, but the latter probably existed. The surname Huscaille, first attested in 1263, probably derives from húskarl, but is late evidence for the existence of a hirð in the 10th century.

== Modern usage ==
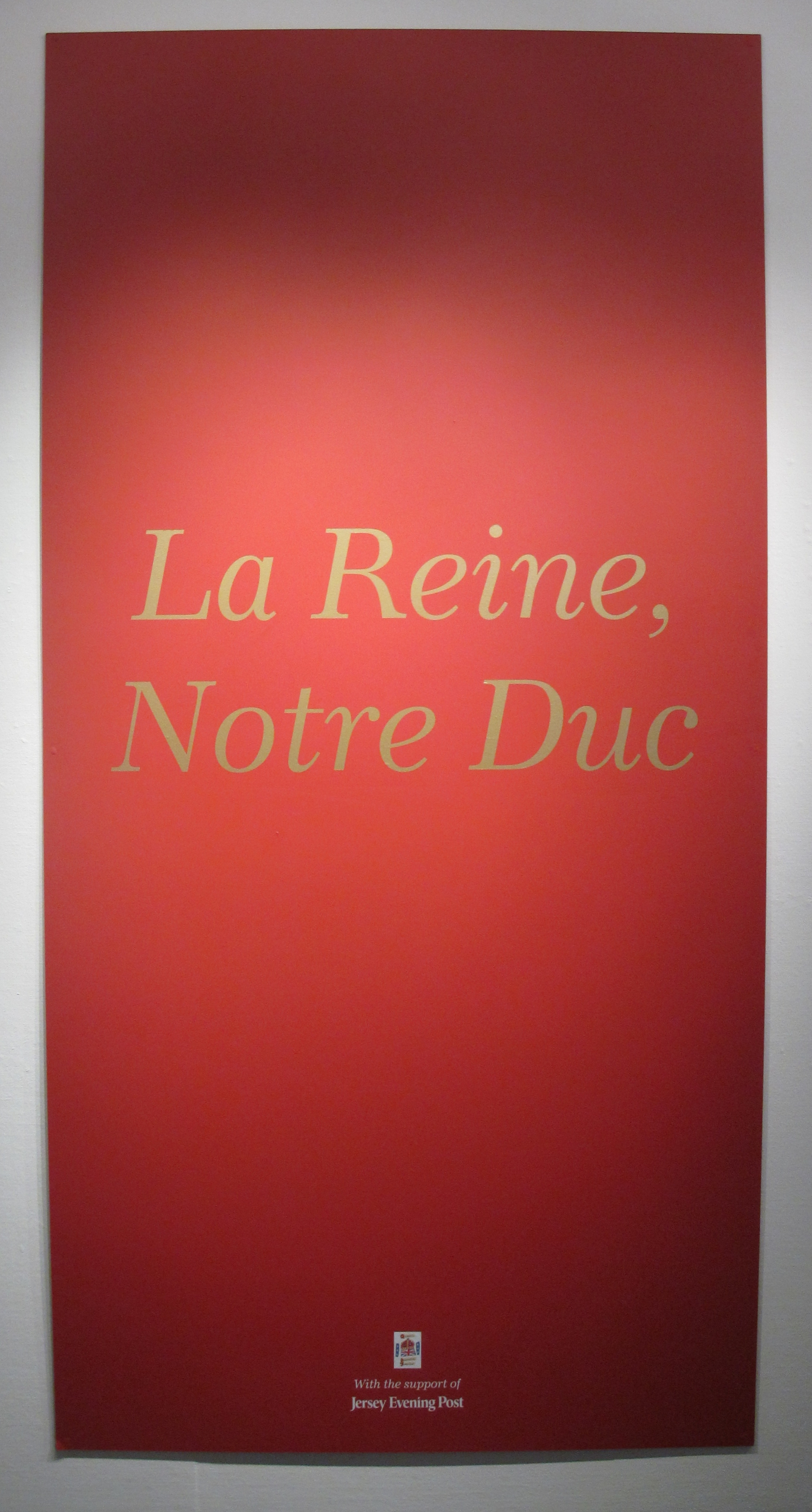
"La Reine, Notre Duc": title of a Diamond Jubilee exhibition at the Jersey Arts Centre

In the Channel Islands, the British monarch is known informally as the "Duke of Normandy", irrespective of whether or not the holder is male (as in the case of Queen Elizabeth II who was known by this title). The Channel Islands are the last remaining part of the former Duchy of Normandy to remain under the rule of the British monarch. Although the English monarchy relinquished claims to continental Normandy and other French claims in 1259 (in the Treaty of Paris), the Channel Islands (except for Chausey under French sovereignty) remain Crown dependencies of the British throne.

In the islanders' loyal toast, they say, "The Duke of Normandy, our King", or "The King, our Duke", "L'Rouai, nouotre Duc" or "L'Roué, note Du" in Norman (Jèrriais and Guernésiais respectively), or "Le Roi, notre Duc" in Standard French, rather than simply "The King", as is the practice in the United Kingdom.

Queen Elizabeth II is often referred to by her traditional and conventional title of Duke of Normandy. However ... she is not the Duke in a constitutional capacity and instead governs in her right as Queen ... This notwithstanding, it is a matter of local pride for monarchists to treat the situation otherwise: the Loyal Toast at formal dinners is to "The Queen, our Duke" rather than "Her Majesty, the Queen" as in the UK.

The title 'Duke of Normandy' is not used in formal government publications, and, as a matter of Channel Islands law, does not exist.

The British historian Ben Pimlott noted that while Queen Elizabeth II was on a visit to mainland Normandy in May 1967, French locals began to doff their hats and shout "Vive la Duchesse!", to which the Queen supposedly replied "Well, I am the Duke of Normandy!"

== See also ==
- Norman architecture
- Norman England

== Sources ==
- Cantor, Norman F. (1993) [1963]. The Civilization of the Middle Ages: A Completely Revised and Expanded Edition of Medieval History. New York: HarperCollins. ISBN 9780060170332.
- Douglas, D. C. (1942). "Rollo of Normandy". The English Historical Review (57(228)): 417–436.
- Douglas, David C. (May 1964). William the Conqueror: The Norman Impact Upon England.
- Gransden, Antonia (1992). Legends, Traditions and History in Medieval England. London, UK: The Hambledon Press. ISBN 1-85285-016-7.
- Goyou, George's (1913). "Normandy" . In Herbermann, Charles (ed.). Catholic Encyclopedia. New York: Robert Appleton Company.
- Hjardar, Kim (2016). "The Frankish Empire and France". Vikings at War (1st ed.). Havertown, PA: Casemate Publishers. pp. 296–335. ISBN 9781612004549.
- Morris, Marc (2012). The Norman Conquest: The Battle of Hastings and the Fall of Anglo-Saxon England'. ISBN 978-1-4481-3602-5.
- Neveux, François (2008). A Brief History of the Normans. Constable & Robinson. ISBN 9780762433711.
- Potts, Cassandra (1997). Monastic Revival and Regional Identity in Early Normandy. Suffolk, UK & Rochester, NY: Boydell & Brewer. pp. 70–71. ISBN 9780851157023.
- Potts, Cassandra (2007). "Normandy 911-1114". In Harper-Bill, Christopher; Van Houts, Elisabeth (eds.). A Companion to the Anglo-Norman World. Woodbridge, UK: The Boydell Press.
- Riché, Pierre (1993). The Carolingians; A Family who Forged Europe. Translated by Allen, Michael Idomir. Philadelphia: University of Pennsylvania Press.
