= Robert of France =

Robert of France may refer to:

- Robert I of France (866–923), King of Western Francia
- Robert II of France (972–1031), King of France
