= Treaty of Saint-Clair-sur-Epte =

911 treaty establishing the Duchy of Normandy

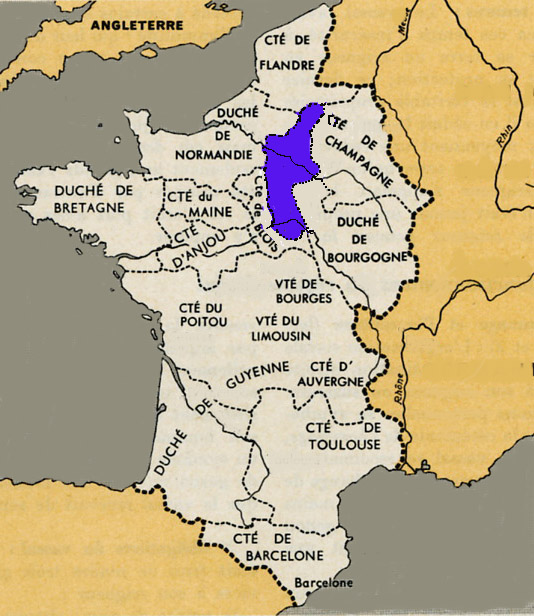
Kingdom of France in the late 10th century; the Duchy of Normandy is marked Duché de Normandie, and the royal domain is blue.

The treaty of Saint-Clair-sur-Epte (911) is the foundational treaty of the Duchy of Normandy, establishing Rollo, a Norse warlord and Viking leader, as the first Duke of Normandy in exchange for his loyalty to Charles III, the king of West Francia, following the Siege of Chartres. This treaty included a land grant of farmable coastal land from Charles to Rollo in return for Rollo's fealty and help against other Viking groups that had been regularly raiding the northern coastline. This treaty effectively changed how mainland Europe resolved ongoing raids from the Vikings.

== Background ==
=== Carolingian Ascension ===
Vikings had been raiding and plundering French lands since the age of Charlemagne, and afterwards many Carolingian kings unsuccessfully tried to stop Viking incursions. Upon Louis the Pious death, his son Charles II the Bald took over. Charles II had immediately been thrust into a war against his brother Lothair. Lothair, who was the emperor at the time, ordered his Danish vassal to raid and plunder Charles’ kingdom. Eventually, the Vikings became accustomed to easily obtained riches and could not be controlled resulting in them plundering whatever they wanted to, at any time they want. It had reached a certain extent, where the Vikings had more control over where they would plunder next, compared to the Danish king. They hit modern day Normandy and Brittany in devastating fashion. The most important raid that occurred during his reign was when the famous Viking Ragnar attacked Paris. Charles tried to stop this plundering by force but, like his family before him, was not successful. He then opted for an approach to pay the Vikings off, but this only encouraged the Vikings to plunder more.

After Charles II the Bald died in 877, there were 6 more rulers that had to deal with the Vikings up to the Treaty of Saint Claire sur Epte, with the last being Charles the Simple. The five rulers before him; Louis the Stammerer, Louis III, Carloman II, Odo of Paris, and Charles the Fat, had not done anything more significant than their predecessors to thwart these Vikings. Throughout the times of these six kings, the counts and dukes under the kingdom in West Frankia started to fortify their own lands heavily to counter these Viking attacks. Eventually, the Vikings raids would become much harder to accomplish as these smaller feudal lords protected their land well. Nonetheless, it has still been hundreds of years of Viking invasion and permanent settlements were bound to happen.

=== From Sieging to Settling ===
Starting from primitive tribes that formed small bands for hunting and food gathering. The Vikings evolved over time into a large group of roving bandits that sailed the coast of Europe and at the expense of the society in which they faced, gained substantial rewards from the act of plundering. While sailing through Frankish territory, it reached many notable cities during the height of their large-scale pillaging including Paris in 845 and 885. The outcome of Viking invasion ended in the often case of bribery on behalf of the Franks with valuables such as silver. Over time, demand for the loot gained from the plunders increased among the Viking tribes and this caused many to settle to ward off other Vikings as well as increase profits. On top of this, there was concern for overpopulation, political persecution, and conquest incentives that drove up the number of Viking migrants out of their native land.

In the case of Rollo, according to Dudo of Saint-Quentin, Rollo and his brother Gurim fought a prolonged rebellion against the King of Denmark and agreed to a peace meeting that ended in a royal ambush in which Gurim and many of Rollo's followers were killed. Following the defeat, Rollo gathered his surviving men and escaped to Scania with six ships. He was one of the leaders of the Viking Siege of Paris in 885 and 886.

He later brought thousands of Vikings to raid, plunder, and settle had enacted a permanent settlement along the Seine River centered on Rouen in the year 900. Just two years before this in 898, a new king had been crowned called Charles the Simple. Although a bit worrisome, the permanent Viking settlement was relatively peaceful and did not pose a real threat to Charles.

=== Battle of Chartres ===
It was until 911 when raiding resumed from Rollo that caused the real concern of the Viking threat again, but this time things were different. In June 911 Rollo unsuccessfully laid siege to Chartres. On 20 July the Franks under Robert the Count of Paris, who would later be Robert I of France, relieved Chartres resulting in a close Viking defeat.

Though weakened, the Vikings were still able to properly defend and attack, and in the aftermath Charles the Simple who was with the army decided to negotiate a peace treaty with Rollo.

== The Treaty ==
Rollo was originally offered Flanders, but refused, demanding land more suitable for farming. Charles then offered him the land west of the river Epte, and while the exact extent of the original grant is debated the consensus is that it was broadly Rouen and the area of present-day Upper Normandy which his followers had been occupying since 900, possibly the pagi of the Caux, Évrecin, Roumois and Talou - formerly known as the county of Rouen. In return for formal recognition of the lands he possessed, Rollo agreed to be baptised and pledged vassalage, vowing to guard the estuaries of the Seine from further Viking attacks. As was custom, Rollo took the baptismal name “Robert”, after his godfather, Robert the Count of Paris.

Some authors argue that Rollo owed no service or oath to the king for his lands, nor that there were any legal means for the king to take them back: they were granted outright. Likewise, Rollo may not have been created a count or given comital authority, but later sagas refer to him as Rúðujarl (earl of Rouen).

The treaty was probably verbal with the terms only known through the historian Dudo of Saint-Quentin, who was writing a century after the event. The exact date of the treaty is unknown, but it was likely in the autumn of 911. A royal diploma of 918 confirms the donation of 911, using the verb adnuo ("I grant").

One of the most memorable, if likely exaggerated, accounts of the meeting was recorded by Dudo of Saint-Quentin, although not corroborated by other primary sources . Rollo was asked by the attendant bishops to bend down to kiss Charles’s foot as an act of submission, but Rollo refused and instead commanded one of his warriors do the task who by raising the king's foot to his mouth as Charles was standing toppled him to the amusement of their entourage. Author Alice Taylor argues Dudo instead exaggerated respectful gestures he described Rollo enacting towards Charles the Simple to create an image of submission.

The seal of the agreement was to be a marriage between Rollo and Gisela, daughter of Charles, possibly her legitimate father. Since Charles first married in 907, that would mean that Gisela was at most 5 years old at the time of the treaty of 911 which offered her in marriage. It has therefore been speculated that she could have been an illegitimate daughter. However, a diplomatic child betrothal need not be doubted.

Charles the Simple benefited from having an alliance with Rollo, a successful warlord. He gave this land under the assumption that Rollo would be baptized and fend off other Vikings who had been raiding the northern coastline of West Francia, allowing Charles to focus on the conflict that he was facing with his nobles. While Charles was able to keep peace with the nobles for a while, he was eventually deposed in 923. The author Letty ten Clair argues that the treaty may have been a temporary Carolingian tactic to ease Viking attacks.

== Formation of Normandy ==
On taking his oath of fealty, Rollo divided the lands between the rivers Epte and Risle among his chieftains and settled in the de facto capital of Rouen. Their descendants created an aristocracy that step by step adopted the local Gallo-Romance language, intermarried with the area's native Gallo-Frankish inhabitants, and adopted Christianity.

Nevertheless, the first generations of Scandinavian and Anglo-Scandinavian settlers brought slaves, mainly from the British Isles, and often turned the women into frilla, a Scandinavian tradition which became known as more Danico, medieval Latin meaning "Danish marriage". The first counts of Rouen and the dukes of Normandy had concubines too. While very little archeological excavations about the Vikings were done in Normandy, the Norman toponymy retains a large Scandinavian and Anglo-Scandinavian heritage, due to a constant use of Old Norse during four or five generations in certain parts of Normandy.

With Norse bands of settlers, composed of non-aristocratic lineages, there came multiple communities formed and a new political ethos that was not Frankish. The Norsemen ("Northmen") came to be known as Normans in French. This identity formation was partly possible because the Norse were adapting indigenous culture, speaking French, renouncing paganism and converting to Christianity, and intermarrying with the local population.

The title of Duchy of Normandy was a role without precedent. The Scandinavian Rollo was an outsider among the Franks and his actions needed to be strategic to maintain the political power of this new position. By choosing to assimilate and reinvent their cultural identity the Vikings and Rollo’s descendants created a greater succession than when events like this treaty had occurred before. Vikings were defined by their "heathenism" and their Paganism to distinguish them between the Natives and the invading Vikings. The Treaty of Saint-Clair-Sur-Epte granted the duchy to Rollo if he was baptized as a Christian abandoning his previous religion. Rollo understood that Franks would have animosity towards him, especially for his religion. Ademar of Chabannes wrote of Rollo as simultaneously beheading his captives in the name of his Pagan gods and donating to the established Christian churches in the name of God. Rollo’s descendants did understand the importance of cultural assimilation by phasing out Pagan practices in favor of Christian ones, such as Rollo’s grandson William restoring Frankish monasteries.

The treaty allowed these new settlements, but not all Vikings were welcome. With the death of Alan I, King of Brittany, another group of Vikings occupying Brittany faced their own dispute. Around 937, Alan I's grandson Alan II returned from England to expel those Vikings from Brittany in a war that concluded in 939. During this period the Cotentin Peninsula was lost by Brittany and gained by Normandy.

Over subsequent decades, Rollo's successors expanded this domain westward to include the Cotentin and eastward into the Pays de Caux, laying the foundations of the Duchy of Normandy.

There would be a convergence between Franks and Normans within a few generations. Political marriages played an important role in cultivating alliances and cohesion. While the Normans did adapt, adopt, and assimilate to Christianity, they did not necessarily adopt indigenous administration. Rather, the Normans "adhered longer than the Franks around them – to older forms of social organization" that the Franks were abandoning. Ultimately the Treaty was long lasting as descendants continued to assimilate and the idea of submission to Carolingian ideals was already in place. The cultural integration and assimilation by the Scandinavians allowed Normandy to create its own cultural identity that ultimately marks the Treaty of Saint-Clair-Sur-Epte as the influential moment that started the evolution of Normandy’s power. With a strong national identity Normandy went on to conquer other nations within generations of Rollo’s first Ducal ruling.

Rollo's descendant William became king of England in 1066 after defeating Harold Godwinson, the last of the Anglo-Saxon kings, at the Battle of Hastings, while retaining the fiefdom of Normandy for himself and his descendants.

== From Medieval to Modern ==
One reputable source on the Treaty of Saint Clair sur Epte is the Gesta Normannorum written by Dudo of Saint Quentin. His work was compiled of flowery poetry and stories glorifying the greatness of the Normans. Dudo’s accounts are rarely trusted as law but are imperative to understanding the cultural significance of this treaty between Rollo and Charles the Simple. Hired to write a narrative history for the Norman Dukedom, Dudo’s history helps modern historians understand the role of social relations and culture, giving key insights that modern historians have gone on to debate throughout history. These issues include, but cannot be limited to, the role of religion, military power, political power, and cultural values within Normandy, as well as West Frankia, and Europe as a whole.

== See also ==
- List of treaties
- Saint-Clair-sur-Epte

== Sources ==
- Bates, David (1982). Normandy Before 1066. London: Longman. ISBN 0-582-48492-8.
- Dudo (1998). Eric Christiansen (ed.). History of the Normans. Translated by Eric Christiansen. Woodbridge, Suffolk: Boydell Press. ISBN 978-0851155524.
- Ferguson, Robert (2009). The Hammer and the Cross: A New History of the Vikings. London: Allen Lane, an imprint of Penguin Group. ISBN 978-0-670-02079-9.
- Goyou, George's (1913). "Normandy" . In Herbermann, Charles (ed.). Catholic Encyclopedia. New York: Robert Appleton Company.
- Hjardar, Kim (2016). "The Frankish Empire and France". Vikings at War (1st ed.). Havertown, PA: Casemate Publishers. pp. 296–335. ISBN 9781612004549.
