= Port-Villez =

- Part of Notre-Dame-de-la-Mer
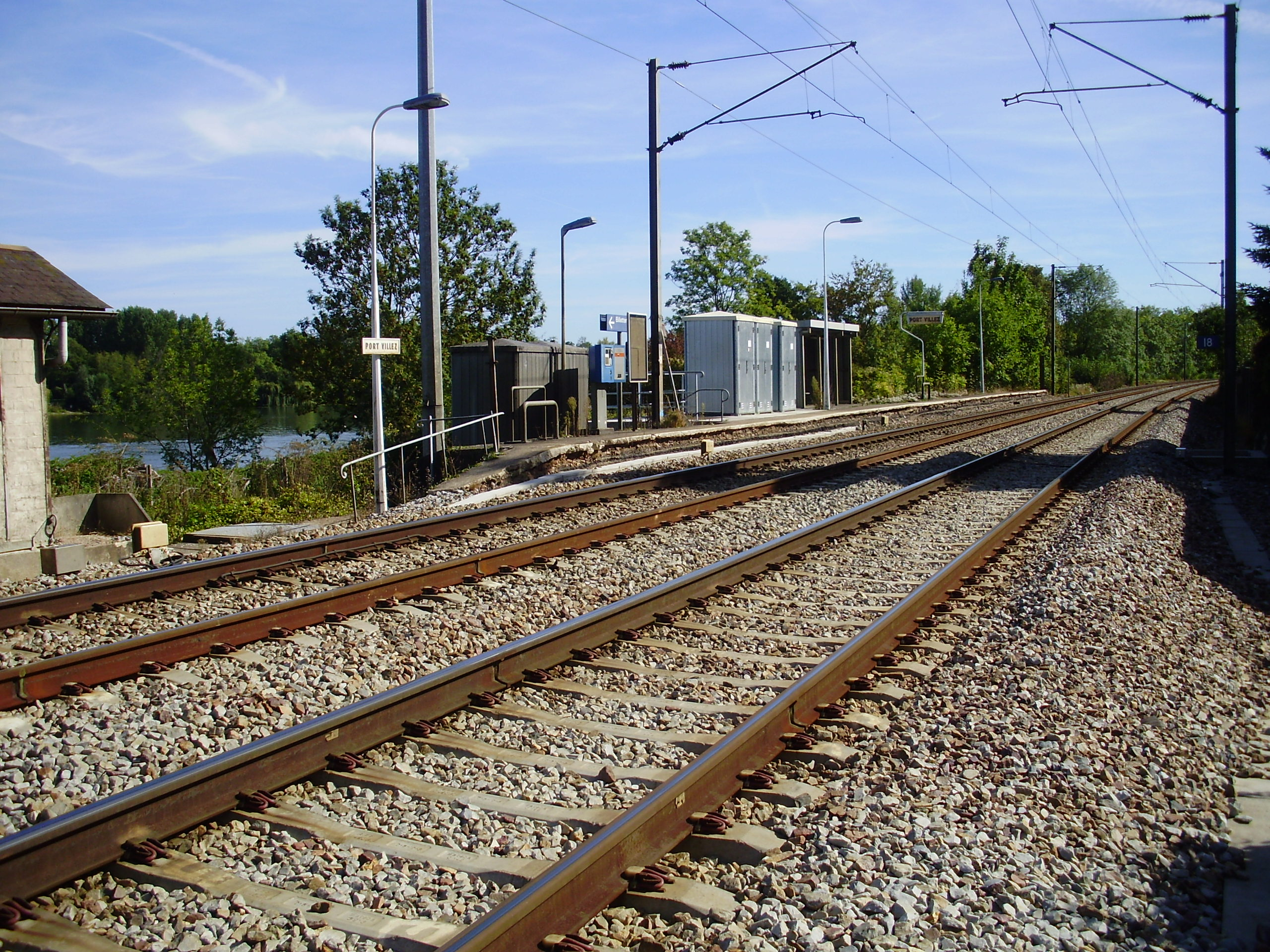
- Port-Villez railway station
- Location of Port-Villez
- Location within France Location within Île-de-France (region)
- Coordinates: 49°03′47″N 1°31′24″E
- Country: France
- Region: Île-de-France
- Department: Yvelines
- Arrondissement: Mantes-la-Jolie
- Canton: Bonnières-sur-Seine
- Commune: Notre-Dame-de-la-Mer
- Area^{1}: 5.35 km^{2} (2.07 sq mi)
- Elevation: 120 m (390 ft)
- Highest elevation: 143 m (469 ft)
- Lowest elevation: 10 m (33 ft)
- Population (2019): 269
  - Density: 50.3/km^{2} (130/sq mi)
- Time zone: UTC+01:00 (CET)
  - Summer (DST): UTC+02:00 (CEST)
- Postal code: 78270
- ^{1} French Land Register data, which excludes lakes, ponds, glaciers > 1 km^{2} (0.386 sq mi or 247 acres) and river estuaries.

Port-Villez is a former commune in the Yvelines department in the Île-de-France in north-central France. On 1 January 2019, it was merged into the new commune Notre-Dame-de-la-Mer.

== See also ==
- Communes of the Yvelines department

== Gallery ==
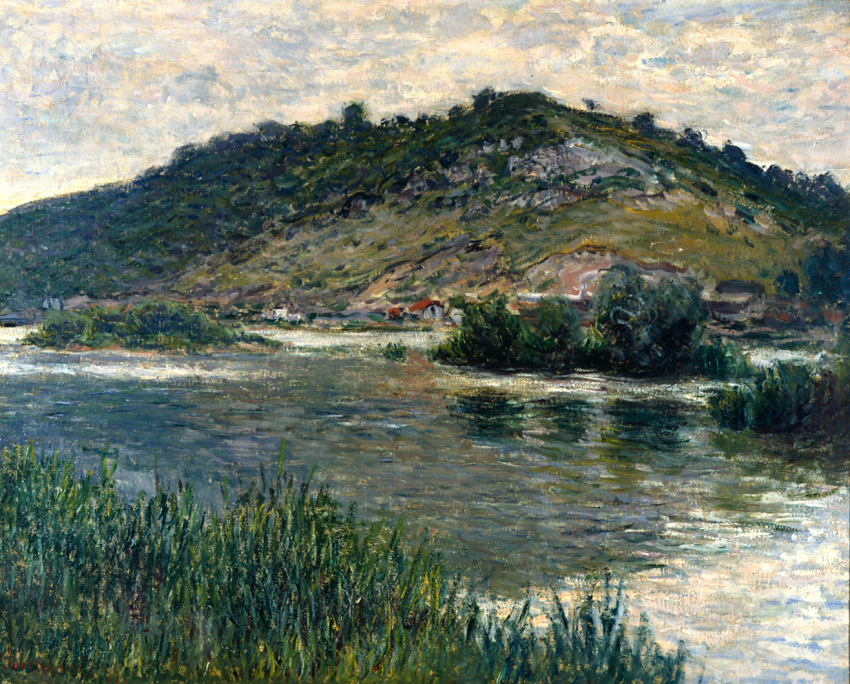
Claude Monet. Landscape on Port-Villez, Museo Soumaya, 1883.

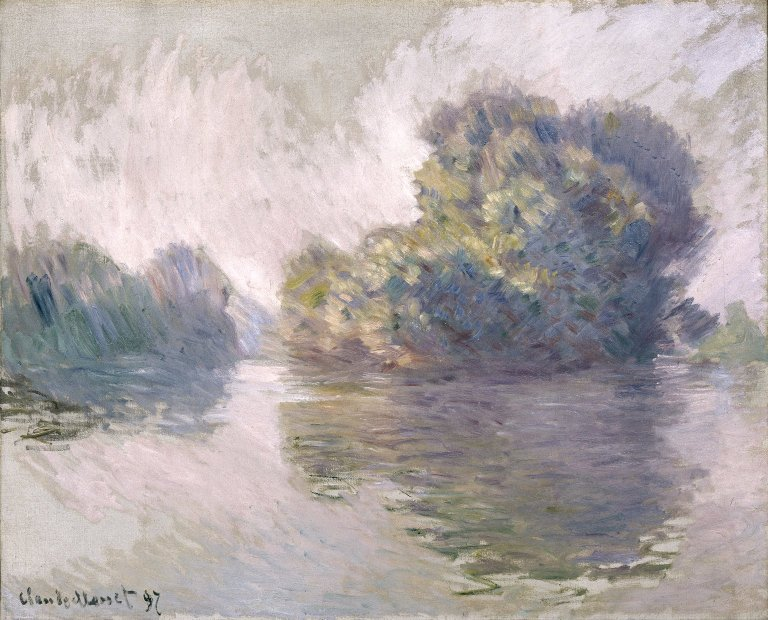
The Islets at Port-Villez (Les Iles à Port-Villez) by Claude Monet, Brooklyn Museum, 1897.
