= More danico =

Medieval non-church sanctioned spousal practice "in the Danish manner"

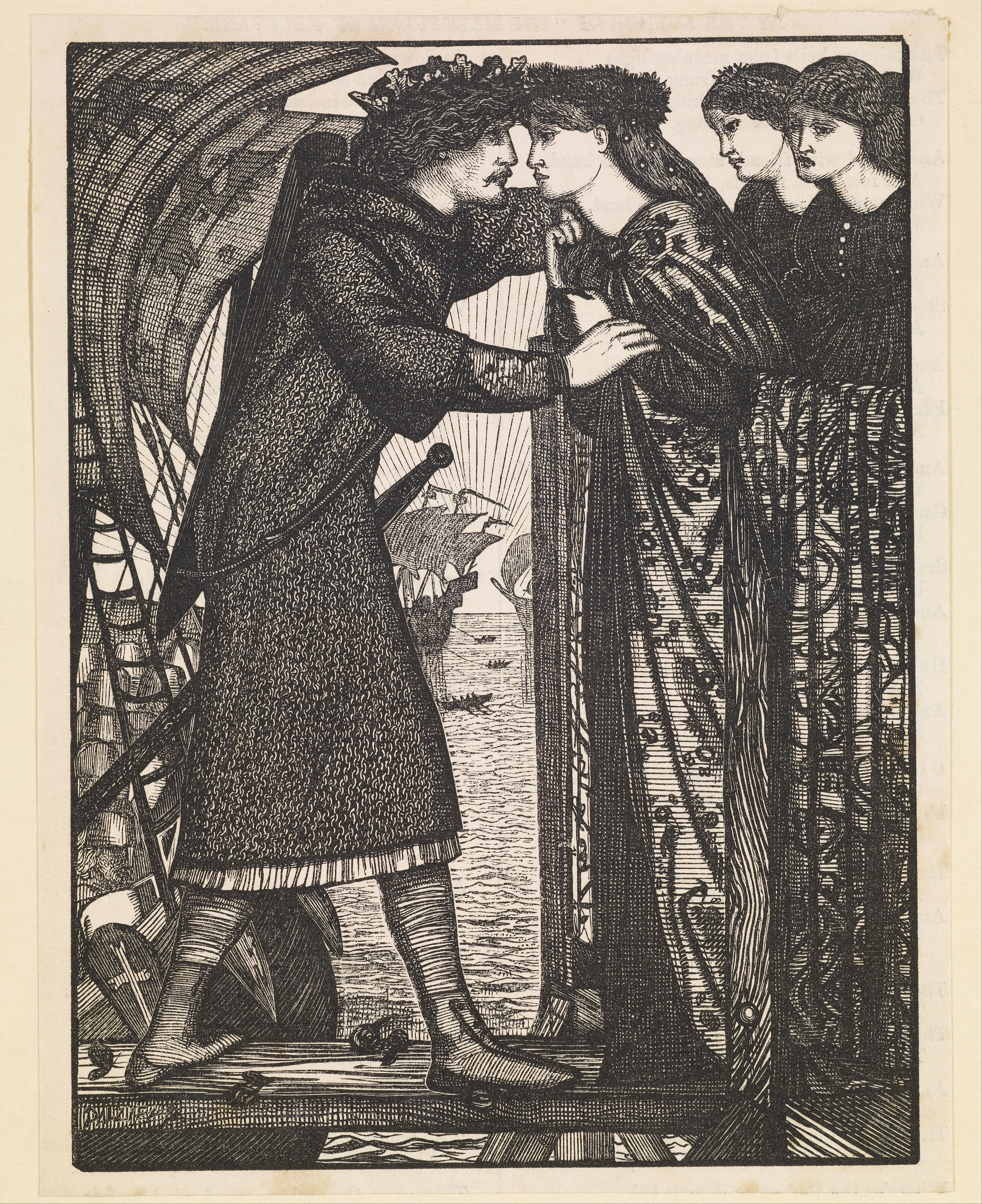
A Norse Saga (Google Art Project)

The phrase more danico is a Medieval Latin legal expression which may be translated as "according to Danish custom", i.e. under Medieval Scandinavian customary law. It designates a type of traditional marriage practiced in northern Europe during the Middle Ages.

== The institution ==
The examples that have come down to us involve powerful rulers in a union with a highborn woman of somewhat lesser rank. Rarely, it occurred to legitimize an abduction, as with Rollo and Poppa, who was taken after a battle at Bayeux; but this is not a defining characteristic. While Roman law had not distinguished between elopement and bride kidnapping (both being raptus in parentes), the distinction was significant in Germanic law. Still, according to Reynolds, the consent of the parentes was required in the more danico case. This consent could still be obtained after the fact, if an elopement was involved.

It is possible, therefore, that marriage more danico was neither informal marriage nor even legitimized abduction, but simply secular marriage contracted in accordance with Germanic law, rather than ecclesiastical marriage.

The word "secular" here should not be interpreted to mean that no context of Germanic religion was involved. Although the form of any ritual that might have been employed is unknown, it is sometimes assumed that it was a type of handfasting.

More danico permitted polygyny (serial or simultaneous), but is not synonymous with it. The "putting away" of a more danico wife could apparently be done at the mere wish of the husband; the rights of the wife are unclear. Often the putting away was done with the intention of marrying a still higher-ranking woman more christiano; but since there are numerous instances of the husband returning to the more danico wife, it is possible that the relationship had merely been deactivated or kept in the background. The union could also be fully dissolved, so that the wife was free to marry another man. Her consent in the matter may or may not have been required; again, the consensual aspect is unknown. (See below.)

By tradition and customary law, the children of such a relationship were in no way considered of lesser rank or disadvantaged with respect to inheritance. Many sons more danico went on to become dukes or kings by succession or conquest.

Increasingly discouraged by the Christian Church, the practice gradually died out.

== Status of Germanic marriages in a Christian society ==
In the middle and north of France, where there was less Roman law in the customary law, Roman law was not accepted in bulk or as authoritative in itself; but it influenced the customary law.

It was not until the nation consciousness of the western nations was well developed and national laws were codified that it became the norm that all persons in a country were to be subject to the same law. Previously, each man was held accountable according to the laws of his own people.

In France in the course of the ninth, tenth, and eleventh centuries the old Germanic principle of the personality of the law, that is, of law as applicable to persons according to their race, had given way to the principle of territoriality, that is, of law as valid within a certain country.

By accepting baptism and vassalage under a Christian prince under Charles the Simple after the Treaty of Saint-Clair-sur-Epte in 911, Rollo had placed the Vikings of Normandy on the inevitable path of Christianization; but they clung to some old customs.

There was a perennial political tension between canon law and the traditional law. The Church deprecated this type of traditional union, employing the terms "bastardy" and "concubinage". On a purely political level, temporal rulers of more fully Christianized entities did not ignore the advantage of denigrating their enemies in moral terms with respect to their marriage customs.

The instrumentality of Christian clergy at a marriage ceremony was not specifically required by the Church until the Council of Trent on November 11, 1563.

== Historical examples ==
The Roman ethnographer Tacitus writing in his De origine et situ Germanorum described the customs of the Germanic tribes and praised their monogamy. He did note that among the upper classes, however, polygyny was not unheard of. By the Viking Age, the Germanic peoples of Scandinavia had acquired a reputation for the habit.

Speaking of the Swedes, Adam von Bremen said:

For every man has two or three or more women at the same time, according to the extent of his power; the rich and the rulers have more than they can count.

Norman chronicler William of Jumieges uses the term explicitly to refer to two relationships:

- Rollo, founder of the Norman dynasty, had taken captive at Bayeux Poppa, daughter of a count, Berengar. Dudo of Saint-Quentin relates that they had been joined in marriage ("connubium"), William of Jumieges describing that Rollo had joined himself to her by more danico. She was mother of his son William Longsword. It is related that he put Poppa aside to marry Gisela, daughter of Charles the Simple, and that when Gisela died, he returned to Poppa. However, the absence of any record of this royal princess or her marriage in Frankish sources suggests the entire supposed marriage to Gisela may be apocryphal.
- William Longsword in his turn, had a son and heir by a woman whose name is given as Sprota. William of Jumieges reports that Longsword was bound to her pursuant to the mos danicus ("danico more iuncta"). The chronicler Flodoard refers to her simply as Longsword's 'Breton concubine' ("concubina britanna"). William would formally marry Luitgarde of Vermandois, daughter of Heribert II, count of Vermandois. [Dudo iii, 32 (p. 70)], who following William's death remarried to Thibaut, count of Blois. Sprota, who was mother of Longsword's heir, Richard I, Duke of Normandy, is said to have been forced to become concubine of Esperleng, the rich owner of several mills, by whom she became mother of Rodulf of Ivry, although it is unclear if this occurred during William's marriage to Luitgarde, or after his death.

Modern historians have applied the term to various irregular or polygynous unions formed by several other monarchs of the Viking age, including Harald Fairhair, Canute the Great, Harold Godwinson and Cerball mac Dúnlainge.

== The Latin phrase ==
Known to us from the histories of William of Jumièges and Orderic Vitalis, the purport of the phrase more danico is based in both the historical context, as well as in the meaning of the words within the fabric of the Latin language and the underlying Old Norse.

Orderic Vitalis spoke Old English until the age of ten, when he was forced to adopt Norman French; he wrote in a stilted, but fluent and educated Medieval Latin. In the vernacular he would have spoken of the custom as danesche manere (Norman French), as would William of Jumièges, who was Norman, but also wrote in Latin.

=== More ===
Mōre "by custom" is the ablative case of the Latin word for "manner", the subject form being mōs (cf. More judaico, "according to Jewish custom"). In Lewis and Short's Latin Dictionary, the semantic range of the Latin word mos is elongated along the axis of arbitrary↔required, extending from "wont" or "caprice" on the one end, to "law" or "precept" on the other end:

1. "Manner, custom, way, usage, practice, fashion, wont, as determined not by the laws, but by men's will and pleasure, humor, self-will, caprice." O tempora o mores! "Oh what times, what fashions! (Cicero).
2. "The will as a rule for action, custom, usage, practice, wont, habit" Leges mori serviunt. "Laws serve custom." (Plautus).
3. In an archaic or poetic sense, and in post-Augustinian (that is, Mediaeval) Latin: "A precept, law, rule." Mos maiorum. The (unwritten) Constitution of the Roman Republic.

Thus the term mos/mor- captures the ambiguity between the official Christian view of the practice as a despicable and self-indulgent "fashion", on the one hand, and the Germanic institution sanctioned by ancient traditional "law", on the other hand (cf. Marriage à la façon du pays, "marriage according to local custom").

=== Dānicō ===
During the Viking Age, the essentially tribal entities that became the modern Scandinavian nations differed in some customs, but had a concept of themselves as a unity. For example, according to the Gray Goose Laws of the Icelandic Commonwealth recorded in 1117, Swedes, Norwegians, Icelanders and Danes spoke the same language, using dǫnsk tunga or dansk tunga ("Danish tongue") or norrønt mál ("Nordic language") to name their language, Old Norse. Here "dansk" meant "Norse". Furthermore, mos danicus (Danish dansk skik) was not merely a "Norse custom", but prevalent among other Germanic peoples such as the Franks (see above).

Rollo died in 927, and was succeeded by his son William "Long Sword," born of his union more danico with Poppa, daughter of count Berenger; he showed some attachment to the Scandinavian language, for he sent his son William to Bayeux to learn Norse.

It is also worth noting that Rollo, founder of the Norman dynasty, is claimed as Norwegian in the Norse sagas, but as Danish by the historian, William of Jumièges.

== See also ==
- Cohabitation
- Friedelehe
- Free union
- Marriage à la façon du pays

== Bibliography ==
- Adam von Bremen. History of the Archbishops of Hamburg-Bremen. Francis J. Tschan (tr. & ed.) New York: Columbia University Press, 1959. OCLC 700044.
- Freeman, Edward Augustus. The History of the Norman Conquest of England: Its Causes and Its Results. Oxford: The Clarendon Press, 1877. Vol. 1, P. 624: Note X : "Danish Marriage".
- Lewis, Charlton T., and Charles Short. A Latin Dictionary. Founded on Andrews' edition of Freund's Latin dictionary. revised, enlarged, and in great part rewritten by Charlton T. Lewis, Ph.D. and. Charles Short, LL.D. Oxford. Clarendon Press. 1879. ISBN 0-19-864201-6. Available online here.
- Orderic Vitalis. Historia Ecclesiastica.
- Reynolds, Philip Lyndon. Marriage in the Western Church: The Christianization of Marriage During the Patristic and Early Mediaeval Periods. Part V, "Germanic Law: Irregular and Informal Marriage", pp. 101 ff.. E. J. Brill: Leiden, Netherlands, 2001. ISBN 978-0-391-04108-0.
- Taylor, Henry Osborn. The Classical Heritage of the Middle Ages. Third edition. New York: The MacMillan Company, 1911.
- Thrupp, John. The Anglo-Saxon Home: A History of the Domestic Institutions and Customs of England, From the Fifth to the Eleventh Century. Longman, Green. Longman. & Roberts (1862). Republished 2002 by Adamant Media Corporation. Available online here.
- William of Jumièges, et al. Gesta Normannorum Ducum. About 1070.
