= Gisela of France =

Legendary 10th-century French princess

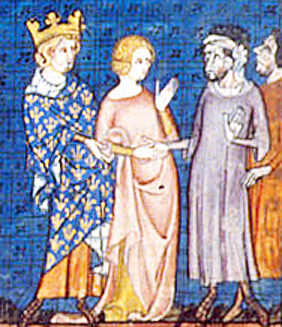
14th-century depiction of the marriage of Rollo and Gisela

According to limited early records, Gisela (French: Gisèle) was a daughter of King Charles the Simple of West Francia and wife of Duke Rollo of Normandy. There is some debate about whether she existed, and if she did, was a legitimate or illegitimate daughter of Charles.

Gisela is said to have been betrothed to Rollo after the Siege of Chartres in 911. When Rollo was defeated, he agreed to the Treaty of Saint-Clair-sur-Epte, in which he was created the first duke of Normandy, swore fealty to Charles, agreed to convert to Christianity, and married Gisela.

Norman chronicler William of Jumièges, who lived from 1000 to 1070, wrote that Rollo had two relationships: a captive taken at Bayeux, Poppa, to whom he joined himself by marriage more danico ("according to Norse custom"). Poppa was mother of Rollo's son William Longsword. He describes that Rollo put Poppa aside to marry Gisela more Cristiano ("according to Christian custom") at the time of the Treaty of Saint-Clair-sur-Epte, and that when Gisela died, he re-married Poppa, perhaps around 917. However, the absence of this royal princess from Frankish sources suggests the marriage to Gisela may be apocryphal. It is reasonably certain that Gisela had no son. If Gisela existed and bore Rollo children within a legal Christian marriage, it is unlikely that Poppa's son William would have been seen as legitimate by Christian Franks.

A character named Gisla (presented as a daughter of Charles the Bald rather than his grandson Charles the Simple, and as the mother of Rollo's children) is portrayed in the TV series Vikings by Morgane Polanski.

== Sources ==
- Bauduin, Pierre (2005). "Chefs normands et élites franques, fin -Début siècle". In Pierre Bauduin (ed.). Les Fondations scandinaves en Occident et les débuts du duché de Normandie (in French). Caen: Publications du CRAHM. pp. 181–194. ISBN 2902685289.
- van Houts, Elisabeth, ed. (2000). The Normans in Europe. Manchester University Press. ISBN 9780719047510.
