= Marriage à la façon du pays =

Common law marriages between indigenous women and French fur traders in Canada

Marriage à la façon du pays ([a la fa.sɔ̃ dy pɛ.i]; "according to the custom of the country") refers to the practice of common-law marriage between European fur traders and Aboriginal or Métis women in the North American fur trade. The practice persisted from the early 17th century until the late 19th century. It has been suggested that it fell out of practice due to increasing pressures of Catholic teaching (which requires Catholics to obtain permission to marry non-Catholics) and a growing population of non-indigenous women including the new generation of "mixed-breed" daughters who eventually replaced their native mothers as fur traders' wives. Rituals surrounding the marriages were based on a mix of European and, predominantly, Indigenous customs.

The presence of women in the factories (i.e. trading posts) of what is now Canada had been banned by the Hudson's Bay Company as early as 1683. Intermarriage was common from the start of the fur trade and by 1739 the company overturned its ban. The practice was both a social and a political institution, securing trade relations between Europeans and aboriginals, just as intermarriage between tribes was a political instrument of the aboriginals themselves.

Women played several important roles in the Canadian fur trade. Indigenous women assisted with the survival and care of the fur traders who overwintered in North America. Europeans were less experienced with the vegetation, wildlife, and seasonal rhythms of North America, so they often relied heavily on the indigenous people for their survival. These marriages often came with the expectation that they would secure trade between the woman's relations and the trader and in times of need, would provide mutual aid. Sometimes, it may also have been the hope of the woman's family that the trader's generosity would increase after the marriage. The marriages between these two groups led to the creation of people referred to as Métis. One writer referred to them as the offspring of the fur trade. For the fur traders, indigenous women provided intimacy and companionship, as well as playing an economic role in the relationship by producing foods, including pemmican, and suitable winter clothing for the trader's survival.

== Pre-contact Indigenous women ==
Before contact, Indigenous infant mortality rates were like infant mortality rates for pre-contact Europeans, and the overall mortality rate for both cultures was comparable. The difference was that Indigenous women breastfed longer than mothers in other parts of the world, including Europe, Asia, and Africa, because Indigenous people in North America did not have domesticated animals from which they could get milk for their children. So although the Indigenous population had similar mortality rates, they had lower pregnancy rates.

== The fur trade ==
The North American fur trade began in the seventeenth century when European and Aboriginal people began meeting at the St. Lawrence River to trade goods. The Europeans were mainly interested in buying furs for the luxury fur and felt market in Europe. Beaver pelts for use in millinery were particularly sought after. Aboriginal people knew the best places and methods for trapping, and therefore became valuable procurers for the Europeans. Because European traders did not know the Canadian landscape and climate, they needed Aboriginal assistance to survive. In contrast, Aboriginal people were interested in European goods that they previously had no access to, such as metal pots and utensils. As trade continued, the Ojibwe people would act as middlemen for the traders, bringing goods into the western interior to trade with the Cree and Assiniboine, and bringing furs back to the Europeans. As the trade progressed into the eighteenth century, the Cree and Assiniboine people would start becoming middlemen themselves, increasing their participation in the trade. As more Aboriginal people became involved in the trade, it became apparent that personal relationships were becoming an important aspect of the process. Fostering relationships was valuable for securing trade access and loyalty between Native groups and European traders. Some historians even believe that this is what caused the great success of the fur trade. For example, Brenda Macdougall writes that Aboriginal people refused to trade only for economic reasons, illuminating how personal relationships were pivotal for the success of the fur trade.

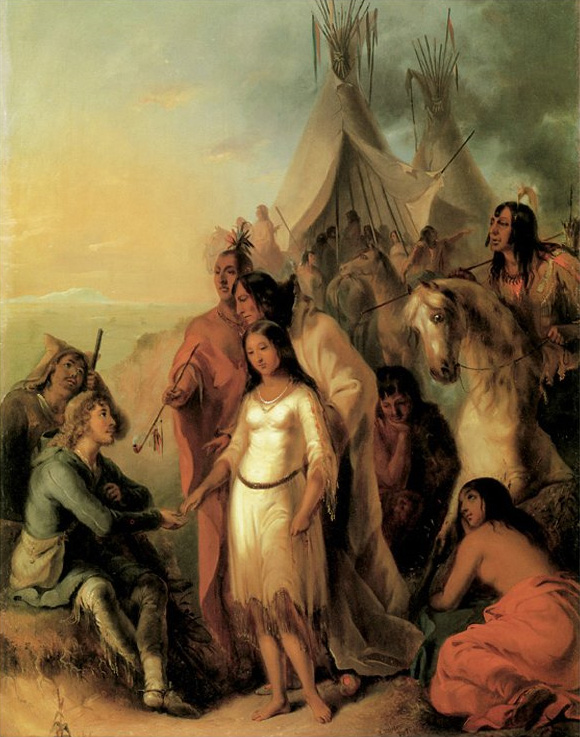
The Trapper's Bride, Alfred Jacob Miller, 1845

=== Aboriginal women in the fur trade ===
Aboriginal women were also starting to foster important bonds with the traders at the same time the men were. Women's labour produced various goods that would become very important for the traders. These goods included wild rice, maple sugar, and woven mats. The women's production of food would become increasingly important to the traders when trade locations shifted to Native villages. Traders would have to depend on the food supply obtained from Aboriginal women for survival. For example, traders living in Ojibwe villages would consume a large amount of rice during their stays. Additionally, women were able to take part in the trade of goods that Aboriginal men and women made together. Ojibwe women contributed by making canoes used to take part in the trades. The trade of canoes allowed the Aboriginal women to obtain a wide range of goods for themselves. Since many Aboriginal women were also in charge of processing the furs that the men brought back, this gave the women a great deal of authority in the trading of the final product. Because of this division of labour, the fur trade consisted of multiple interwoven relationships between Aboriginal men, Aboriginal women, and male European traders. Moreover, these relationships illuminate that Aboriginal women had some forms of agency and control from the beginning of the fur trade.

The different relationships between the Aboriginal people and the traders highlight how the trade became interdependent. Both Europeans and Aboriginal people would become reliant on each other to sustain the fur trade and their way of life. Many scholars have contemplated whether these relationships of interdependency were positive for everyone involved. For example, Mary C. Wright believes that while Aboriginal women were an important contributor to the success of the fur trade, their informal relationships with European men ultimately remained unrecognized and therefore left them with no more power than they had before the trade had begun. In contrast, Sylvia Van Kirk believes that even though the benefits that Aboriginal women gained were questionable, they were ultimately able to secure certain advantages for themselves through marriage. Despite historians questioning their power relationships within the fur trade, it is ultimately apparent that Aboriginal women were active participants in fur trade society.

=== The domestic roles played by Indigenous women ===
In fur-trade society, there was a severe imbalance of genders. Only men were permitted to travel overseas from Europe to North America because the frontier was not seen as safe for "civilized" women. This meant that there were many more men than women, and the available women were Indigenous. The fur traders who came to Canada were away from home for years, leaving them longing for a life that felt like home. Marriage a la façon du pays (according to the custom of the country) meant that European fur traders would marry Indigenous women, more by Indigenous customs than European because Catholic priests would not agree to such a union. These marriages were taken seriously by the fur traders and the Indigenous families even though they were not a legal agreement according to the Church. European suitors were required to pay a bride price to her family. Often the agreement was a horse for a wife. One account from a trader was that he was required to pay her family 15 guns and 15 blankets as well as other items in order to take his bride.

At first, the Hudson's Bay Company (HBC) forbade their men from marrying or having sexual relations with Indigenous women. There were HBC men that defied those orders and married anyway. Soon the HBC realized that there were advantages to having marriage ties to the First Nations people in the area.

The North West Company (NWC) was a little more forward-thinking than HBC and encouraged marriages between their officers and Indigenous women. For the fur traders who were away from their home for many years at a time, having a relationship with a woman made life more bearable. To add to that, having children in the house-made things even better. A fur trader who had a wife to look after the house when he is away and to prepare meals and mend clothing would be better off than a trader who is alone to do all the work on his own. There would be more mouths to feed but living with a family would have been healthier than living in isolation. Life was more bearable when the trader had someone to share it with.

Indigenous women who married fur traders tended to have more children than those who married tribally. Traditionally, Indigenous women would have a child every three to four years. This could be attributed to the length of time women breastfed, which somewhat inhibited ovulation. An Indigenous woman who lived with her tribe may have had about four children from 18 to 30 years old. However, a woman who married a fur trader would have had a significantly higher number of births. A woman who married a fur trader at age 18 may have had seven or more children by the time she was 30. This could be attributed to her husband's expectations and a different diet than her tribally wed peers. Many tribes made annual migrations, especially Plains tribes. Whether a woman lived as a settler or lived a migratory life would impact the number of children she had. Traditionally women co-mothered their children, but an Indigenous woman who married a fur trader was likely to have raised children on her own, which also adds to the workload of parenting.

When a fur trader married an Indigenous woman, he gained sexual and domestic rights to her in exchange for her family receiving rights to the trading posts and to other provisions brought from Europe. It was a reciprocal relationship that benefited both sides. The woman would have benefitted economically by having first access to certain goods such as tools, glass beads, sewing needles, and knives. Having access to European tools meant a lighter workload for the Indigenous people. For example, copper pots and pans lasted longer than clay and were lighter to carry, changing how women worked. A benefit to the fur trader was that his wife's family would reliably return to trade with him. Also, he benefited from having a companion with whom he could share work and leisure time. Intermarriage between traders and First Nations women was encouraged because it helped the fur trade industry grow.

=== The economic roles played by Indigenous women ===
Indigenous women played an important role in the Canadian fur trade. They supported men who were trading, and many women were trappers and traders themselves. Other markets expanded and thrived during the fur trade years. One of those markets was the pemmican market, where Indigenous and Métis women made and traded pemmican with the Europeans. Without access to pemmican, winters for all people in the Northwest could be devastating. Having an Indigenous wife was one way to better secure an ample supply of pemmican. In addition, indigenous wives became language interpreters and cultural liaisons between their fur trader husbands and their family of origin or tribal connections. When the men began coming from Europe, they did not know how to do many of the jobs required for survival. Their Native wives helped them to learn these tasks, such as making snowshoes, canoes, clothing, and arguably most important, moccasins. The women knew how to prepare and cook the food of the land and preserved foods such as pemmican for the winter months. Without the knowledge that their Indigenous wives held, these fur traders would not have been able to last through the winters.

Aside from women being the connector between the cultures, they were also keen businesswomen in winter food and clothing production. Indigenous mothers taught their daughters to bead and carry on other important cultural arts. Eventually, their descendants would become what were known as "the flower beadwork people". The elaborate beadwork designs were an important source of income for Indigenous and Métis women, especially when their fur trader husbands could be away for months at a time.

== Origin and purpose ==
The purpose of a marriage à la façon du pays was, from the European perspective, to provide the European husband with an advantage over his competitor in the fur trade business. While the Native women fulfilled traditional marital roles as sexual partners and possessed valuable skills such as cooking, sewing, and moccasin- and snowshoe-making, their most attractive feature was the promise of economic prosperity. This was achieved when a Native wife acted as a cultural intermediary between her people and the European fur traders. These marriages were not used to assimilate Indigenous women into European culture but instead worked to create a cultural middle ground where the exchange of goods could take place peacefully. Aboriginal women often acted as interpreters for traders and trappers, as well as negotiating deals. This inclusion in his wife's Native community guaranteed the European husband steady, easy access to furs.

The marriages were conducted using the traditions of the group that the woman came from. Marriages were much less formal than those in Europe, and were often consecrated by the bride's family based on the exchange of a bride-price. Unlike European marriages performed by clergy members, these unions were not seen as permanent. Both parties understood they could leave the marriage if they were dissatisfied or no longer interested in the union. Some of the men involved had wives in their home country, and would later leave their North American wives. In Native communities, the exchange of women was common among allies, and Native leaders expected that the European traders would reciprocate their offers of Native women in the form of access to trading posts and provisions. Bruce M. White has also identified the importance that Native people placed on the giving of gifts and respect, and the reciprocation of said gifts and respect, in order to keep the fur trade running smoothly.

For a Native woman, engaging in a marriage à la façon du pays could be just as beneficial to her as it was to her husband. According to Susan Sleeper-Smith, establishing these relationships was a process of cultural and economic adaptation bred out of necessity. Furthermore, Sleeper-Smith claims that being married to a European fur trader increased the authority of his Indigenous wife and the importance of the entire community. Native women were able to build networks through kinship and religion (specifically Catholicism), making trade easier and "allowing these women to negotiate for themselves positions of prominence and power". In fact, some women gained enough power that they faced opposition from other traders, who objected to their control over trading practices. Some, such as Magdalaine Marcot la Framboise and her sister Thérèse Marcot Lasalier Schindler, became so powerful that they were able to set themselves up as independent fur traders.

== Decline ==
Marriages between fur traders and Indigenous women declined after the turn of the nineteenth century when intermarriage became less politically and economically advantageous on both sides. Marriage-based alliances became less important to trade relations as trading became more established. An influx of European and Métis women in the Canadian and American West gave European traders more options for marriage and companionship. Both Métis and European wives were seen as more appropriate partners, due to growing anti-Aboriginal prejudice and other social and cultural reasons. Bringing more Native women into the forts and factories also put a greater financial burden on the trading companies. The increase in European traders and settlers in the West also made marriage customs more closely resemble those from Europe. Growing missionary presence condemned marriage by "Indian rules".

In general, prolonged exposure to European men and settlers brewed animosity among Indigenous women and their communities, discouraging women from forming partnerships. Van Kirk has also argued that over time conditions for Native women living with European men deteriorated. The women were often more exposed to disease, and the burden of having more children at smaller intervals placed strains on their health. Cultural differences, especially regarding who had control over raising the child, also caused animosity and discouraged intermarriage. In addition, some Indigenous groups would prevent certain traders from marrying their women, or entirely ban relationships with European traders. The North West Company eventually banned the practice of intermarriage for employees in 1806, though marriage to Métis women was allowed. Though they continued to occur throughout the nineteenth century, marriages à la façon du pays would decrease significantly over the following decades.

Once European women began arriving in Western Canada, many fur traders abandoned their Native wives for the "preferred" Europeans. Many fur traders left the marriages à la façon du pays because they did not see them as legally binding. When fur traders retired, some would stay in North America, but others would return to their European homeland for good. Those returning to their country of origin would leave behind their Native wife and children. Sometimes, when a trader retired and a younger trader took his position, that younger trader would also assume the partnership with the abandoned woman. The NWC was often bombarded with requests for support from the abandoned or widowed wives. The woman, along with the children from the marriage, would usually return to her family of origin. The forts were experiencing increased numbers of women seeking assistance since their husbands had abandoned them This left many children being raised with the help of their matrilineal families.

There are also many examples of marriages that lasted for years, with the husband writing about his grief after the death of his beloved wife. Many fur traders thought that their Indigenous wives were exceptional mothers and partners.

== Legacy ==
The Métis communities that developed in areas such as the Red River Colony and the Great Lakes region are based upon the connections from relationships between Aboriginal women and French men as they created fur trading posts and factories throughout the West. The Métis communities were distinctive because of the intensity of the connections to both the French Catholic social and economic networks and the Native lives that the women were already used to living. The Aboriginal women who became mothers to the Métis community were mainly from the Cree and Ojibwe tribes. The Métis communities became one of the most influential ties between the Aboriginal peoples and the Europeans. Macdougall noted that the Métis people were influential to the running of the fur trade and even one of the major determining factors in how the fur trade came to be run.

Marriage for Métis people, especially young Métis men, became quite difficult because of their strong connections to both Native traditions and French customs, leading to many marriages being potentially seen as illegitimate. The Métis families began marrying between Métis kin, particularly those situated around the Great Lakes who were parts of the much larger fur trade communities. This intermarriage led to an extremely distinctive culture of Métis people in the Great Lakes and the Canadian West. In contrast to many minority groups, the Métis people made a conscious effort to be non-conformist. This and their distinctive identity led to several conflicts between the Métis, European settlers, and the Canadian government throughout the nineteenth century, such as the Red River Rebellion. The government of Alberta has made the official distinction for Métis people by saying that the Métis are those who fail to meet the social and legal distinctions of Native or European but are the offspring of both.

== See also ==
- King's Daughters or Filles du Roy
- Filles à la cassette
- Custom of Paris in New France
- Common-law relationships in Manitoba
- More danico, marriage according to the Norse custom
