= Notre-Dame-de-la-Mer =

- Commune
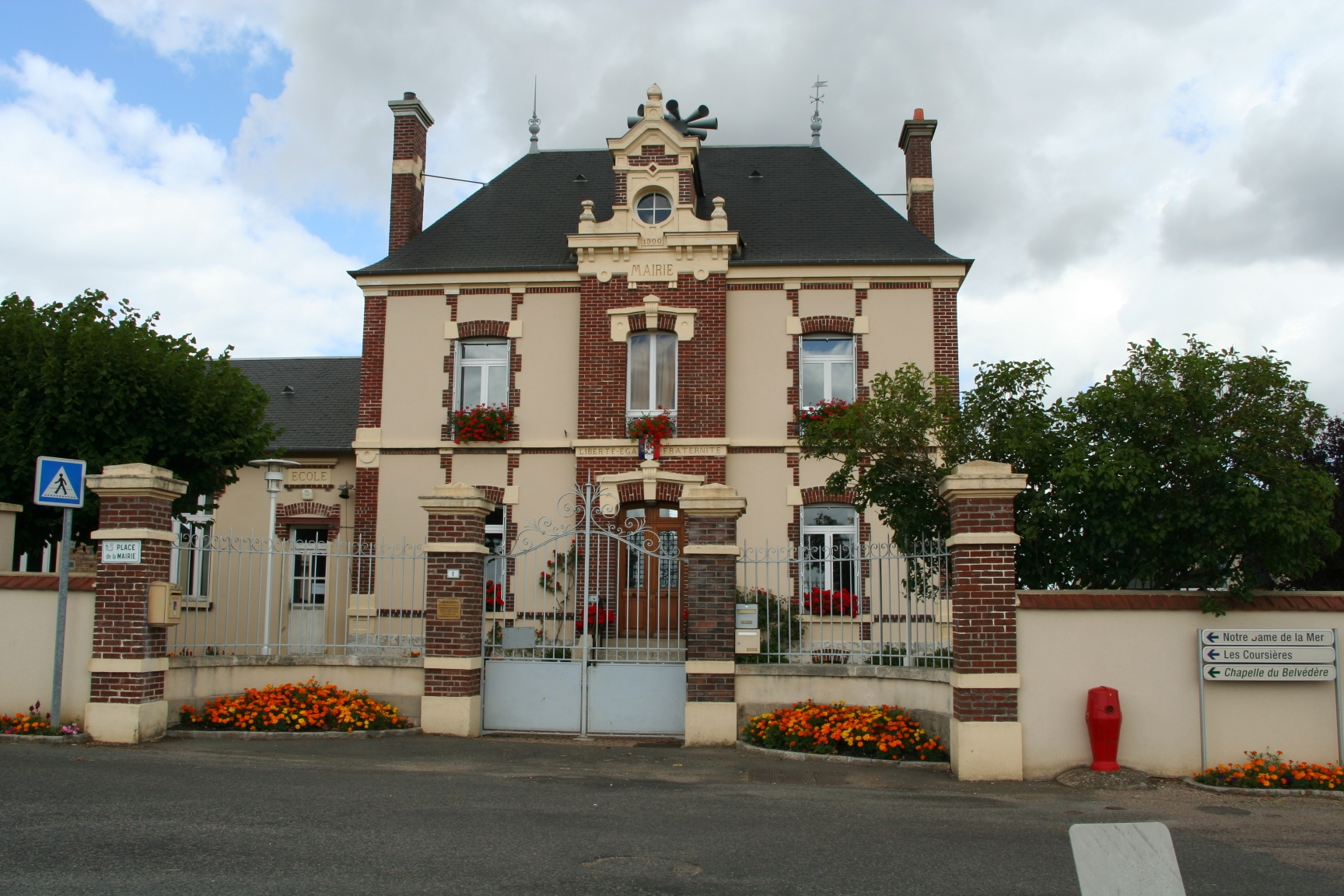
- The town hall in Jeufosse
- Location of Notre-Dame-de-la-Mer
- Location within France Location within Île-de-France (region)
- Coordinates: 49°02′07″N 1°32′48″E
- Country: France
- Region: Île-de-France
- Department: Yvelines
- Arrondissement: Mantes-la-Jolie
- Canton: Bonnières-sur-Seine
- Intercommunality: Portes de l'Île-de-France

Government
  - Mayor (2021–2026): Jean-Luc Mailloc
- Area^{1}: 8.92 km^{2} (3.44 sq mi)
- Highest elevation: 143 m (469 ft)
- Lowest elevation: 10 m (33 ft)
- Population (2023): 742
  - Density: 83.2/km^{2} (215/sq mi)
- Time zone: UTC+01:00 (CET)
  - Summer (DST): UTC+02:00 (CEST)
- INSEE/Postal code: 78320 /78270
- ^{1} French Land Register data, which excludes lakes, ponds, glaciers > 1 km^{2} (0.386 sq mi or 247 acres) and river estuaries.

Notre-Dame-de-la-Mer (French pronunciation: [nɔtʁə dam də la mɛʁ]) is a commune in the Yvelines department in the Île-de-France region in north-central France. It was established on 1 January 2019 by merger of the former communes of Jeufosse (the seat) and Port-Villez.

== See also ==
- Communes of the Yvelines department
