= Hagano =

Frankish nobleman (fl. 918–922)

Hagano was a petty nobleman (mediocris) who achieved influence in Lotharingia and West Francia during the rule of Charles the Simple (898–922). He was a relative of Charles' first wife, Frederuna, and was originally from Lotharingia. Though Frederuna had died in 917, by 918 Hagano had become the king's favourite and his most trusted advisor. The aristocracy despised him, however, and the authority of Charles over the nobles was severely weakened by Hagano's presence at court. Charles' sin appears to be transferring grants in benefice, especially of monasteries, from his barons to Hagano.

In 919, the West Frankish barons refused to assist the king in repelling a Magyar invasion. One of the leading Lotharingian barons, Gilbert, threw his support behind Henry the Fowler, the German king, and, according to Flodoard, was elected "prince" (princeps) by the Lotharingian aristocracy. Flodoard also records that Robert of Neustria made a treaty with the Vikings without royal permission. When, in 922, Charles granted Hagano Chelles, at that time already held by Rothilde, a daughter of Charles the Bald, the barons of West Francia revolted and made Robert king in Charles' place.

French historian Charles Bémont edited a document (#5 in manuscript 9016 of the Bibliothèque nationale de France) for the pièces justificatives of his biography of Simon de Montfort in which a baron reminds Henry III of England of what happened to "Charles l'Assoté" when he listened too closely to unpopular advisors.
