= Jeufosse =

- Part of Notre-Dame-de-la-Mer
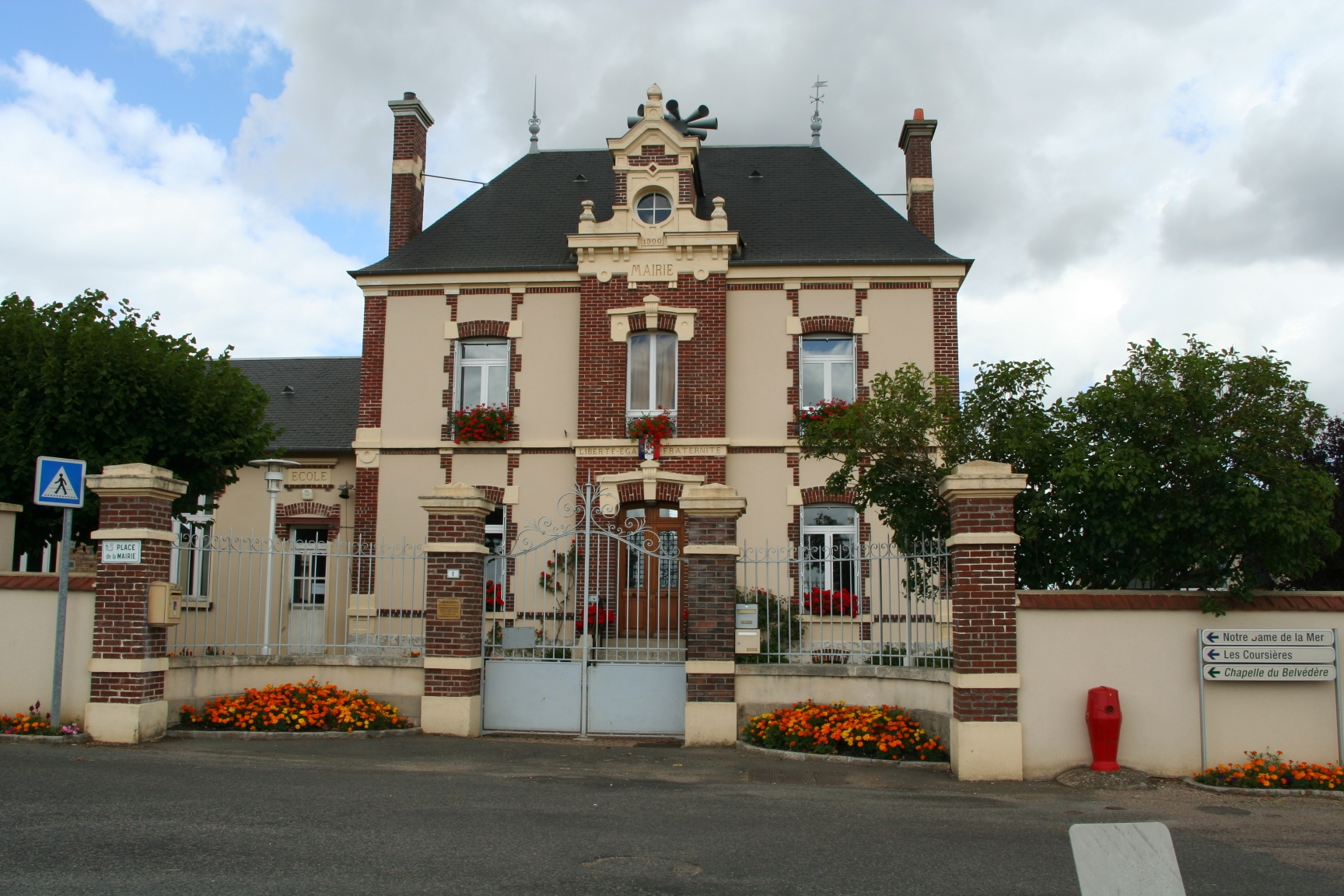
- The town hall in Jeufosse
- Location of Jeufosse
- Location within France Location within Île-de-France (region)
- Coordinates: 49°02′07″N 1°32′48″E
- Country: France
- Region: Île-de-France
- Department: Yvelines
- Arrondissement: Mantes-la-Jolie
- Canton: Bonnières-sur-Seine
- Commune: Notre-Dame-de-la-Mer
- Area^{1}: 3.57 km^{2} (1.38 sq mi)
- Elevation: 128 m (420 ft)
- Highest elevation: 143 m (469 ft)
- Lowest elevation: 12 m (39 ft)
- Population (2019): 418
  - Density: 117/km^{2} (303/sq mi)
- Time zone: UTC+01:00 (CET)
  - Summer (DST): UTC+02:00 (CEST)
- Postal code: 78270
- ^{1} French Land Register data, which excludes lakes, ponds, glaciers > 1 km^{2} (0.386 sq mi or 247 acres) and river estuaries.

Jeufosse (French pronunciation: [ʒøfos]) is a former commune in the Yvelines department in the Île-de-France region in north-central France. On 1 January 2019, it was merged into the new commune Notre-Dame-de-la-Mer.

== See also ==
- Communes of the Yvelines department
