= Politics of Normandy =

Normandy is one of the 13 administrative regions of Metropolitan France. The modern region was created on 1 January 2016 by reunification of the separate regions Lower Normandy and Upper Normandy. Rouen is the regional capital, while Caen is the seat of the regional council.

The new region took effect on 1 January 2016, after the regional elections in December 2015.

== Government ==
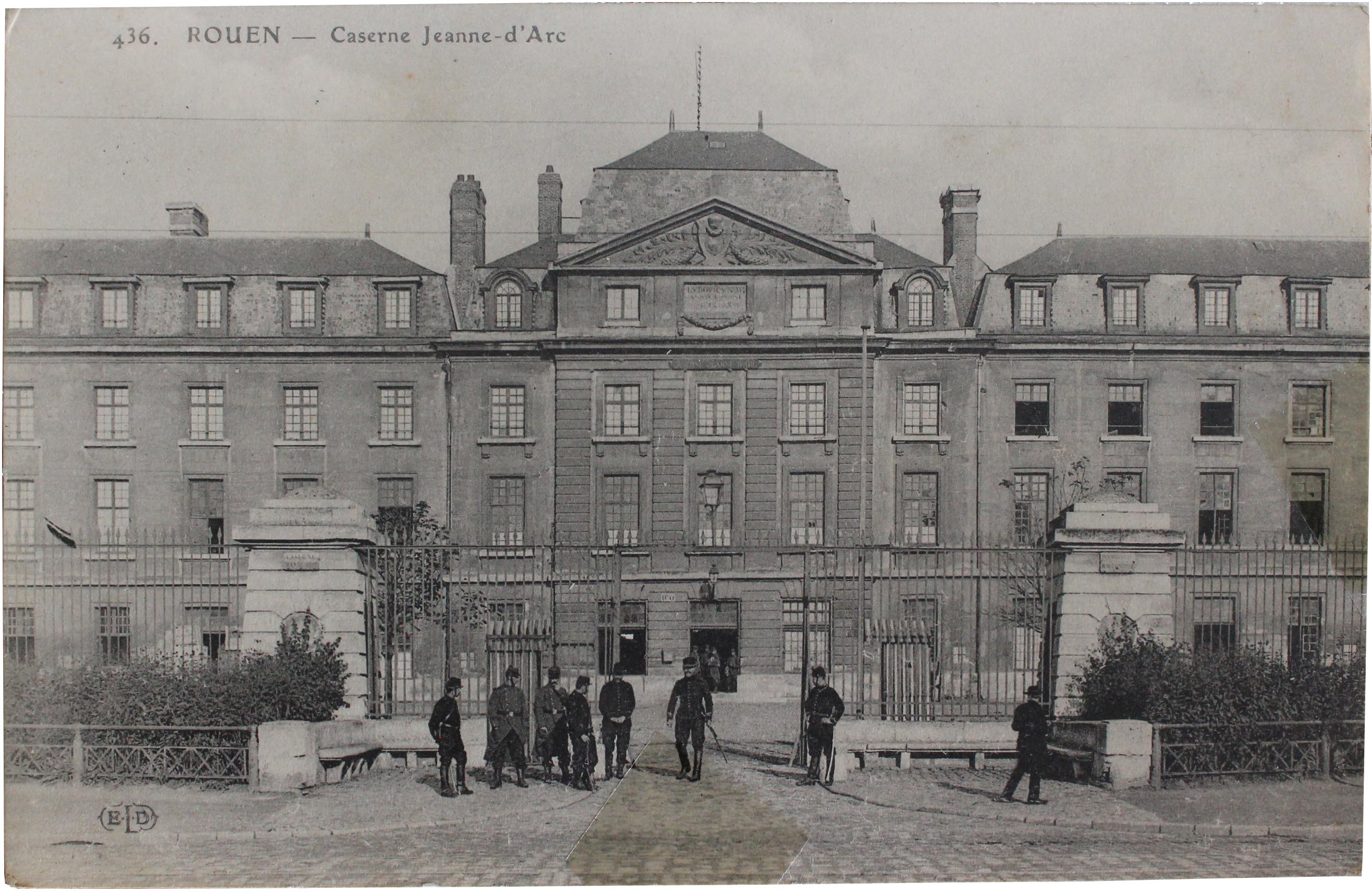
Historic photograph of the Caserne Jeanne d'Arc in the capital city Rouen, today seat of the Norman regional assembly

The Regional Council which has 102 members who are elected under a system of proportional representation. The executive consists of a president and vice-presidents.

=== President ===
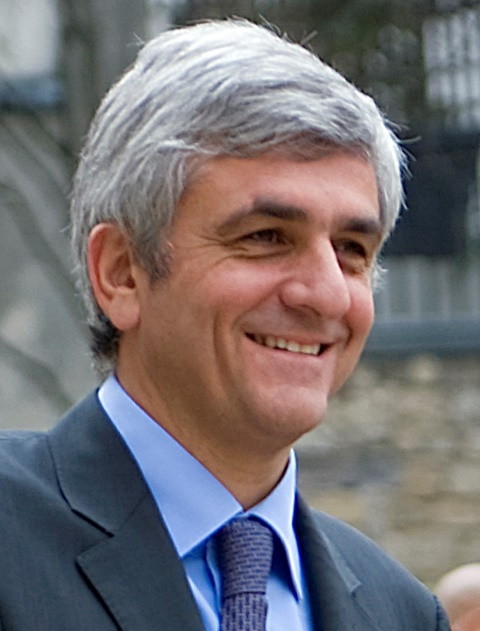
Hervé Morin, president of the regional council since 2016

Name	Election	Left office	Party
Hervé Morin	4 January 2016	Present	New Centre

== See also ==
- Politics of France
