= Frederuna =

Queen of France from 907 to 917

Frederuna von Sachsen
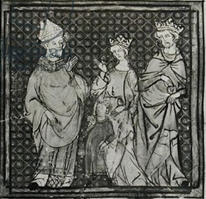
- 14th-century depiction of Charles III alongside one of his wives

Queen consort of France
- Tenure: 907–917
- Born: 887; Goslar, Hanover, Lower Saxony, Germany
- Died: 917 (aged 29–30); Lorraine, France
- Spouse: Charles III of France (m. 907)
- Issue: Gisela of France; Frederuna; Adelais; Rotrude; Hildegarde; Ermentrude

Frederuna, Frederonne, or Fridarun (French: Frédérune or Frérone; 887–917) was the queen consort of France by marriage to its king, Charles III the Simple.

Modern historians have proven her true parents are unrecorded. Her dowry charter only verifies that she was of noble Frankish/Lotharingian blood, had a brother named Bovo (Bishop of Châlons), and a cousin named Berengar. If she were the daughter of a major, powerful regional ruler like Dietrich of Ringelheim (as later myths claimed), Charles would have explicitly named him to boast about the political alliance. Instead, the charter only vaguely notes she is of "noble blood".

She bore Charles six daughters: Ermentrude, Gisela, Frederuna, Adelais, Rotrude and Hildegarde. Frederuna died in 917 and she was succeeded as queen consort by Eadgifu of England, a daughter of Edward the Elder in 919.

Royal titles
Preceded by Théodrate of Troyes	Queen consort of Western Francia; 907–917	Succeeded by Eadgifu of England
