= Charles the Simple =

King of West Francia from 898 to 922

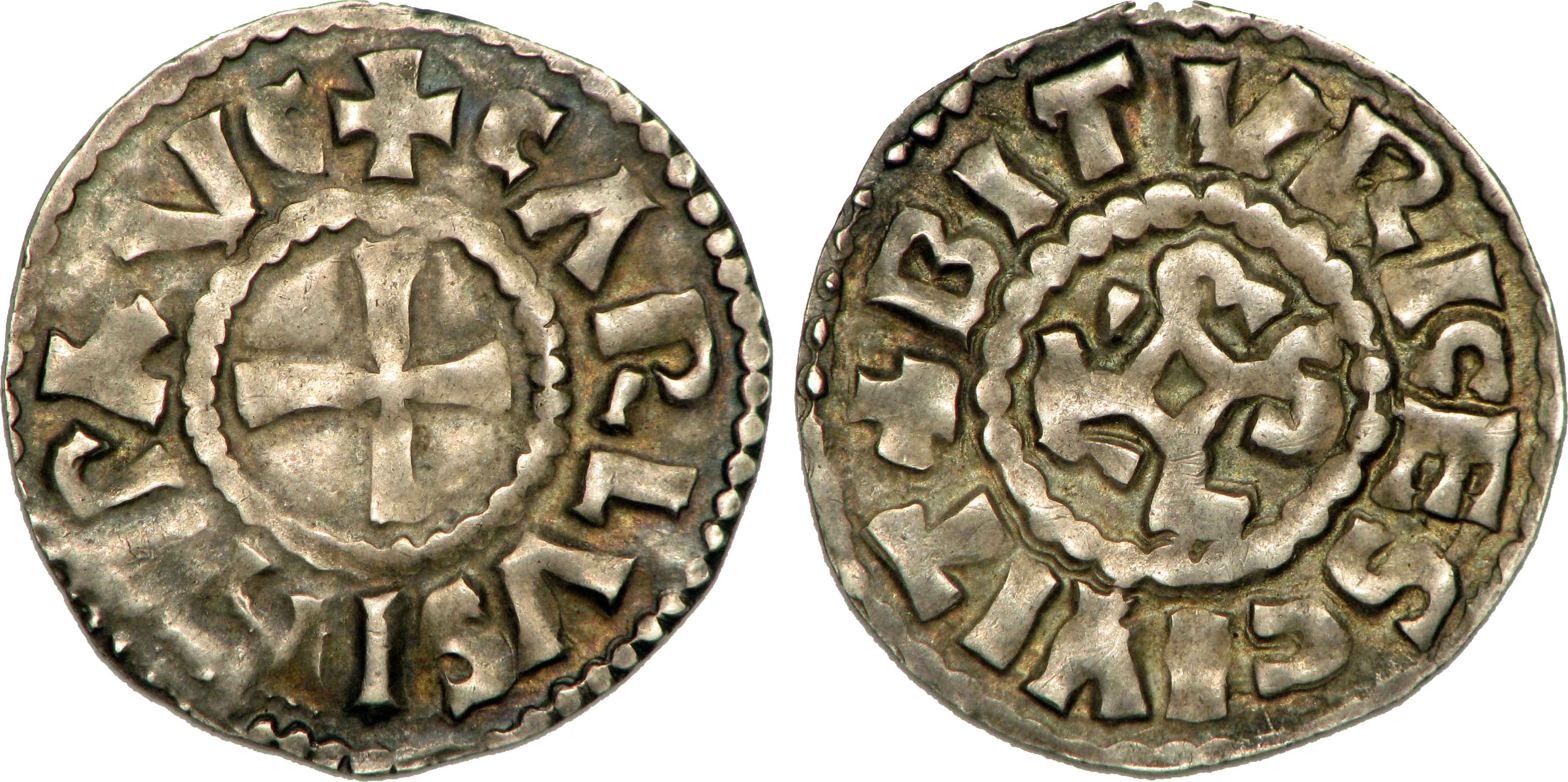

King of West Francia
- Reign: 1 January 898 – 2 July 922
- Predecessor: Odo I
- Successor: Robert I

King of Lotharingia
- Reign: c. September 911 – 15 June 923
- Predecessor: Louis the Child
- Born: 17 September 879
- Died: 7 October 929 (aged 50); Péronne, France
- Burial: Collégiale Saint-Fursy de Péronne, France
- Spouses: Frederuna (m. 907; d. 917); Eadgifu of Wessex (m. 919)
- Issue more...: Gisela of France; Louis IV of France
- Dynasty: Carolingian
- Father: Louis the Stammerer
- Mother: Adelaide of Paris

Charles III (17 September 879 – 7 October 929), called the Simple or the Straightforward (from the Latin Carolus Simplex), (Note: His nickname "Simplex" or "the Simple" can be misleading. The Latin simplex was given to mean 'straightforward', as in loyal or without guile. The nickname "the Simple" has stuck with him even though its meaning has been corrupted. He was not, however, generally complimented by the chroniclers. He was called Charles the Stupid by a later chronicler for an incident in 919 where he abandoned his men. Besides this, he was called stultus ('fatuous'), hebes ('stupid'), insipiens ('foolish'), parvus ('small') and minor ('inferior').) was the king of West Francia from 898 until 922 and the king of Lotharingia from 911 until 919–923. He was a member of the Carolingian dynasty.

== Early life ==
Charles was the third and posthumous son of King Louis the Stammerer by his second wife Adelaide of Paris. As a child, Charles was prevented from succeeding to the throne at the time of the death in 884 of his half-brother, king Carloman II. Instead, Frankish nobles of the realm asked his cousin, Emperor Charles the Fat, to assume the crown. He was also prevented from succeeding the unpopular Charles the Fat, who was deposed in November 887 and died in January 888, although it is unknown if his overthrow was accepted or even made known in West Francia before his death. The nobility then elected Odo, the hero of the Siege of Paris (885–886) as the new king, although there was a faction that supported claims of Guy III of Spoleto. The young Charles was put under the protection of Ranulf II, the Duke of Aquitaine, who may have tried to claim the throne for him and in the end used the royal title himself until making peace with Odo.

== King of West Francia ==
In 893, at the age of 14, Charles was crowned by a faction opposed to the rule of Odo at the Reims Cathedral, becoming monarch of West Francia only after the death of Odo in 898.

In 911, a group of Vikings led by Rollo besieged Paris and Chartres. After a victory near Chartres on 26 August, Charles decided to negotiate with Rollo, resulting in the Treaty of Saint-Clair-sur-Epte which created the Duchy of Normandy. In return for the Vikings' loyalty, they were granted all the land between the river Epte and the sea, as well as Duchy of Brittany, which at the time was an independent country which West Francia had unsuccessfully tried to conquer. Rollo also agreed to be baptised and to marry Charles's daughter Gisela.

== King of Lotharingia ==
Also in 911, Louis the Child, the last Carolingian king of East Francia died, and nobles of Lotharingia, who had been loyal to him, under the leadership of Reginar, Duke of Lorraine declared Charles their new king, breaking from East Francia which had elected non-Carolingian Conrad I as the new king. Charles had tried to win Lotharingian support for years, for instance, by marrying in April 907 a Lotharingian woman named Frederuna, and in 909 his niece Cunigunda married Wigeric of Lotharingia. Charles defended Lotharingia against two attacks by Conrad I. In 925, Lotharingia was once again seized by East Francia.

== Revolt of the nobles ==
Realms ruled by Charles the Simple in 915 (red)

Queen Frederuna died on 10 February 917 leaving six daughters and no sons—and thus uncertainty as to the succession. On 7 October 919 Charles married Eadgifu, the daughter of Edward the Elder, King of England, who bore him a son, the future King Louis IV of France.

By this time, Charles's excessive favouritism towards a certain Hagano, a petty nobleman (mediocris) and a relative of Charles's first wife Frederuna, had turned the aristocracy against him. He endowed Hagano with monasteries that were already the benefices of other barons, alienating them. In Lotharingia, he earned the enmity of the new duke Gilbert, who in 919 declared loyalty to the new king of East Francia Henry the Fowler. Opposition to Charles in Lotharingia was not universal, however; he retained the support of Wigeric.

The nobles, completely exasperated with Charles's policies and especially his favouritism of Count Hagano, seized Charles in 920. After negotiations by Archbishop Herveus of Reims the king was released.

In 922, the Frankish nobles revolted again led by Robert of Neustria. Robert, who was Odo's brother, was elected king by the rebels and crowned, while Charles had to flee to Lotharingia. On 2 July 922, Charles lost his most faithful supporter, Herveus of Reims, who had succeeded Fulk in 900. Charles returned with a Norman army in 923 but was defeated on 15 June at the Battle of Soissons by Robert, who died in the battle. Charles was captured and imprisoned in a castle at Péronne under the guard of Herbert II of Vermandois. Robert's son-in-law Rudolph of Burgundy was then elected to succeed him as king.

Charles died in prison on 7 October 929 and was buried at the nearby abbey of Saint-Fursy. His son by Eadgifu would eventually be crowned in 936 as Louis IV of France. In the initial aftermath of Charles's defeat, Queen Eadgifu and their children fled to England.

=== Background ===
On 6 December 884, King Carloman II of West Francia died without a male heir and his half-brother, the future Charles the Simple, was just a five-year-old boy. Because of this, their cousin Charles the Fat, already Holy Roman Emperor and King of East Francia, was invited by the nobles of the Kingdom to assume the throne. Since the beginning, the new monarch was forced to deal with constant Viking raids, with little success. After three years of incompetent government, Charles the Fat was finally deposed by the Diet of Tribur in 887.

Faced with the growing threat of northern invaders, the local nobles again rejected the succession of Charles the Simple because he was too young, and Odo, Count of Paris (member of the Robertian dynasty) was chosen as the new King of West Francia, after successfully defending Paris against the Vikings, led by Rollo. In 893, aided by Archbishop Fulk of Reims, Charles the Simple attempted to reclaim the throne, but in vain. By 897, the young prince ruled only the city of Laon before Odo on his deathbed designated him as his successor.

Following the death of Odo in January 898, Charles the Simple finally assumed the title of king of West Francia. Soon the new monarch showed his ambition to conquer Lotharingia, the main objective of all the monarchs of West Francia since Charles the Bald. Lotharingia was the cradle of the Carolingian dynasty. Charlemagne's ancestors, the Pippinids were from Lotharingia (Herstal, Jupille...). After the Treaty of Verdun in 843, the Lotharingia was part of Middle Francia for a short time and both West and East Francia tried to gain control over it. Arnulf of Carinthia, King of East Francia prevented this by entrusting the land to his son Zwentibold in 895. Zwentibold was hated by his subjects, so Charles the Simple decided to invade in 898 after being called by Count Reginar of Hainaut. After seizing Aachen and capturing Charlemagne's Palace at Nijmegen, he returned to France at the request of the German bishops. A few years later, in September 911, the Lotharingian aristocracy again called on Charles the Simple after the death of Louis the Child, the last Carolingian ruler in East Francia.

Charles the Simple was crowned King of Lotharingia in early November 911. However, the constant absences of the new monarch (who preferred to stay in Aachen or Thionville), quickly irritated the Lotharingian nobility (who feared for their own independence) and nobles of France, who saw this inclination as an affront. The situation was even more complicated because, according to Flodoard, Charles the Simple refused to march against the Hungarians who threatened Lotharingia (only Archbishop Hervé de Reims was present there) and finally caused an open rebellion when he attempted to dispossess his own aunt, Abbess Rothilde (also mother-in-law of Hugh the Great), from Chelles Abbey in order to give it to his favourite, Hagano (a relative of his first wife Frederuna).

=== Deposition ===
From 920 to 922, Charles the Simple was in trouble. Although he signed the Treaty of Bonn with king Henry the Fowler of East Francia on 7 November 921, he had to fight on two fronts: one against Duke Giselbert of Lotharingia and the other against Hugh the Great, irritated by the treatment of his mother-in-law. Defeated, in June 922 Charles the Simple took refuge in Lotharingia. The nobles of West Francia declared him deposed from the throne, choosing as the new King Robert, Count of Paris, brother of the late King Odo and father of Hugh the Great.

Charles the Simple returned to France to regain the throne. His army, supported by a Lotharingian army and a group of soldiers, faced King Robert's army at Soissons in June 923. According to Richerus, Robert was killed in battle by Count Fulbert or according to other historians, by Charles the Simple. Despite the death of Robert, his army won the battle and Charles the Simple had to escape from the battlefield. The French nobles elected Rudolph of France (Robert's son-in-law) as their new King, with his coronation taking place on 13 July 923 at St Médard, Soissons.

During the summer, Charles the Simple was captured by Herbert II, Count of Vermandois, (another son-in-law of King Robert) at Château-Thierry; meanwhile, King Henry I of Germany took advantage of the situation to seize and add Lotharingia to his domains, after giving his daughter Gerberga of Saxony in marriage to Duke Giselbert.

After some time at Château-Thierry, the humiliated Charles the Simple was transferred in 924 to Péronne, where he died on 7 October 929 and was immediately buried in the local Monastery of Saint-Fursy. The legitimate Carolingian heir was now Louis, but King Rudolph retained the throne and ruled until his death from illness on 15 January 936 at Auxerre, being buried in the Abbey of Sainte-Colombe of Sens. The nobility then discussed who could be the next king, because Rudolph left no sons. Finally, the nobles unanimously summoned back Louis to France, thanks to the decisive support of Hugh the Great, to become their new king.

== Family ==
Charles first married in May 907 to Frederuna. Together they had six daughters:

- Ermentrude
- Frederuna
- Adelaide
- Gisela, wife of Rollo
- Rotrude
- Hildegarde

Charles married for the second time in 919 to Eadgifu of Wessex. Together they had one son:

- Louis IV of France (10 September 920 – 10 September 954), who eventually succeeded to the throne of West Francia in 936

Charles also had several other offspring:

- Arnulf
- Drogo
- Roricone († 976), Bishop of Laon
- Alpais, who married Erlebold, count of Lommegau.

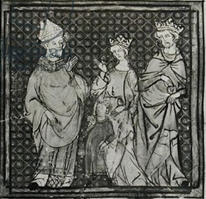
14th century depiction of Charles alongside one of his wives and a child.

== Notes ==
Charles the Simple Carolingian dynasty Born: 17 September 879 Died: 7 October 929
| Preceded by Odo | King of West Francia; 898–922 | Succeeded by Robert I |
| Preceded by Louis the Child | King of Lotharingia; 911–919/23 | Vacant Title abandoned |
