= Robert I of France =

King of West Francia from 922 to 923

Robert I
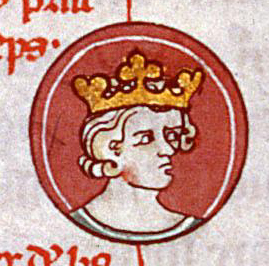
- Robert I as depicted in a 14th century family tree of the Robertians

King of West Francia
- Reign: 29 June 922 – 15 June 923
- Coronation: 29 June 922, Rheims
- Predecessor: Charles the Simple
- Successor: Rudolph
- Born: c. 866
- Died: 15 June 923 (aged 57); Soissons, France
- Burial: Abbey of Sainte-Colombe, Saint-Denis-lès-Sens
- Spouses: Aelis; Béatrice of Vermandois
- Issue more...: Emma, Queen of West Francia; Hugh the Great
- House: Robertian
- Father: Robert the Strong
- Mother: N. sister of count Adalhelm, or Adelaide of Tours

Robert I (c. 866 – 15 June 923) was the elected King of West Francia from 922 to 923. Before his election to the throne he was Count of Poitiers, Count of Paris and Marquis of Neustria and Orléans. He succeeded the overthrown Carolingian king Charles the Simple, who in 898 had succeeded Robert's brother, king Odo.

== Life ==
Robert was younger son of count Robert the Strong (d. 866), one of the most prominent nobles in the West Frankish Kingdom during the reign of Charles the Bald. Regarding the identity of Robert's mother, and numbers of marriages of his father, several solutions have been proposed in scholarly literature. Chronicler Regino of Prüm (d. 915) stated that count Adalhelm was maternal uncle (Latin: avunculus) of Roberts's brother Odo, meaning that Odo's mother (and thus maybe Roberts's too) was sister of Adalhelm, but some alternative genealogical solutions have been also suggested by scholars.

On the other side, several researchers have proposed that Odo's and Roberts's father was during the last years of his life married to Adelaide of Tours, but those suggestions are not universally acknowledged in scholarly literature, since it was shown that they were initially based on some late textual additions and misunderstandings in the Chronicle of St-Bénigne.

Roberts's brother Odo became Count of Paris in 882, and was elected king of West Francia in 888. In time West Francia evolved into the Kingdom of France; and under Odo, the royal capital was fixed in Paris. Robert and Odo came from the Robertian dynasty out of which the Capetian dynasty grew.

In 885 Robert participated in the defence of Paris during the Viking siege of Paris. He was appointed by Odo as the ruler of several counties, including the county of Paris, and abbot in commendam of many abbeys. Robert also secured the office of Dux Francorum, a military dignity of high importance.

He did not claim the crown of West Francia when his brother died in 898; instead recognizing the supremacy of the Carolingian king, Charles the Simple. Charles then confirmed Robert in his offices and possessions, after which he continued to defend northern Francia from the attacks of Vikings. Robert defeated a large band of Vikings in the Loire Valley in 921, after which the defeated invaders converted to Christianity and settled near Nantes.

== King ==
The peace between King Charles the Simple and his powerful vassal was not seriously disturbed until about 921 when Charles' favoritism towards Hagano aroused rebellion. Supported by many of the clergy and by some of the most powerful of the Frankish nobles, Robert took up arms, drove Charles into Lotharingia, and was himself crowned king of the Franks (rex Francorum) at Rheims on 29 June 922.

Robert's rule was contested by the Viking leader Rollo, who had settled in the Duchy of Normandy in 911 with the permission of Charles the Simple. During Robert's reign, Rollo remained loyal to Charles, who continued to contest his deposition. Gathering an army, Charles marched against Robert, and on 15 June 923 at the Battle of Soissons Robert was killed. However, his army won the battle and Charles was captured. Charles remained a captive until his death in 929. Robert was succeeded as king by his son-in-law, Rudolph.

== Family ==
Robert's first wife was Aelis. They had:

- Adela (name uncertain, sometimes also Adelaide or Adelais), married Herbert II, Count of Vermandois
- Emma of France, married to Rudolph, Duke of Burgundy

Robert married for the second time c. 890 to Beatrice of Vermandois, daughter of Herbert I, Count of Vermandois. Together they had:

- Hugh the Great, who was later dux Francorum. Hugh was the father of King Hugh Capet.

== Sources ==
- Bautier, Robert-Henri (1985). "Anne de Kiev, Reine de France, et la Politique Royale au XI e Siecle: Étude critique de la documentation". Revue des études slaves. 57 (4). Institut d'études slaves: 539–564. doi:10.3406/slave.1985.5520.
- Berkhofer, Robert F. (2004). Day of Reckoning: Power and Accountability in Medieval France. University of Pennsylvania Press.
- Bouchard, Constance B. (1981). "The Origins of the French Nobility: A Reassessment". The American Historical Review. 86 (3): 501–532.
- Bradbury, Jim (2007). The Capetians: Kings of France, 987-1328. London: Continuum Books.
- Collins, Roger (1999). Early Medieval Europe, 300–1000 (2 ed.). St. Martin's Press.
- Fanning, Steven; Bachrach, Bernard S., eds. (2011). The Annals of Flodoard of Reims, 916–966. University of Toronto Press.
- Jackman, Donald C. (2008). Comparative Accuracy. State College, PA: Editions Endlaplage.
- Jones, Colin (2005). The Cambridge Illustrated History of France. Cambridge University Press.
- Kurze, Fridericus, ed. (1890). Reginonis abbatis Prumiensis Chronicon cum continuatione Treverensi. Hannoverae: Impensis Bibliopolii Hahniani.
- MacLean, Simon (2003). Kingship and Politics in the Late Ninth Century: Charles the Fat and the end of the Carolingian Empire. New York: Cambridge University Press.
- MacLean, Simon (2009). History and Politics in Late Carolingian and Ottonian Europe: The Chronicle of Regino of Prüm and Adalbert of Magdeburg. Manchester and New York: Manchester University Press.
- Nelson, Janet L. (1991). The Annals of St-Bertin. Manchester: Manchester University Press.
- Nelson, Janet L. (1992). Charles the Bald. London and New York: Longman.
- Nelson, Janet L. (1996). The Frankish World, 750-900. London: The Hambledon Press.
- Riché, Pierre (1993). The Carolingians: A Family Who Forged Europe. Philadelphia: University of Pennsylvania Press.

Preceded by Charles the Simple	King of West Francia; 922–923	Succeeded by Rudolph
