= 934 =

Calendar year

934 in various calendars
- Gregorian calendar: 934; CMXXXIV
- Ab urbe condita: 1687
- Armenian calendar: 383; ԹՎ ՅՁԳ
- Assyrian calendar: 5684
- Balinese saka calendar: 855–856
- Bengali calendar: 340–341
- Berber calendar: 1884
- Buddhist calendar: 1478
- Burmese calendar: 296
- Byzantine calendar: 6442–6443
- Chinese calendar: 癸巳年 (Water Snake); 3631 or 3424 — to — 甲午年 (Wood Horse); 3632 or 3425
- Coptic calendar: 650–651
- Discordian calendar: 2100
- Ethiopian calendar: 926–927
- Hebrew calendar: 4694–4695
- Hindu calendars
- Vikram Samvat: 990–991
- Shaka Samvat: 855–856
- Kali Yuga: 4034–4035
- Holocene calendar: 10934
- Iranian calendar: 312–313
- Islamic calendar: 322–323
- Japanese calendar: Jōhei 4 (承平４年)
- Javanese calendar: 833–834
- Julian calendar: 934; CMXXXIV
- Korean calendar: 3267
- Minguo calendar: 978 before ROC 民前978年
- Nanakshahi calendar: −534
- Seleucid era: 1245/1246 AG
- Thai solar calendar: 1476–1477
- Tibetan calendar: ཆུ་མོ་སྦྲུལ་ལོ་ (female Water-Snake); 1060 or 679 or −93 — to — ཤིང་ཕོ་རྟ་ལོ་ (male Wood-Horse); 1061 or 680 or −92

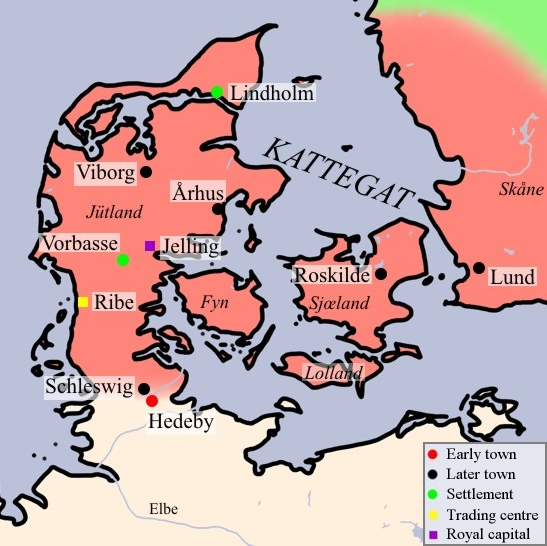
Map of Viking Denmark with Hedeby.

Year 934 (CMXXXIV) was a common year starting on Wednesday of the Julian calendar.

== Events ==
=== By place ===
==== Byzantine Empire ====
- Spring and Summer – The Hungarians make an alliance with the Pechenegs, and fight their way through Thrace to Constantinople.
- Battle of W.l.n.d.r: The Hungarians and Pechenegs kill Constantinople's inhabitants, inflict severe damage on the countryside, and defeat both the Byzantine Empire and Bulgaria, forcing them to pay tribute. Emperor Romanos I signs a peace treaty with the Hungarians.

==== Europe ====
- King Henry I ("the Fowler") pacifies the territories to the north, where the Danish Vikings have been harrying the Frisians by sea. He defeats the Danes petty King Gnupa, and conquers Hedeby.
- Summer – Caliph Abd-al-Rahman III invades Navarra and forces Queen Toda to submit to him. Her son the 15-year-old King García Sánchez I becomes a vassal of the Caliphate of Córdoba.
- Haakon I ("the Good"), a son of the late King Harald Fairhair, once again reunites the kingdom after he has deposed his half-brother Eric Bloodaxe. Haakon is installed as king of Norway.
- The Eldgjá volcanic eruption is the largest basalt flood in history (first documented).

==== England ====
- King Tewdwr of Brycheiniog attends the court of King Æthelstan and signs the English Land Charters. Kings Hywel Dda of Deheubarth, Idwal Foel of Gwynedd and Morgan Mwynfawr ("the Old") of Morgannwg are compelled to accompany Æthelstan on his campaign against King Constantine II of Scotland.

==== Abbasid Caliphate ====
- April 24 – Abbasid caliph al-Qahir is deposed and blinded; he is succeeded by his nephew ar-Radi.
- Summer – Ali ibn Buya, a Samanid governor, takes advantage of the anarchy in Persia and conquers Fars (modern Iran). He founds the Buyid Dynasty, and makes Shiraz his capital. Ali seeks the recognition of the Abbasid caliph Ar-Radi, who confirms him later as his viceroy.

==== Asia ====
- March 16 – Meng Zhixiang, a military governor (jiedushi), declares himself emperor (formally called "Gaozu") and establishes Later Shu as a new Chinese state, independent of Later Tang. He dies after a short-lived five-month reign and is succeeded by his son Meng Chang.
- Goryeo forces push the army of Hubaekje back into its heartland and defeat them finally at Hongseong (modern South Korea).

=== By topic ===
==== Religion ====
- Einsiedeln Abbey, a Benedictine monastery, is founded (modern Switzerland).

== Births ==
- Dong Yuan, Chinese painter (approximate date)
- Wolfgang, bishop of Regensburg (approximate date)

== Deaths ==
- March 4 – Abdullah al-Mahdi Billah, Fatimid caliph (b. 873)
- May 9 – Wang Sitong, Chinese general and governor (b. 892)
- May 14
  - Feng Yun, Chinese chancellor (approximate date)
  - Zhu Hongzhao, Chinese general and governor
- May 16 – Meng Hanqiong, eunuch official of Later Tang
- September 7 – Meng Zhixiang, Chinese general (b. 874)
- November 1 – Beornstan, bishop of Winchester
- November 2 – Emma, queen of the West Frankish Kingdom
- Abu Zayd al-Balkhi, Abbasid mathematician and physician
- Gervadius, Irish hermit and saint (approximate date)
- Gofraid ua Ímair, Viking leader and king of Dublin
- Li Conghou, emperor of Later Tang (b. 914)
- Li Renhan, Chinese general and governor
- Melias, Byzantine general (strategos)
- Olaf Haraldsson, son of Harald Fairhair
- Sale Ngahkwe, king of Pagan (Burma)
- Uallach ingen Muinecháin, Irish poet
- Xu Zhixun, general of Wu (Ten Kingdoms)
- Xue Wenjie, official of Min (Ten Kingdoms)
