= Consort Dowager Wang =

Chinese politician and concubine (died 947)

Consort Dowager Wang (died June 23, 947), who has another title Wang Taifei (王太妃), known commonly by her imperial consort title Shufei (王淑妃), nicknamed Huajianxiu (花見羞, "flowers would be ashamed to see her"), was a noble consort to Li Siyuan (Emperor Mingzong), the second emperor of the Chinese Five Dynasties and Ten Kingdoms period Later Tang state. During Li Siyuan's reign, she, as his favorite concubine, exerted substantial influence within his administration. After the destruction of both Later Tang and its successor state Later Jin (by the Khitan Liao dynasty), her adoptive son Li Congyi was forced to claim imperial title by the evacuating Liao forces, and both she and he were subsequently killed by the succeeding Later Han's founding emperor Liu Zhiyuan.

== Background ==
It is not known when Lady Wang was born. She was a daughter in a household from Bin Prefecture (邠州, in modern Xianyang, Shaanxi) that made cakes. Because of her great beauty, she gained the nickname of "Huajianxiu" (花見羞, "flowers would be ashamed to see her"). She was, in her youth, sold as a servant girl to the Later Liang general Liu Xun. Liu apparently favored her greatly, as he gave her a large amount of money. After Liu's death in 921, she did not marry, and was apparently living off savings that Liu left her.

== During Later Tang ==
=== During Li Cunxu's reign ===
Sometime during the reign of Li Cunxu, the founding emperor of Later Liang's successor state Later Tang, Li Cunxu's adoptive brother and major general Li Siyuan was looking for an additional concubine after his concubine or co-wife Lady Xia died. Someone informed Li Siyuan's close associate An Chonghui about Lady Wang, and An in turn suggested Li Siyuan to take her as a concubine, and Li Siyuan did. As she still had a large amount of money left from what Liu Xun left her, she awarded much of it to Li Siyuan's associates and daughters-in-law, such that throughout the household, everyone praised her. Li Siyuan's wife Lady Cao favored the simple life and did not contend for his favor, and therefore Lady Wang became his favorite.

=== During Li Siyuan's reign ===
Li Cunxu was killed in a mutiny at the state capital Luoyang in 926. Li Siyuan subsequently claimed imperial title. In 928, he created Lady Cao, who was then carrying the title of Lady of Chu, the imperial consort title of Shufei (淑妃), and created Lady Wang, who was then carrying the title of Lady of Han, the lesser (although still high-ranked) title of Defei (德妃). She was apparently childless, and Li Siyuan had her raise his youngest son Li Congyi (later created the Prince of Xu) and a daughter (later created Princess Yong'an) as their mother.

By 928, Consort Wang was apparently already sufficiently powerful inside the palace that, when Li Siyuan's chief of staff Kong Xun wanted to have his daughter married to one of the emperor's sons, it was Consort Wang that he ingratiated. She subsequently suggested to Li Siyuan that his son (by the deceased Lady Xia) Li Conghou marry Kong's daughter, and Li Siyuan agreed.

In 930, Li Siyuan was prepared to create Consort Cao empress. She stated to Consort Wang, "I have always despised minute matters, and I do not want to be involved in ceremonies. You, sister, should substitute for me." Consort Wang responded, "The Central Palace [(i.e., the empress's palace, and therefore an alternate way to refer to the empress)] matches the Supreme One [(i.e., the emperor)]. Who would dare to step in?" Li Siyuan subsequently created Consort Cao empress, and later promoted Consort Wang to the rank of Shufei. Consort Wang served both Li Siyuan and Empress Cao carefully, such that Empress Cao and Consort Wang became very close. However, it was said that because of this, Consort Wang effectively controlled what occurred in the palace. She lived luxuriously (by that period's standard), using silk to make her skirts. An Chonghui tried to curb her luxurious living by comparing her lifestyle to the terrible fate that Li Cunxu's wife Empress Liu suffered. She thereafter began to dislike An. Both she and the eunuch Meng Hanqiong were therefore repeatedly speaking against An.

Later in 930, there was a time when An wanted to try to harm Li Siyuan's adoptive son Li Congke, who was then the military governor (Jiedushi) of Huguo Circuit (護國, headquartered in modern Yuncheng, Shanxi), against whom he had a previous grudge. He thus induced Li Congke's officer Yang Yanwen (楊彥溫) into a mutiny against Li Congke, and subsequently tried to use the mutiny to get Li Siyuan to kill or otherwise severely punish Li Congke. It was said that it was due to Consort Wang's speaking on his behalf that Li Congke was spared.

In 931, Consort Wang received the greater title of Shufei. Later in the year, believing the accusations by the general Zhu Hongzhao that An was plotting rebellion, Li Siyuan had An put to death. After An's death, she and Meng had an even firmer hold on the palace scene, although it was said that Li Siyuan's oldest surviving son (by Lady Xia), Li Congrong the Prince of Qin, paid them—or, for that matter, any governmental official—no heed. It became so worrisome for his chiefs of staff Fan Yanguang and Zhao Yanshou that both sought to leave the imperial court to become military governors (jiedushi)— requests that Li Siyuan considered insulting as he believed that they were abandoning him. Zhao was allowed to leave first through the influence of his wife, Li Siyuan's daughter the Princess of Qi (to become the military governor of Xuanwu Circuit (宣武, headquartered in modern Kaifeng, Henan)). Fan was subsequently able to leave as well, by persuade Consort Wang and Meng to speak on his behalf (to become the military governor of Chengde Circuit (成德, headquartered in modern Shijiazhuang, Hebei)). Still remembering how Liu Xun treated her well, she made sure that Liu's sons were given governmental positions.

Shortly thereafter, with Li Siyuan extremely ill and apparently near death, Li Congrong tried to seize power, but was defeated by the palace guards and killed. It was said that Consort Wang and Meng participated in the actions taken against Li Congrong. When Li Siyuan himself died shortly after, Li Conghou succeeded to the throne.

=== During Li Conghou's and Li Congke's reigns ===
After Li Conghou took the throne, he honored Empress Cao as empress dowager. Shortly thereafter, there was a conversation between the wife of one of the imperial guard generals who battled Li Congrong's forces, Zhu Hongshi (朱洪實), and Li Congyi's wet nurse Lady Wang—who had also had been carrying on an affair with Li Congrong. In the conversation, Lady Wang tried to defend Li Congrong's actions and pointed out that Li Congrong had previously treated Zhu well. When Zhu heard this, he, in fear, reported this, as well as Lady Wang's affair with Li Congrong, to Li Conghou. Li Conghou thereafter forced Lady Wang to commit suicide. Because of Lady Wang's status as Li Congyi's wet nurse and because Consort Wang had treated Li Congrong well, Li Conghou began to suspect her. He considered moving her out of the main palace into a subsidiary palace, Zhide Palace (至德宮), but because of the close relationship between Empress Dowager Cao and Consort Wang, he worried that this would be hurtful to the empress dowager, and therefore did not do so, but he also did not treat her with great respect. However, he did, in early 934, honored her as consort dowager.

Shortly after, Zhu Hongzhao and Feng Yun, who were then serving as Li Conghou's chiefs of staff (shumishi), apprehensive of the powers that Empress Dowager Cao's son-in-law Shi Jingtang (who was then the military governor (Jiedushi) of Hedong Circuit (河東, headquartered in modern Taiyuan, Shanxi)) and Li Congke (who was then the military governor of Fengxiang Circuit (鳳翔, headquartered in modern Baoji, Shaanxi)) had (as Shi and Li Congke had both been long-time generals under Li Siyuan and were respected by the army), decided to move them to prevent them from being entrenched. They also wanted to summon their ally Meng Hanqiong, who was then temporarily overseeing the governance of Tianxiong Circuit (天雄, headquartered in modern Handan, Hebei), back to Luoyang. They therefore issued a series of orders (without an imperial edict) transferring Li Congke to Hedong, Shi to Chengde, and Fan Yanguang to Tianxiong. However, at that time, many generals who were transferred met ill fates, and Li Congke feared that these actions were intended against him. He thus rebelled, and the army that Li Conghou sent against him, under command of the general Wang Sitong, turned against Wang and surrendered to Li Congke. Li Congke marched on Luoyang, and Li Conghou fled the capital. In the emperor's absence, the officials turned to Empress Dowager Cao, who subsequently issued edicts deposing Li Conghou and declaring Li Congke regent, and then emperor. Li Conghou was subsequently killed in flight—as Shi, who was initially intending to support him against Li Congke, also turned against him when he saw how little support Li Conghou had by that point, killed all of his remaining guards and leaving him unable to fend for himself when Li Congke subsequently sent emissaries to kill him. Empress Dowager Cao continued to be empress dowager, and Consort Dowager Wang continued to be consort dowager, but her ally Meng, whom Li Congke believed to be part of the plot against him, was executed.

After Li Congke became emperor, there was a time when he held a feast at Consort Dowager Wang's residence. During the feast, she offered to take tonsure to be a Buddhist nun—shocking Li Congke, who asked her the reason. She wept and explained stated that she did not know what would happen to Li Congyi. (As Li Siyuan's only surviving biological son—as Li Congke was adopted into the household because his mother Lady Wei and he were seized by Li Siyuan on a campaign, and Lady Wei subsequently became a wife or concubine to Li Siyuan—she might have feared that conspiracies might arise to make him emperor.) She stated, "My young son may have something happen to him. If his older brother will not tolerate him, how will I ever be able to see the deceased Emperor after death?" Li Congke was also saddened, and he treated her well.

In 936, Shi, after Li Congke issued an edict transferring him to Tianping Circuit (天平, headquartered in modern Tai'an, Shandong), rebelled, and, allying with the Khitan Empire's Emperor Taizong, defeated the Later Tang troops that Li Congke sent against him. He then marched toward Luoyang. Believing that defeat was inevitable, Li Congke gathered his family members, including Empress Dowager Cao, and a group of officers still loyal to him, to commit suicide by fire. Consort Dowager Wang tried to persuade Empress Dowager Cao not to participate in the mass suicide—noting to her that Shi was her son-in-law. Empress Dowager Cao rejected her overture, stating:

My son, grandson, daughter-in-law, and granddaughters, have reached this point. How do I have the heart to live by myself? You, sister, protect yourself.

Consort Dowager Wang thus took Li Congyi and Princess Yong'an, hid at a polo field, and did not participate in the mass suicide, but Empress Dowager Cao joined and died in the mass suicide. Shi, whom Emperor Taizong had declared the emperor of a new Later Jin, arrived at Luoyang shortly thereafter and took over the realm.

== During Later Jin ==
After the establishment of the Later Jin court, Consort Dowager Wang again requested to become a Buddhist nun. Shi Jingtang did not agree, and moved her to Zhide Palace. After Shi moved the capital from Luoyang to Kaifeng in 937, Consort Dowager Wang and Li Congyi were also moved to Kaifeng and took up residence in the palace, with Shi Jingtang's wife Empress Li (Li Siyuan's and Empress Cao's daughter) personally overseeing Li Congyi's upbringing and treating Consort Dowager Wang like a mother. In 939, Shi also created Li Congyi the Duke of Xun and put him in charge of sacrificing to five emperors of Tang dynasty (which Later Tang claimed to be legitimate successor to) and Later Tang.

Shi Jingtang died in 942, and was succeeded as emperor by his nephew and adopted son Shi Chonggui. After Shi Chonggui's succession, Consort Dowager Wang and Li Congyi returned to Luoyang and took up residence there.

In contrast to Shi Jingtang's view of Khitan's Emperor Taizong (who had changed the name of his state to Liao by this point) as a benefactor—going as far as referring to himself as "Son Emperor" and "subject" while honoring Emperor Taizong as "Father Emperor"—Shi Chonggui, at the advice of the general Jing Yanguang, took a confrontational stance against the Khitan, initially only referring to himself as "grandson" and not as subject, and eventually went as far as closing the Liao trade office, seizing its assets, and killing Khitan merchants. This led to repeated Liao incursions. In 946, Shi Chonggui launched a punitive expedition, commanded by the generals Du Wei (the husband of one of Shi JIngtang's sisters) and Li Shouzhen, but Emperor Taizong defeated and then induced Du and Li Shouzhen to surrender to him. He then attacked south. With nearly the entire Later Jin army given to Du and Li Shouzhen for the expedition, Kaifeng was defenseless, and Shi Chonggui surrendered, ending Later Jin.

== After Later Jin's destruction ==
After Emperor Taizong entered Kaifeng, he claimed to be the emperor of China (i.e., the former Later Jin realm) as well. Meanwhile, the wife of Zhao Yanshou (who had served Liao ever since his capture by Emperor Taizong in the campaign of Later Tang's destruction) had died by this point, and Emperor Taizong thus wanted to give Princess Yong'an to Zhao in marriage as his next wife. As her mother, Consort Dowager Wang went to Kaifeng for the ceremony. When Emperor Taizong saw her, he, claiming that he and Li Siyuan had previously agreed to be blood brothers, bowed to her, greeting her as a sister-in-law. Meanwhile, Liu Xun's son Liu Suining (劉遂凝) asked her to intercede for him to ask for a military governorship, and she did. Emperor Taizong thus commissioned Liu Suining as the military governor of Anyuan Circuit (安遠, headquartered in modern Xiaogan, Hubei). He also commissioned Li Congyi as the military governor of Weixin Circuit (威信, headquartered in modern Heze, Shandong) and created Li Congyi the Prince of Xu. Believing that Li Congyi was still too young, Consort Dowager Wang declined the opportunity to have him report to the post, and took him back to Luoyang.

Emperor Taizong, despite his desire to rule over the former Later Jin realms, treated it poorly, allowing his soldiers to pillage the realm. This led to many armed rebellions against him, and he, troubled by the situation, decided to head back to Khitan territory, leaving his brother-in-law Xiao Han in charge at Kaifeng. He became ill on the way, and died near Heng Prefecture (恆州, in modern Shijiazhuang), plunging the succession into a battle between his nephew Yelü Ruan (supported by the army that attacked south, and who then declared himself emperor, as Emperor Shizong) and his brother Yelü Lihu (supported by his mother Empress Dowager Shulü). Xiao wanted to abandon Kaifeng himself, particularly with one of the rebellion leaders, the Later Jin general Liu Zhiyuan (who had declared himself the emperor of a new Later Han) bearing down toward Luoyang and Kaifeng, but feared that, with Han rebellions already overtaken the realm, if he simply abandoned Kaifeng, he might be caught in such a disturbance that he could not withdraw safely. He sent the officer Gao Mohan (高謨翰) to Luoyang under the name of the deceased Emperor Taizong, summoning Consort Dowager Wang and Li Congyi to Kaifeng. Consort Dowager Wang and Li Congyi tried to hide themselves at Li Siyuan's tomb, but were discovered by Gao and his soldiers and forced to report to Kaifeng. Once there, Xiao declared Li Congyi emperor and, after leaving some of the soldiers from Lulong Circuit (盧龍, headquartered in modern Beijing, ceded by Shi Jingtang to Liao in appreciation of its support of him) to help defend Kaifeng, departed.

Consort Dowager Wang realized that this left her and Li Congyi in a disastrous position, and when the officials left at Kaifeng greeted her, she wept and stated,

"We, mother and son, are left in such a vulnerable position, but you, lords, pushed us to this position; this will bring disaster on our household!"

She tried to firm up Kaifeng's defenses by summoning Gao Xingzhou the military governor of Guide Circuit (歸德, headquartered in modern Shangqiu, Henan) and Wu Xingde (武行德) the military governor of Heyang Circuit (河陽, headquartered in modern Jiaozuo, Henan), but neither paid her any heed. She, in fear, stated to the officials,

"We, mother and son, had been forced by Xiao Han into destruction. But you, lords, are sinless. You should quickly welcome the new emperor to seek your own fortune. Do not worry about us!"

The officials were touched by her, and none left. When she subsequently consulted them, some advocated resisting Liu, arguing that if they could hold out for a month, Liao would send reinforcements. Consort Dowager Wang, however, believed that resistance would be useless and that a siege would be disastrous to the people of Kaifeng, and therefore resolved to surrender. She thus had Li Congyi, using the lesser title of Prince of Liang, submit a petition welcoming Liu to Kaifeng, and they moved out of the palace into a private residence.

This overture, however, could not save her or Li Congyi. Liu subsequently entered Luoyang and, receiving the petition, sent his officer Guo Congyi (郭從義) to Kaifeng with instructions to kill Consort Dowager Wang and Li Congyi. As Consort Dowager Wang was facing death, she wept and stated, "My son was put into this position by the Khitan. What crime did he have to deserve death? Why not allow him to live, such that each year, at Cold Food Festival, he could sacrifice a bowl of wheat grains to the tomb of Emperor Mingzong?" It was said that whoever heard of what she said were touched to weep for her fate.

== Notes and references ==
- New History of the Five Dynasties, vol. 15.
- Zizhi Tongjian, vols. 276, 277, 278, 279, 280, 282, 286, 287.
