= Empress Cao (Li Siyuan's wife) =

Empress Cao (曹皇后, personal name unknown) (died January 11, 937), formally Empress Hewuxian (和武憲皇后), was an empress of the Chinese Five Dynasties and Ten Kingdoms Period state Later Tang. Her husband was Later Tang's second emperor Li Siyuan (Emperor Mingzong), and she was empress dowager during the subsequent reigns of his son Li Conghou (Emperor Min) and adoptive son Li Congke. Eventually, when her son-in-law Shi Jingtang rebelled against Li Congke, establishing his own Later Jin and attacked the Later Tang capital Luoyang, she died in a mass suicide with Li Congke, his family, and some officers.

== Background ==
It is not known when the future Empress Cao was born — indeed, virtually nothing was known about her background even by the time of the next succeeding united Chinese dynasty, Song Dynasty, as the Song author of the New History of the Five Dynasties, Ouyang Xiu, indicated. It is further unclear how she became the wife — or one of multiple wives — of Li Siyuan's, or whether two other wives or concubines of his, Lady Xia (the mother of his sons Li Congrong and Li Conghou) and Lady Wei (the mother of his adoptive son Li Congke, who was fathered by Lady Wei's original husband, named Wang), were considered of coequal status with her or not. It appeared that she had no son, but had at least one daughter, the future Princess of Wei, then of Jin, who married Li Siyuan's subordinate officer Shi Jingtang. Sometime during the reign of Li Siyuan's adoptive brother and predecessor Li Cunxu, Lady Cao, as Li Siyuan's wife, was created the Lady of Chu. After Lady Xia's death, Li Siyuan also took a Lady Wang as a concubine, and Lady Wang became his favorite, as Lady Cao was described to favor the simple life.

== As imperial consort and empress ==
Li Cunxu was killed in a mutiny at the capital Luoyang in 926, and Li Siyuan subsequently claimed imperial title. Either that year (as stated by the New History of the Five Dynasties) or later, in 928 (as stated in the annals of Li Siyuan's reign in the History of the Five Dynasties, which otherwise lacked biographical information for her in its biographies for Later Tang empresses), she was given the imperial consort title Shufei (淑妃). (According to the History of the Five Dynasties, Lady Wang, who then carried the title of the Lady of Han, was given the lesser consort title of Defei (德妃) at the same time.)

In 930, Li Siyuan was preparing to create Consort Cao empress. She stated to Consort Wang, "I have always despised minute matters, and I do not want to be involved in ceremonies. You, sister, should substitute for me." Consort Wang responded, "The Central Palace [(i.e., the empress's palace, and therefore an alternate way to refer to the empress)] matches the Supreme One [(i.e., the emperor)]. Who would dare to step in?" Li Siyuan subsequently created Consort Cao empress, and later promoted Consort Wang to the rank of Shufei. Consort Wang served both Li Siyuan and Empress Cao carefully, such that Empress Cao and Consort Wang became very close. However, it was said that because of this, Consort Wang effectively controlled what occurred in the palace.

== As empress dowager ==
=== During Li Conghou's reign ===
Li Siyuan died in late 933, and his second son by Lady Xia, Li Conghou the Prince of Song, succeeded him as emperor. (Lady Xia's older son Li Congrong the Prince of Qin, who had previously been considered the likely heir, had tried to seize power in Li Siyuan's illness, but was killed by the imperial guards.) In 934, Li Conghou honored Empress Cao as empress dowager.

Shortly after, Li Conghou's chiefs of staff (shumishi) Zhu Hongzhao and Feng Yun, apprehensive of the powers that Shi Jingtang (who was then the military governor (Jiedushi) of Hedong Circuit (河東, headquartered in modern Taiyuan, Shanxi)) and Li Congke (who was then the military governor of Fengxiang Circuit (鳳翔, headquartered in modern Baoji, Shaanxi)) had (as Shi and Li Congke had both been long-time generals under Li Siyuan and were respected by the army), decided to move them to prevent them from being entrenched. They also wanted to summon their ally, the eunuch Meng Hanqiong, who was then temporarily overseeing the governance of Tianxiong Circuit (天雄, headquartered in modern Handan, Hebei), back to Luoyang. They therefore issued a series of orders (without an imperial edict) transferring Li Congke to Hedong, Shi to Chengde Circuit (成德, headquartered in modern Shijiazhuang, Hebei), and Chengde's military governor Fan Yanguang to Tianxiong. However, at that time, many generals who were transferred met ill fates, and Li Congke feared that these actions were intended against him. He thus rebelled, and the army that Li Conghou sent against him, under command of the general Wang Sitong, turned against Wang and surrendered to Li Congke. Li Congke marched on Luoyang, and Li Conghou fled the capital. In the emperor's absence, the officials turned to Empress Dowager Cao, who subsequently issued edicts deposing Li Conghou and declaring Li Congke regent, and then emperor. Li Conghou was subsequently killed in flight — as Shi, who was initially intending to support him against Li Congke, also turned against him when he saw how little support Li Conghou had by that point, killed all of his remaining guards and leaving him unable to fend for himself when Li Congke subsequently sent emissaries to kill him. Empress Dowager Cao continued to be empress dowager.

=== During Li Congke's reign ===
After what had occurred, Shi Jingtang remained at Luoyang for some time and did not dare to speak of returning to Hedong, because there had a long-time rivalry previously between Li Congke and Shi when both were serving under Li Siyuan, and because Li Congke knew that Shi had initially intended to support Li Conghou. However, both Empress Dowager Cao and Shi Jingtang's wife the Princess of Wei often spoke in defense of Shi. Li Congke's associates who came to Luoyang with him from Fengxiang mostly advocated keeping Shi at Luoyang, but the imperial scholars Han Zhaoyin and Li Zhuanmei (李專美) both advocated sending Shi back to Hedong, believing that if Li Congke did not do so, both Zhao Yanshou (who had also married a sister of Li Congke's and who was then serving as the military governor of Xuanwu Circuit (宣武, headquartered in modern Kaifeng, Henan)) and Zhao's adoptive father Zhao Dejun the military governor of Lulong Circuit (盧龍, headquartered in modern Beijing) would be fearful that they would be targeted next. Li Congke thus allowed Shi to return to Hedong. Subsequently, Shi used the daughter-mother relationship between his wife (who had then been created the Grand Princess of Jin) and Empress Dowager Cao to bribe Empress Dowager Cao's attendants to spy on the events of Li Congke's court.

Li Congke also intensely disliked his cousins Li Congzhang (李從璋) the Prince of Yang and Li Congmin (李從敏) the Prince of Jing, for their brashness and corruption, and particularly because Li Congmin had participated in the killing of Li Congke's son Li Chongji (李重吉) (at Li Conghou's order, during Li Congke's rebellion against Li Conghou), and so had them removed from their military governor posts and had them reside at Luoyang. In 934, at a feast that Li Congke held for the imperial clan, in the middle of the feast, Li Congke suddenly turned to Li Congzhang and Li Congmin, stating to them, "What kind of things are you two, that you get to occupy important circuits repeatedly?" They became very fearful. Empress Dowager Cao, apparently to save them, stated to them, "The Emperor is drunk. Leave now!"

In 936, Shi, after Li Congke issued an edict transferring him to Tianping Circuit (天平, headquartered in modern Tai'an, Shandong), rebelled, and, allying with the Khitan Empire's Emperor Taizong, defeated the Later Tang troops that Li Congke sent against him. He then marched toward Luoyang. Believing that defeat was inevitable, Li Congke gathered his family members, including Empress Dowager Cao, and a group of officers still loyal to him, to commit suicide by fire. Consort Dowager Wang tried to persuade Empress Dowager Cao not to participate in the mass suicide — noting to her that Shi was her son-in-law. Empress Dowager Cao rejected her overture, stating:

My son, grandson, daughter-in-law, and granddaughters, have reached this point. How do I have the heart to live by myself? You, sister, protect yourself.

Consort Dowager Wang and her adoptive son Li Congyi the Prince of Xu, as well as Li Congyi's younger sister, thus hid at a polo field and did not participate in the mass suicide, but Empress Dowager Cao joined and died in the mass suicide. In 940, Shi gave her a posthumous name and buried her pursuant to the ceremonies due an empress.

== Notes and references ==
- History of the Five Dynasties, vol. 49.
- New History of the Five Dynasties, vol. 15.
- Zizhi Tongjian, vols. 277, 278, 279, 280.

Preceded by Empress Liu	Empress of Later Tang; 930–933	Succeeded by Empress Kong
Preceded by Empress Liu	Empress of China (Most regions); 930–933	Succeeded by Empress Kong
Preceded by Lady Wu of Wuyue	Wife to Sovereign of China (Zhejiang) (de jure); 932–933	Succeeded by Empress Kong
Preceded by Lady Cui of Min	Wife to Sovereign of China (Fujian) (de jure); 930–933	Succeeded by Lady Jin of Min
