= Meng Hanqiong =

Meng Hanqiong (Chinese: 孟漢瓊) (died May 16, 934?), was a eunuch of the Chinese Five Dynasties and Ten Kingdoms Period state Later Tang. He became powerful late in the reign of its second emperor Li Siyuan, in association with Li Siyuan's favorite concubine Consort Wang, and continued to be during the reign of Li Siyuan's son and successor Li Conghou. He was killed by Li Conghou's adoptive brother Li Congke, who overthrew Li Conghou.

== Background ==
It is not known when, or where, Meng Hanqiong was born. It is known that in his youth, he served as a eunuch servant of Wang Rong the Prince of Zhao. It appeared that after Wang Rong was assassinated and succeeded by his adoptive son Zhang Wenli, in 921, and then Zhao territory was eventually conquered and incorporated into Jin by Jin's prince Li Cunxu in 922, Meng remained at Zhao's capital Zhending (真定, in modern Shijiazhuang, Hebei), for he came to serve under Li Cunxu's adoptive brother Li Siyuan when Li Cunxu, by that time carrying the title of emperor of a new Later Tang, was commissioned by Li Cunxu as the military governor of Chengde Circuit (成德, headquartered at Zhending) in 925.

== During Li Siyuan's reign ==
Li Cunxu was killed in a mutiny at the capital Luoyang in 926, and Li Siyuan succeeded him. Meng Hanqiong subsequently served in various capacities in Li Siyuan's palace. In 930, when, at the insistence of Li Siyuan's powerful chief of staff An Chonghui, Li Siyuan's adoptive son Li Congke was removed from his post as the military governor (Jiedushi) of Hezhong Circuit (河中, headquartered in modern Yuncheng, Shanxi), Li Congke was forbidden from seeing the emperor, and An was repeatedly trying to find ways to further accuse Li Congke of crimes. Li Congke, however, was spared through the intercession of Li Siyuan's favorite concubine Consort Wang. She often communicated with Li Congke by sending Meng to see him; Meng therefore considered himself a benefactor to Li Congke.

As of late 930, Meng was serving as director of miscellaneous affairs (武德使, Wudeshi) inside the palace, and both he and Consort Wang were repeatedly accusing An of faults. An, viewing his position as precarious, thus offered to resign. However, when Li Siyuan subsequently sent Meng to consult the chancellors on their opinion on this matter, the results were mixed — Feng Dao believe that it was better for An to resign, while Zhao Feng believed that An should remain chief of staff. As a result, Li Siyuan took no action at that time.

Later in 930, with the imperial forces boggled down in a campaign that An advocated — against the military governors Meng Zhixiang of Xichuan Circuit (西川, headquartered in modern Chengdu, Sichuan) and Dong Zhang of Dongchuan Circuit (東川, headquartered in modern Mianyang, Sichuan) — An departed Luoyang for the front to oversee the campaign. While he was on the way there, though, Zhu Hongzhao the military governor of Fengxiang Circuit (鳳翔, headquartered in modern Baoji, Shaanxi); the commander of the forces against Xichuan and Dongchuan, Li Siyuan's son-in-law Shi Jingtang; as well as Meng Hanqiong (who was carrying the title of the director of palace affairs (宣徽使, Xuanhuishi) at that point), all submitted petitions suggesting that An may be intent on seizing the command of the army. Li Siyuan thus recalled An, then made him the military governor of Hezhong, then ordered him into retirement, and then killed him. (It was not until after An was killed that the restrictions on Li Congke were lifted.)

In 931, Meng Hanqiong was additionally made the acting director of the eunuch bureau (內侍省, Neishi Sheng). It was said that while Fan Yanguang and Zhao Yanshou served as the chiefs of staff, they feared being accused of power-grabbing, just as An had, so they often declined to rule on important matters. The decisions thus often fell into the hands of Consort Wang and Meng. While An was alive, he had put a strict limit on palace expenditures. Now, with Meng being powerful, he often simply had various items retrieved from the government treasury, claiming orders from Li Siyuan's wife Empress Cao, without notifying the office of the chiefs of staff or the three financial agencies (taxation, treasury, and salt and iron monopolies), and without keeping records of them.

However, the one person at the court who was without anyone to control him was Li Siyuan's oldest surviving son Li Congrong the Prince of Qin, who was generally considered the likely heir but who had no respect for any other official or general, including Fan or Zhao. Fan and Zhao, fearing that given their poor relationships with Li Congrong that they would eventually suffer disaster, both sought to leave the chief of staff post and leave Luoyang to serve as military governors. Li Siyuan, however, resisted, believing that they were abandoning him. In winter 932, after Zhao had already been allowed to leave (to serve as the military governor of Xuanwu Circuit (宣武, headquartered in modern Kaifeng, Henan) and was replaced by Zhu, Fan had Consort Wang and Meng speak on his behalf, and was finally allowed to leave Luoyang to serve as the military governor of Chengde. He was replaced by Feng Yun. (Despite Meng's intercession for him, Fan, when leaving Li Siyuan, nevertheless cautioned Li Siyuan against Meng's influence, albeit in veiled terms.)

Not long after, Li Siyuan became deathly ill. Li Congrong became concerned whether the high level officials would divert the succession away from him, and therefore informed Zhu and Feng that he was intending to enter the palace forcibly. When Zhu and Feng sent back messages indicating their opposition, Li Congrong launched his guard corps and approached the palace. Feng, hearing the news, quickly convened a meeting with Zhu, Meng, the imperial guard general Kang Yicheng (康義誠), and the director of the financial agencies Sun Yue (孫岳) to discuss what to do. While Feng advocated resisting Li Congrong, the meeting came to a standstill when Kang was not responding to Feng's arguments. Meng, ignoring Kang, broke up the meeting by stating that he was going to enter the palace to protect the emperor, and then left for the palace; Zhu and Feng followed, and Kang felt compelled to follow as well. Subsequently, under Zhu's and Feng's orders, and with Meng personally summoning the imperial guard general Zhu Hongshi (朱洪實) to command the resistance, the imperial guards resisted and defeated Li Congrong's guards. Li Congrong was killed. Li Siyuan, who had recovered slightly, thereafter resolved to summon another son, Li Conghou the Prince of Song, who was then serving as the military governor of Tianxiong Circuit (天雄, headquartered in modern Handan, Hebei). He sent Meng to Tianxiong to deliver the summons, and also to remain there to temporarily oversee the governance of Tianxiong. Meng did so, but before Li Conghou could arrive at Luoyang, Li Siyuan died. Li Conghou subsequently arrived at Luoyang and succeeded Li Siyuan as emperor.

== During Li Conghou's reign ==
Zhu Hongzhao and Feng Yun remained Li Conghou's chiefs of staff and became the dominant figures in their administration, and they did not trust Li Congke, who was then serving as the military governor of Fengxiang, or Shi Jingtang, who was then serving as the military governor of Hedong Circuit (河東, headquartered in modern Taiyuan, Shanxi), as both Li Congke and Shi had had great accomplishments while serving under Li Siyuan and were respected by the army. In spring 934, because they did not want Shi to remain at Hedong for long, and wanted to recall Meng from Tianxiong, they issued a number of transfer orders as chiefs of staff — transferring Li Congke from Fengxiang to Hedong, Shi from Hedong to Chengde, and Fan Yanguang from Chengde to Tianxiong, and recalling Meng from Tianxiong.

Li Congke, believing that these orders were targeted against him, rebelled. Initially, the imperial forces sent against Li Congke, commanded by the general Wang Sitong, were victorious, and quickly put Fengxiang's capital Fengxiang Municipality under siege. However, when his officer Yang Siquan (楊思權) defected to Li Congke, the imperial army lost its morale and collapsed, largely surrendering to Li Congke. Li Congke took the army and headed for Luoyang. Li Conghou sent Kang against Li Congke, but Kang also surrendered to Li Congke, leaving Luoyang defenseless at that point.

Li Conghou wanted to flee to Tianxiong, and ordered Meng to go to Tianxiong to first prepare for his arrival. Meng, however, had already decided not to keep his allegiance to Li Conghou by this point and, upon receiving the order, left Luoyang, but did not head for Tianxiong; instead, he headed toward Li Congke's army, then having reached Shan Prefecture (陝州, in modern Sanmenxia, Henan), to submit to Li Congke, believing that his old relationship with Li Congke would lead to his being spared. When he rendezvoused with Li Congke just west of Mianchi (澠池, in modern Sanmenxia), he cried bitterly and tried to speak in his own defense. Li Congke responded, "You need not speak. I already know." Believing that Li Congke had forgiven him, he inserted himself into the procession of the officials following Li Congke's march. Seeing this, Li Congke ordered that he be beheaded by the side of the road.

== Notes and references ==
- History of the Five Dynasties, vol. 72.
- Zizhi Tongjian, vols. 277, 278, 279.
