= Li Congrong =

Li Congrong (Chinese: 李從榮) (died December 9, 933), formally the Prince of Qin (秦王), was a son of Li Siyuan, the second emperor of the Chinese Five Dynasties and Ten Kingdoms period state Later Tang. During Li Siyuan's reign, he, as Li Siyuan's oldest surviving biological son, was commonly expected to be Li Siyuan's heir. When his father became deathly ill, however, he, worried that his father's officials might try to divert succession away from him, tried to seize power by force, but was then defeated and killed.

== Background ==
It is not known when Li Congrong was born—although it would have been in or before 914, when his younger brother, Li Conghou, born of the same mother, was born. It is further unclear what status their mother Lady Xia had vis-a-vis his father Li Siyuan—while Lady Cao was traditionally regarded to be his wife on account of her later serving as empress, Lady Xia was not clearly stated as a prior wife, a co-wife, or a concubine, although it was known that she died prior to Li Siyuan's becoming emperor (during the early Tongguang era (923–926) of his predecessor and adoptive brother Li Cunxu) without having been created a title while alive, while Lady Cao was apparently created the Lady of Chu by Li Cunxu. What is known is that Li Congrong was Li Siyuan's second son, and Li Conghou his third. In their young age, both Li Congrong and Li Conghou had good relationships with Li Siyuan's close associate An Chonghui, who was effectively an older brotherly figure to them. As Li Congrong's older brother Li Congjing (李從璟, né Li Congshen (李從審)) was killed by Li Cunxu's general Li Shaorong near the end of Li Cunxu's reign (after Li Siyuan was effectively forced into rebelling against Li Cunxu, and Li Shaorong thus found Li Congjing to be unreliable as an imperial guard), Li Congrong was effectively Li Siyuan's oldest son after that point.

== During Li Siyuan's early reign ==
In 926, Li Cunxu was killed in a mutiny at the Later Tang capital Luoyang. Li Siyuan subsequently arrived at Luoyang and claimed rightful succession as emperor. Late in the year, he commissioned Li Congrong the military governor (jiedushi) of Tianxiong Circuit (天雄, headquartered in modern Handan, Hebei) and gave Li Congrong the honorary chancellor designation of Tong Zhongshu Menxia Pingzhangshi (同中書門下平章事). His brother Li Conghou was subsequently also given that honorary chancellor designation and made the mayor of Henan Municipality (河南, i.e., the Luoyang region) as well as the command of the imperial guards, and Li Congrong was displeased, apparently believing that effectively leads to Li Conghou's preempting him. (However, Li Siyuan's commission of Li Congrong was part of the military maneuver to take effective control of Tianxiong, as Tianxiong's capital Yedu (鄴都) had actually continued to be under the control of the same rebels that had forced him into rebelling against Li Cunxu, and, as part of the maneuver, Li Siyuan commissioned the general Fan Yanguang to serve as the military commander of the army at Yedu. Fan was able to attack Yedu and take control, allowing Li Congrong to take command of Tianxiong.)

Later in 927, there was a time when Li Siyuan told An Chonghui, who was then his chief of staff, that he had commissioned some famed civilian scholars to serve on Li Congrong's staff to try to positively influence him, but that some of Li Congrong's associates had falsely declared that the emperor had decreed that scholars should not approach Li Congrong lest that they render him weak. Li Siyuan wanted to put those associates to death, but An advocated merely stern rebuke. It was not stated in history what came of this incident.

In summer 928, Li Siyuan made a series of transfers of key military governors. As part of that series of transfers, Li Congrong was transferred to Hedong Circuit (河東, headquartered in modern Taiyuan, Shanxi) to serve as its military governor and the defender of its capital Taiyuan. It was said that Li Congrong was arrogant in his youth and not paying proper attention to governance. Li Siyuan felt compelled to send, among his own associates, a man whom he believed Li Congrong respected (the man's identity is lost to history) to serve on Li Congrong's staff to try to positively influence him. The man informed Li Congrong that Li Conghou had a much better reputation and that he should better himself so that his reputation can at least match Li Conghou's. Li Congrong was displeased by the advice, and informed this to his officer Yang Siquan (楊思權). Yang subsequently threatened the man, claiming that man was helping Li Conghou to overtake Li Congrong in succession. The man, in fear, informed the threat to Li Congrong's deputy Feng Yun, whom Li Siyuan had apparently installed to be in actual command. Feng informed Li Siyuan, and Li Siyuan called Yang to his presence in order to disassociate him from Li Congrong, but, on Li Congrong's account, did not punish Yang. When Feng was subsequently recalled to the imperial government to serve as the director of palace affairs, he warned the key officials in charge of government that Li Congrong had a harsh character and was acting frivolously, and needed good counsel. Shortly after, Li Congrong was recalled from Hedong to serve as the mayor of Henan and the commander of the imperial guards, and Li Conghou was made the military governor of Hedong, effectively swapping positions with Li Congrong.

== During Li Siyuan's late reign ==
In 930, Li Siyuan created Li Congrong the Prince of Qin. (Several days later, he created Li Conghou the Prince of Song.) By this point, Lady Cao had been created empress, and it was after Li Congrong's and Li Conghou's creations as princes that their mother Lady Xia was posthumously honored an empress as well.

Li Congrong liked writing poetry, and he gathered a number of poets, headed by Gao Nian (高輦), to serve on his staff. He often spent time with them in writing and reciting poetry, such that, when he gathered his staff member for feasts, he would order them to write poetry. The ones who wrote poems that he did not like would be ejected from his staff. When Li Siyuan heard this, he tried to correct Li Congrong's ways by encouraging him to spend more time studying rather than on poetry. It is not known how Li Congrong reacted to his father's advice.

By this point, An Chonghui had been executed by Li Siyuan on suspicion of treason, and Li Congrong was effectively the most powerful individual at court, with Li Siyuan's favorite concubine Consort Wang and the eunuch Meng Hanqiong influential inside the palace. While Fan Yanguang and Zhao Yanshou (whose wife was a sister of Li Congrong's) were serving as chiefs of staff, succeeding An, Li Congrong did not respect them as he did An, such that he often insulted them. He was also suspicious and jealous of Li Conghou's reputation. Another brother-in-law, Shi Jingtang, did not want to be involved in the court scene in this atmosphere, particularly because his wife Princess Yongning was born of Empress Cao and had long had poor relations with Li Congrong, and therefore, in late 932, volunteered to be the military governor of Hedong. Li Siyuan agreed.

In spring 933, Li Siyuan gave Li Congrong the title of acting Shangshu Ling (尚書令) and the chancellor title Shizhong (侍中). (The Shangshu Ling title was an extreme honor, as it was a title that had been once borne by Tang dynasty's second emperor Emperor Taizong of Tang and thereafter, through the rest of the Tang dynasty, considered to be one that the emperor's officials should not dare to bear.)

In summer 933, someone suggested to Li Siyuan that the imperial princes be appointed teachers. The chancellors, however, feared Li Congrong, and did not dare to commission a teacher for him without his agreement, and therefore suggested to him that he recommend one himself. As his secretary Wang Jumin (王居敏) recommended the deputy minister Liu Zan (劉瓚) to him, he recommend Liu, a recommendation that Li Siyuan subsequently carried out, despite Liu's own attempt to decline (as he saw it as a demotion). Traditionally, the prince should honor his teacher, but Li Congrong treated Liu as a subordinate, leading to Liu's feeling humiliated. Their relationship subsequently broke down to such a point that Li Congrong refused to meet with Liu, and even did not have meals served to Liu.

Later in the year, the retired official He Ze (何澤), who wanted to return to governmental service, believed that flattering Li Congrong would be one way to accomplish that, and therefore offered a petition to Li Siyuan, requesting that Li Congrong be made Crown Prince. This proposal offended the emperor, who believed that designating a crown prince would render he himself obsolete, but felt compelled to have the chancellors discuss it. Li Congrong himself was also displeased, as he incorrectly believed that this was an attempt by Fan and Zhao to strip him of his military command. Fan and Zhao, seeing that neither the emperor nor the prince was happy about the proposal, instead proposed to have Li Congrong given the title of Generalissimo of All Armed Forces (天下兵馬大元帥, Tianxia Bingma Da Yuanshuai). Li Siyuan agreed. After his commission as generalissimo, Li Congrong gathered elite troops to serve as his guards, and was always escorted by them wherever he went. He had his staff members author for him a declaration against Later Tang's southeastern neighbor Wu, stating his intent to conquer it. He also continued to have conflict with Fan and Zhao, stating to others that he would slaughter their families if he became emperor. In fear, both of them requested to be relieved as chiefs of staff and given military governorships. Li Siyuan initially refused, in anger, believing that they were abandoning him, but eventually agreed; they were replaced by Zhu Hongzhao and Feng Yun.

By winter 933, Li Siyuan had become deathly ill, and when Li Congrong entered to see him, he was no longer able to respond. Once Li Congrong left the palace, he believed that his father had died and was concerned that, due to his conflicts with the officials, the officials would try to divert succession from him. He sent messengers to Zhu and Feng, informing them of his intent to lead his troops into the palace. They both responded that doing so would be treason, to which he reacted angrily by launching troops. When he reached the palace, however, the palace guards fought back, and his own troops eventually collapsed. The imperial guard general Zhu Hongshi (朱洪實) subsequently attacked Li Congrong's mansion, and the officer An Congyi (安從益) killed him and his wife, presenting his head to Li Siyuan. His sons were also executed. His staff members—despite their generally not involved in his uprising—were largely exiled. Subsequently, Li Siyuan summoned Li Conghou, intending to pass the throne to him, but died before Li Conghou arrived. Li Conghou subsequently took the throne.

== Notes and references ==
- History of the Five Dynasties, vol. 51.
- New History of the Five Dynasties, vol. 15.
- Zizhi Tongjian, vols. 275, 276, 277, 278.
