= Li Siyuan =

Emperor of Later Tang from 926 to 933

Emperor Mingzong of Later Tang 後唐明宗
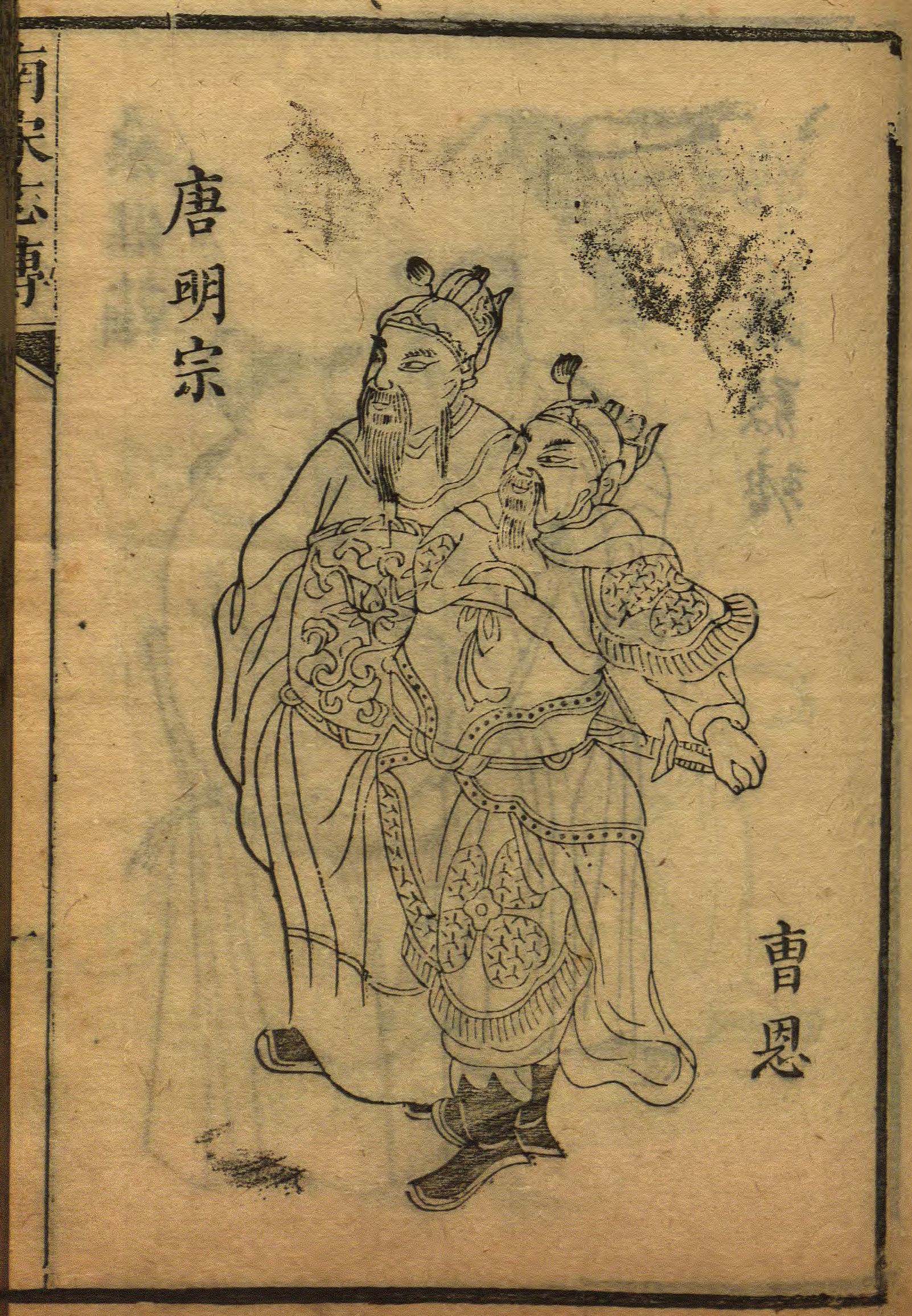

Emperor of the Later Tang dynasty
- Reign: 3 June 926 – 15 December 933
- Predecessor: Li Cunxu
- Successor: Li Conghou
- Born: 10 October 867; Yingzhou, Tang dynasty (today's Ying County, Shanxi)
- Died: 15 December 933 (aged 66); Luoyang, Later Tang dynasty (today's Luoyang, Henan)
- Burial: 11 June 934; Hui Mausoleum (徽陵; in today's Mengjin County, Luoyang, Henan); 34°47′5.28″N 112°33′54.72″E
- Spouse: See § Family
- Issue: Li Congrong; Empress Li of Later Jin; Li Conghou; others
Names
- Shatuo name: Miaojilie (邈佶烈); Chinese surname: Lǐ (李); Chinese given name: Sìyuán (嗣源), changed to Dǎn (亶) on 5 February 927
Era dates
- Tiānchéng (天成): 3 June 926 – 2 March 930; Chángxīng (長興): 3 March 930 –17 January 934
Regnal name
- Emperor Shèngmíng Shénwǔ Wéndé Gōngxiào (聖明神武文德恭孝皇帝), after 30 December 929; Emperor Shèngmíng Shénwǔ Guǎngdào Fǎtiān Wéndé Gōngxiào (聖明神武廣道法天文德恭孝皇帝), after 27 August 933
Posthumous name
- Short: Emperor Héwǔ (和武皇帝); Full: Emperor Shèngdé Héwǔ Qīnxiào (聖德和武欽孝皇帝)
Temple name
- Míngzōng (明宗, "Bright Ancestor")
- House: Li
- Dynasty: Later Tang
- Father: Li Ni (李霓) (biological); Li Keyong (adoptive)
- Mother: Lady Liu (劉氏) (biological)

Li Siyuan
- Chinese: 李嗣源
Transcriptions
Standard Mandarin
- Hanyu Pinyin: Lǐ Sìyuán
- Wade–Giles: Li^{3} Ssu^{4}-yüan^{2}
Yue: Cantonese
- Yale Romanization: Lei^{5} Ji^{6}-yun^{4}
- Jyutping: Lei^{5} Zi^{6}-jyun^{4}

Li Siyuan (李嗣源, later changed to Li Dan (李亶) (Note: Many Chinese emperors changed their given names to rarely encountered characters to alleviate the burden of the populace who must observe naming taboo.)) (10 October 867 – 15 December 933), also known by his temple name as the Emperor Mingzong of Later Tang (後唐明宗), was the second emperor of the Later Tang dynasty of China, reigning from 926 until his death. He was an ethnic Shatuo originally named, in the Shatuo language, Miaojilie (邈佶烈).

Adopted by the ethnic Shatuo ruler Li Keyong of the Former Jin dynasty, Li Siyuan became a trusted general under both Li Keyong and Li Keyong's successor Li Cunxu (Emperor Zhuangzong), the Later Tang founder. In 926 he seized power by a coup d'état when a mutiny called the Xingjiao Gate Incident killed Li Cunxu, and ruled with both discipline and compassion for the next seven years. Despite an abundance of natural disasters, his reign was markedly more peaceful than the half-century preceding it.

== Background ==
Li Siyuan was born with the Shatuo name of Miaojilie in 867 in Yingzhou (應州; present-day Ying County, Shanxi), without a surname like his nomadic Turkic ancestors. His father, referred in Chinese historiography books by his Chinese name Li Ni (李霓), was a military general under Li Guochang, the Shatuo leader in the region who received the imperial surname Li for contributions to the Tang dynasty court. He was Li Ni's oldest son. His mother was a Lady Liu, who was later honored with the title of Lady of Song.

In 878, however, Li Guochang and his son Li Keyong rebelled against the Tang. In 880, they were defeated by the joint forces of military governor Li Zhuo (李琢) and Tuyuhun chieftain Helian Duo, and the Shatuo army fled northward to the Yin Mountains where they sought refuge with a Mohe tribe. Some time after Li Ni's death (predating Li Guochang's and Li Keyong's defeat) in 879 (when Miaojilie was 12), Li Guochang took Miaojilie as a bodyguard, having been impressed by the son's mounted archery skills reminiscent of the father. It was said the teenager never missed when he aimed at hovering birds on hunting trips.

== Career under Li Keyong ==
Around that time the Tang court had great trouble with the large anti-government force of Huang Chao, who declared himself emperor of a new state of Qi, and therefore pardoned the Shatuos, allowing them to return to their home land on the condition that they join the military campaign against Huang's Qi state. In 883, Li Keyong was made the military governor (Jiedushi) of Hedong Circuit (河東, headquartered in modern Taiyuan, Shanxi) after a major victory against Qi.

Miaojilie had been serving Li Keyong, who, finding the quiet youngster earnest and dedicated, adopted him as a son and bestowed him the Chinese name Li Siyuan. On 11 June 884, Li Keyong unsuspectingly entered Bian Prefecture (汴州; today's Kaifeng, Henan) to attend a grand feast hosted by fellow military governor and Bianzhou's prefect Zhu Wen (Zhu Quanzhong), whom he had just saved from Huang Chao's siege. At night, a completely drunk Li Keyong was ambushed in his lodging by Zhu's assassins who had already placed felled trees, fences and wagons to block the exits. Amidst the chaos, 16-year-old Li Siyuan helped his master climb over a low wall; together they escaped flying arrows unharmed, helped in part by a thunderstorm, even though over 300 (mostly intoxicated) attendants were butchered. Upon their return to Hedong, Li Siyuan was given the command of Li Keyong's bodyguard cavalry.

In 890, Li Keyong's old enemy Helian Duo attacked northern Hedong with his Xianbei tribesmen, reinforced by Tibetan and Yenisei Kirghiz troops. Li Cunxin — an older adopted son of Li Keyong's — resisted the invasion but was defeated. Li Keyong sent Li Siyuan to assist him, and soon the Hedong force expelled the enemy, even capturing Helian's son-in-law. A couple of years later, Li Siyuan demonstrated his military leadership again by leading a force to quell a rebellion, capturing its leader Wang Bian (王弁). Once at a gathering, generals started bragging about their accomplishments, when Li Siyuan interrupted and spoke slowly: "You sirs, use your mouths to attack enemies. I use my hands to attack enemies." Everybody fell silent.

In 896, Li Cunxin was allocated 30,000 men to reinforce the warlord cousins Zhu Xuan and Zhu Jin against the hated enemy Zhu Wen. Instead, Li Cunxin stayed behind and sent Li Siyuan to the front line with only 300 cavalrymen. Nevertheless, Li Siyuan successfully dispersed Zhu Wen's army and relieved Zhu Jin. When warlord Luo Hongxin surprised and defeated Li Cunxin afterwards, Li Siyuan fended off the attackers before returning home with Li Cunxin's main force. Praised by Li Keyong, he shared the rewards among his soldiers as usual.

In 898, Li Keyong's general Li Sizhao was soundly defeated by Zhu Wen's general Ge Congzhou, just as Li Siyuan arrived to reinforce him. Noticing the frightened soldiers, Li Siyuan told Li Sizhao, "If we return empty-handed, important things will be lost. Sir, I'd like to fight for you and die if I'm unsuccessful, it's better than imprisonment." He dismounted from his horse, sharpened his weapons, and ascended to an elevated position where he directed his soldiers in the rehearsed formation. When Ge's troops arrived, he shouted at them: "My prince ordered me to get Lord Ge. Nobody else needs to die with him!" In no time he led his soldiers into battle, and with the help of Li Sizhao, expelled the enemy. Only then was it discovered that Li Siyuan was soaked in his own blood; arrows had punctured his body in four places. As Li Keyong, already the Prince of Jin by title, personally removed the clothing and medicated the wounds with alcohol, he remarked with pride: "My son is such an extraordinary man!" Li Siyuan's fame started to spread. Another anecdote illustrated his frugal life style: once, seeing that Li Siyuan's residence had no material goods other than weapons, Li Keyong took him home and told his adopted son he could take anything he wanted. Li Siyuan left with a piece of cloth and a few strings.

In 902, Li Keying's archenemy Zhu Quanzhong, after his Xuanwu (宣武, i.e., Bian Prefecture) army, commanded by his general Shi Shucong (氏叔琮) and nephew Zhu Youning (朱友寧), defeated the Hedong army commanded by Li Siyuan's adoptive brother Li Sizhao and Zhou Dewei at Pu County (蒲縣, in modern Linfen, Shanxi), ordered Shi and Zhu Youning to advance to Hedong's capital Taiyuan to put it under siege. With a substantial portion of Li Keyong's army not available at that time at Taiyuan, the city appeared that it would be falling, and Li Keyong considered abandoning it and fleeing to Yun Prefecture (雲州, in modern Datong, Shanxi) — a strategy that Li Cunxin advocated. However, Li Siyuan, along with Li Sizhao and Zhou, advocated steadfast defending the city, and they, as well as Li Keyong's wife Lady Liu, were able to convince Li Keyong to stay and defend the city. Subsequently, raids that Li Sizhao and Li Siyuan lead against the Xuanwu army disrupted the Xuanwu army's food supplies, and Zhu Quanzhong decided to order its withdrawal. (Still, because of this siege, for several years, Li Keyong did not dare to again battle Zhu for supremacy of northern China.)

In 907, Zhu seized the throne from Tang's last emperor Emperor Ai, ending Tang and starting a new state/dynasty of Later Liang. Li Keyong, as Prince of Jin bestowed by Tang dynasty, along with several other regional governors and warlords (Li Maozhen the Prince of Qi, Yang Wo the Prince of Hongnong, and Wang Jian the Prince of Shu), refused to recognize Zhu as emperor and continued to consider themselves as vassals of the now defunct Tang state — but were in effect, rulers of their own independent states by this point. Li Siyuan continued to serve his adoptive father in this new Jin state. Shortly after, Zhu sent his general Kang Huaizhen (康懷貞) to command an army to attack Jin's Zhaoyi Circuit (昭義, headquartered in modern Changzhi, Shanxi), then under Li Sizhao's governance. Zhu himself then followed with a larger army, and the Later Liang army put Zhaoyi's capital Lu Prefecture (潞州) under intense siege, fully intent on capturing it. Li Keyong sent a relief force, under the overall command of Zhou Dewei, with Li Siyuan, Li Siben (李嗣本, another adopted son of Li Keyong), Li Cunzhang (李存璋), and An Jinquan (安金全) serving under Zhou, to try to lift the siege, but while the relief army was able to harass the Later Liang army, it was unable to lift the siege. Soon, the city was in a desperate position as food supplies were dwindling. During the midst of the siege, Li Keyong grew ill at Taiyuan and died in spring 908 and was succeeded as Prince of Jin by his biological son Li Cunxu.

== Career under Li Cunxu ==
=== During Jin ===
Li Cunxu decided to lead the army to relieve Lu Prefecture himself, and as he advanced there, he caught the Later Liang army, which was not expecting him to be able to come so quickly, by surprise. He had Li Siyuan lead the assault on the northeast side, and Zhou Dewei lead the assault on the northwest side. The Later Liang army surrounding the city collapsed, and the siege was lifted.

In 910, another major confrontation between Jin and Later Liang began to take shape, as Zhu Quanzhong, believing that his vassal Wang Rong – the Prince of Zhao and the military governor of Wushun Circuit (headquartered in modern Shijiazhuang, Hebei) – might be considering to align with Jin and turning against Later Liang. He therefore decided to, by trick, seize Wushun's Shen (深州) and Ji (冀州, both in modern Hengshui, Hebei) Prefectures and slaughter the Wushun garrisons at those prefectures, with the intent to then use the prefectures as the base for taking over Wushun entirely. When this occurred, Wang Rong and his ally Wang Chuzhi, the military governor of Yiwu Circuit (義武, headquartered in modern Baoding, Hebei) turned against Later Liang and sought aid from Li Cunxu. Li Cunxu launched an army to head to the aid of Wang Rong and Wang Chuzhi. Subsequently, in a battle that Li Siyuan served as a battlefield commander, at Boxiang (柏鄉, in modern Xingtai, Hebei), the Jin army crushed the Later Liang army, securing Wushun (which was then changed back to its Tang name Chengde (成德)) and Yiwu from further Later Liang attack.

In 912, Li Cunxu launched a major campaign, intending to destroy the Yan state ruled by Liu Shouguang, with Zhou in command of the overall operations. As part of the campaign, Li Siyuan was in charge of attacking Ying Prefecture (瀛州, in modern Cangzhou, Hebei), and he was successful in getting its prefect, Zhao Jing (趙敬), to surrender. Subsequently, when Liu sent his major general Yuan Xingqin to his northern borders with the Khitan Empire to await potential aid from Khitan's Emperor Taizu, Li Cunxu sent Li Siyuan to intercept Yuan's army. Li Siyuan first attacked Wu Prefecture (武州, in modern Zhangjiakou, Hebei), and its prefect Gao Xinggui (高行珪) surrendered. Yuan then attacked Wu Prefecture, and when Li Siyuan came to its aid, Yuan tried to withdraw, but Li Siyuan subsequently engaged him eight times and forced him into surrendering. Li Siyuan took Yuan as an adoptive son and kept Yuan under his command. (Gao Xinggui's brother Gao Xingzhou, whom Gao Xinggui sent to seek aid from Li Siyuan, also joined Li Siyuan's army and subsequently often commanded Li Siyuan's guards along with Li Siyuan's adoptive son Li Congke – the son of Li Siyuan's concubine Lady Wei.) Jin forces were subsequently able to destroy Yan and add its territory to Jin. (In 915, when Li Cunxu heard of Yuan's ferocity in battle, he requested that Li Siyuan send Yuan to serve under his own personal army, and Li Siyuan, unwilling to resist the order, reluctantly sent Yuan to Li Cunxu. Li Cunxu also wanted Gao Xingzhou and tried to entice Gao with promotion offers, but Gao declined to leave Li Siyuan's command.)

In 916, when the Later Liang major general Liu Xun tried to attack Wei Prefecture (魏州, in modern Handan, Hebei), which had recently surrendered to Jin – an attack that Li Cunxu anticipated and therefore reacted to immediately – Li Siyuan and his adoptive brother Li Cunshen served as main commanders under Li Cunxu. In the subsequent battle, the Jin army crushed the Later Liang army, ending Liu's hopes of defeating Li Cunxu there. When the Later Liang military governor of Zhaode Circuit (昭德, headquartered in modern Handan) subsequently abandoned the circuit in light of Liu's defeat, Li Cunxu merged Zhaode's three prefectures, which had previously belonged to Tianxiong Circuit (天雄, headquartered at Wei) back into Tianxiong, and made Li Siyuan the prefect of Zhaode's former capital Xiang Prefecture (相州). When Jin forces subsequently approached Cang Prefecture (滄州, in modern Cangzhou), Later Liang's military governor of Shunhua Circuit (順化, headquartered at Cang), Dai Siyuan, abandoned it and fled back to Later Liang territory. Dai's officer Mao Zhang (毛璋) surrendered Cang to Jin. Li Cunxu sent Li Siyuan to pacify the region, and Li Siyuan subsequently sent Mao away to pay homage to Li Cunxu. Li Siyuan was subsequently made the military governor of Anguo Circuit (安國, headquartered in modern Xingtai). It was there where one of his officers, An Chonghui, became a key trusted staffer.

In 917, Khitan's Emperor Taizu launched a major attack on You Prefecture (幽州, in modern Beijing) – the former capital of Yan and now the capital of Jin's Lulong Circuit (盧龍), where Zhou served as military commander. Zhou sought emergency aid, but Li Cunxu was initially unsure what to do, given that he was in constant battles with Later Liang and was hesitant to divide his army to go to Zhou's aid. However, Li Siyuan, Li Cunshen, and Yan Bao (閻寶) all advocated for an army to be sent to aid Zhou. Li Cunxu agreed, and sent Li Siyuan as the commander of the forward troops, followed by Yan Bao, and then by Li Cunshen. The Jin relief forces were subsequently able to defeat the Khitan siege troops and lift the siege on You.

In fall 918, Li Cunxu planned to launch a major attack on Later Liang, and he gathered troops directly under his command at Wei. Zhou, Li Cunshen, and Li Siyuan all led their own troops to rendezvous with him there as well, along with troops sent by Wang Chuzhi. He crossed the Yellow River into Later Liang territory, with the intent of destroying Later Liang. Subsequently, the joint Jin forces encountered the Later Liang forces under He Gui at Huliu Slope (胡柳陂, in modern Heze, Shandong). The battle was initially a major Jin defeat, with Zhou being killed in the battle. In the confusion of the battle, Li Siyuan believed that Li Cunxu had already retreated north of the Yellow River, and therefore retreated. Li Cunxu, however, was subsequently able to turn the battle around and defeat He Gui's Later Liang forces, causing the battle to be an overall stalemate in which both sides lost over two thirds of their armies, before withdrawing back north. When Li Siyuan rendezvoused with him, Li Cunxu was displeased, believing that Li Siyuan had thought that he died and was abandoning the battle. However, as Li Congke, who got separated from Li Siyuan during the battle and ended up fighting under Li Cunxu during the second stage of the battle, had great contributions during it, Li Cunxu did not punish Li Siyuan, although he did not treat Li Siyuan with as great respect subsequently.

In 921, Wang Rong was killed in a coup instigated by his adoptive son Wang Deming, who subsequently took over the circuit, changed his name back to the birth name of Zhang Wenli, and slaughtered Wang Rong's family. Li Cunxu sent an army to try to destroy Zhang, commanded by Yan Bao and Shi Jiantang (史建瑭), but was contemplating leading an army himself as well after Shi was killed in battle. Dai, who was then the overall Later Liang commander of the army against Jin, tried to take advantage of the situation, but his attack on the Yellow River ford city of Desheng (德勝, in modern Puyang, Henan) was repelled by Li Cunxu himself, aided by Li Siyuan and Li Cunshen. Li Cunxu subsequently gave Li Siyuan the title of deputy commander of the Han and non-Han cavalry and infantry forces, and gave him the honorary chancellor title of Tong Zhongshu Menxia Pingzhangshi (同中書門下平章事). He then left Li Siyuan and Li Cunshen in defense of Desheng, while heading to join the Zhao campaign himself. When Dai subsequently tried to attack Wei Prefecture, Li Siyuan took his army to intercept Dai while warning Wei Prefecture. Dai thereafter changed directions and put Desheng under siege, but withdrew when Li Cunxu, hearing news of Dai's incursion, returned.

In spring 922, in light of a Khitan incursion, Li Cunxu made Li Cunshen the military governor of Lulong (aka You Prefecture), to defend against further Khitan attack. Li Siyuan was made the military governor of Henghai Circuit (previously known as Shunhua when under Later Liang rule), which Li Cunshen had been the military governor of, but remained with Li Cunxu's army.

=== During the destruction of Later Liang ===
In summer 923, Li Cunxu, then at Wei Prefecture, declared himself the emperor of a continuation of Tang — historically known as Later Tang. However, at the same time as his declaration, the Later Tang state was facing several serious threats that caused its subjects to be distressed about its prospects — the Khitan Empire was continuing to harass Lulong Circuit; Later Liang had just recently seized Wei Prefecture (衛州, in modern Puyang, different than the Wei Prefecture referred to above); and Zhaoyi Circuit, previously governed by Li Sizhao but under the control of his son Li Jitao after his battlefield death during the Zhao campaign, had just rebelled against Later Tang and pledged allegiance to Later Liang. At this juncture, though, an officer of Later Liang's Tianping Circuit (天平, headquartered in modern Tai'an, Shandong), Lu Shunmi (盧順密), defected to Later Tang, and revealed to Li Cunxu that Dai Siyuan, who was the military governor of Tianping, had left two unpopular officers, Liu Suiyan (劉遂嚴) and Yan Yong (燕顒), in defense of Tianping's capital Yun Prefecture (鄆州), and that a surprise attack on Yun could cause it to fall. When Li Cunxu consulted Li Siyuan, Li Siyuan, who had long wanted to have a specular achievement since the Battle of Huliu Slope, advocated carrying out this attack and volunteered to command his own troops. Li Cunxu agreed, and Li Siyuan thereafter led 5,000 elite soldiers and launched a surprise attack across the Yellow River, catching Liu and Yan unaware. When he quickly entered the city, Liu and Yan fled to the Later Liang capital Daliang. Li Cunxu thereafter commissioned Li Siyuan as the military governor of Tianping. Subsequently, the Later Liang emperor Zhu Youzhen (Zhu Quanzhong's son) replaced Dai with Wang Yanzhang, who tried to cut off the communications between Yun and the rest of Later Tang territory north of the Yellow River by capturing the fords at Desheng and Yangliu (楊劉, in modern Liaocheng, Shandong). He captured Desheng quickly, but Yangliu's defenses held under the defense of Li Zhou (李周), and Li Cunxu was subsequently able to lift the siege on Yangliu, allowing Yun to remain in contact with Later Tang proper.

After the failure to capture Yangliu, Zhu replaced Wang with Duan Ning, who prepared an ambitious four-prong attack against Later Tang:

1. Dong Zhang would head toward Taiyuan.
2. Huo Yanwei would head toward Zhen Prefecture (鎮州, formerly Zhao's capital).
3. Wang and Zhang Hanjie (張漢傑) would head toward Yun Prefecture.
4. Duan himself, along with Du Yanqiu, would confront Li Cunxu.

However, the Later Liang officer Kang Yanxiao, at this junction, defected to Later Tang, revealing Duan's plan to the Later Tang emperor and pointing out that the plan left the Later Liang capital Daliang defenseless, and pointing out that Wang's and Zhang Hanjie's army was the weakest of the four prongs and could easily be defeated. Li Cunxu decided to take the risky move himself, and advanced to Yun to join forces with Li Siyuan, and then engage Wang and Zhang Hanjie. He defeated them, capturing both Wang and Zhang Hanjie at Zhongdu (中都, in modern Jining, Shandong). Li Cunxu sent Li Siyuan to try to persuade Wang to submit to him, but Wang, wanting death, disrespectfully stated to Li Siyuan, "Are you not Miaojilie?" Li Cunxu subsequently, knowing that Wang would not submit, executed Wang.

Li Cunxu weighed his options, as most of his officers suggested attacking east and capturing Later Liang's territory to the east of Yun. However, Kang and Li Siyuan both advocated attacking Daliang before Duan could withdraw to aid the city. Li Cunxu accepted their suggestion, and he continued to proceed toward Daliang with Li Siyuan as his forward commander. With Duan's army trapped north of the Yellow River and unable to come to his rescue, Zhu saw the situation as hopeless. He ordered his general Huangfu Lin (皇甫麟) to kill him; Huangfu did, and then committed suicide himself. When Li Siyuan reached the gates of Daliang, he met no resistance, and he entered and pacified the city. When Li Cunxu subsequently arrived, he happily stated to Li Siyuan, "I have gained the land under the heavens due to the accomplishment of you, Lord, and your son. I will share this land with you." He subsequently bestowed the greater honorary chancellor title of Zhongshu Ling (中書令, head of Zhongshu Sheng) on Li Siyuan.

=== During Li Cunxu's subsequent governance ===
In spring 924, Khitan forces made an incursion into Lulong territory, going as deep into Later Tang as Waqiao Pass (瓦橋關, in modern Baoding). Li Cunxu sent Li Siyuan to command an army against the Khitan forces, with Huo Yanwei, now a Later Tang general, as his deputy. However, soon thereafter, Khitan forces withdrew, so he recalled Li Siyuan, instead leaving Duan Ning — now bearing the imperially-bestowed name of Li Shaoqin — and Dong Zhang at Waqiao Pass to defend it. Shortly after, though, there was yet another report of a Khitan incursion, so Li Siyuan was ordered to stop at Xing Prefecture (邢州, the capital of Anguo Circuit) to see if the Khitan would attack, while Li Congke and Li Shaobin were ordered to command cavalry forces to defend against the attack as well. Around this time, Li Siyuan, who, like other generals, feared false accusations by Li Cunxu's favored eunuchs and performers, sought to be relieved of his command, but Li Cunxu did not accept his resignation.

In summer 924, the Anyi Circuit (安義, i.e., formerly Zhaoyi) officer Yang Li (楊立), who had previously been trusted by Li Jitao, whom Li Cunxu had executed after his conquest of Later Liang, mutinied and seized control of Anyi's capital Lu Prefecture. Li Cunxu sent Li Siyuan to command the forces against Yang, with Yuan Xingqin — now with the imperially-bestowed name of Li Sharing — and Zhang Tingyun (張廷蘊) serving as his deputies. Zhang quickly advanced to Luo and entered it, capturing Yang and his coconspirators, before Li Siyuan and Li Shaorong could arrive. (Yang and his coconspirators were subsequently delivered to then-Later Tang capital Luoyang and executed.) After this campaign, Li Siyuan was made the military governor of Xuanwu Circuit and the commander of the Han and non-Han cavalry and infantry forces, replacing the recently deceased Li Cunshen.

In late 924, Li Cunxu ordered Li Siyuan to take 37,000 imperial guard soldiers to Bian Prefecture, and then to further take them north to be ready to engage the Khitan. When he went through Xingtang (興唐, i.e., formerly Wei Prefecture, which by this point was made into a special municipality), he requested 500 sets of armor from the Xingtang armory. The defender of Xingtang, Zhang Xian (張憲), believing that Li Siyuan's army needed the armors, approved the request without first seeking Li Cunxu's approval, but when Li Cunxu heard of this, he was very displeased, stating, "Zhang Xian, without my edict, decided to on his own give my armors to Li Siyuan. What is he intending to do?" He fined Zhang a month of Zhang's salary and ordered Zhang to retrieve the armors back from Li Siyuan's camp.

Shortly after, Li Siyuan defeated Khitan forces at Zhuo Prefecture (涿州, in modern Baoding). Meanwhile, Li Cunxu decided to realign his military governors to better defend against the recurrent Khitan threat. Li Cunxu transferred Li Shaobin from Henghai to Lulong, but thought that, while Li Shaobin was considered a capable general, he lacked the battlefield reputation, and therefore decided to transfer Li Siyuan to Chengde. After Li Siyuan received the transfer order, as his household was at Taiyuan, he requested that Li Congke, then serving as the prefect of Wei Prefecture (the prefecture in modern Puyang), be transferred to Taiyuan so that his household can be better watched after. This, however, drew Li Cunxu's ire, and Li Cunxu stated, "Li Siyuan holds a military command and controls a large circuit. Should he not know that both military and government matters are my prerogative, and how does he dare to make such a request for his son!" He demoted Li Congke, causing Li Siyuan to become worried and submit written explanations in apology for Li Cunxu's ires to die. However, when Li Siyuan subsequently sought to go to Xingtang, where he was at the time, to pay homage to him, he refused. Meanwhile, his chief of staff Guo Chongtao was apprehensive of Li Siyuan, and secretly suggested to him that Li Siyuan be relieved of command, or even killed; he refused Guo's suggestions.

In 925, when Li Cunxu's mother Empress Dowager Cao was seriously ill, Li Siyuan requested to be able to pay homage to her. Li Cunxu refused. (She died not long after.) Later in the year, when Li Cunxu considered launching a major attack to destroy Later Tang's southwestern neighbor Former Shu, he initially considered Li Shaoqin to command the army, but Guo opposed. When Li Siyuan was proposed by others, Guo argued that given the recurrence of Khitan incursions, Li Siyuan needed to stay at Chengde to guard against the Khitan. Instead, he recommended that Li Siyuan's oldest son Li Jiji be put in command. Li Cunxu agreed, and made Guo the deputy to Li Jiji, but be actually responsible for military matters. The Later Tang forces under Li Jiji and Guo were subsequently able to conquer Former Shu and forces its emperor Wang Yan's surrender in late 925. It was during Guo's absence that Li Siyuan was apparently finally allowed to go to the capital Luoyang to pay homage to Li Cunxu.

=== During the collapse of Li Cunxu's reign ===
Soon after Former Shu's fall, however, Li Cunxu and his wife Empress Liu came to suspect Guo Chongtao of hoarding wealth and planning to occupy Former Shu's territory to rebel himself. Empress Liu wanted to order Guo's death, and, after Li Cunxu initially refused to issue such an edict, issued her own edict to Li JIji and ordered Guo's death. Li Jiji carried the order out, leading to much shock and dissension among the imperial troops. Li Cunxu's subsequent execution of another major general, Li Jilin, only added to such dissent. Kang Yanxiao subsequently rebelled, and while his rebellion was quickly suppressed, the soldiers' dissensions continued, particularly because at that time, the Luoyang region was stricken with famine, leading to many rumors. Li Siyuan was also the subject of many rumors, leading to Li Cunxu's sending his close associate Zhu Shouyin to meet with and observe Li Siyuan. Zhu secretly informed Li Siyuan of this and stated, "Your achievements, Lord Chancellor, make your Lord comprehensive about you. You should consider trying to return to your fief to avoid disaster." Li Siyuan responded, "My heart does not sin against heaven or earth. If disasters come, I cannot avoid it. It will be my lot." It was said that several times Li Cunxu came to believe the rumors about Li Siyuan, but Li Cunxu's director of palace affairs, Li Shaohong protected Li Siyuan such that no disaster came to Li Siyuan.

At that time, Li Cunxu was faced with several mutinies north of the Yellow River, the chief of which was at Xingtang, where the soldiers had forced the officer Zhao Zaili (趙在禮) into leading them in mutiny. Li Cunxu initially sent Li Shaorong to try to quell the rebellion, but Li Shaorong's siege of Xingtang was fruitless. The key officials, including Zhang Quanyi and Li Shaohong, all recommended that he send Li Siyuan, and despite his hesitations, he put Li Siyuan in command of the imperial guards and sent him against the Xingtang rebels. Li Siyuan subsequently arrived at Xingtang and put it under siege, but that night, the officer Zhang Pobai (張破敗) led a mutiny and took Li Siyuan and his deputy Huo Yanwei — now with the imperially-bestowed name of Li Shaozhen — hostage, forcing them to join the Xingtang rebels. After some initial confusions in which the Xingtang rebels attacked and killed Zhang, the Xingtang rebels welcomed Li Siyuan and Li Shaozhen into the city, but subsequently allowed them to leave to regather their troops, after Li Siyuan made assurances to ally with them.

By this point, Li Shaorong, believing that Li Siyuan was rebelling against Li Cunxu, withdrew from the Xingtang vicinity and submitted reports to Li Cunxu that Li Siyuan had rebelled. Li Siyuan, with some Chengde troops who initially fled the scene having rejoined him, considered his options. He initially wanted to return to Chengde and then submitting a petition begging forgiveness for being unable to properly rein in his troops, but Li Shaozhen and An Chonghui pointed out that he would then be vulnerable to accusations of occupying the land for his own benefit. They, instead, recommended heading toward Luoyang to try to defend himself against Li Shaorong's accusations. On the way, he sent a number of messengers to Li Cunxu, hoping to explain himself, but these messengers were all intercepted and killed by Li Shaorong. Li Cunxu's attempt to verify Li Siyuan's intentions by sending Li Siyuan's son Li Congshen (李從審) to Li Siyuan was also thwarted by Li Shaorong, who eventually killed Li Congshen. Under the advice of his son-in-law Shi Jingtang, Li Siyuan changed his posture and instead prepared for battle against the imperial troops. He headed toward Daliang, as Li Cunxu also prepared to do so. When he reached Daliang first, the defender of Daliang, Kong Xun, welcomed him in, causing Li Cunxu, then on the way, to be dejected, and Li Cunxu returned to Luoyang. Shortly after, a mutiny occurred at Luoyang as well, and Li Cunxu was killed in battle while battling the mutineers.

Li Siyuan subsequently arrived at Luoyang at Zhu Shouyin's invitation. Initially, he stayed at his own mansion and ordered the soldiers to stop looting; he also gathered Li Cunxu's remains to prepare for funeral. When the officials encouraged him to take the throne, he declined, and stated to Zhu that he should continue to treat Li Cunxu's consorts Consort Han and Consort Yin with respect, and prepare for the return of Li Jiji, suggesting that he would return to Chengde once Li Cunxu was buried and Li Jiji took the throne. However, after repeated requests by officials, he took the title of regent. He issued orders for the imperial princes to be found. Li Shaozhen and An Chonghui, however, believing the situation to be untenable, secretly had two of Li Cunxu's younger brothers, Li Cunque (李存確) the Prince of Tong and Li Cunji (李存紀) the Prince of Ya, assassinated. By Li Siyuan's orders, Empress Liu, who fled to Taiyuan, was killed, and the soldiers also killed Li Cunxu's brothers Li Cunwo (李存渥) the Prince of Shen and Li Cunba (李存霸) the Prince of Yong. Several other imperial princes were never located, and only Li Cunxu's brother Li Cunmei (李存美) the Prince of Yong (different title than Li Cunba's) was spared on account of his illness. When Li Shaorong was captured, Li Siyuan personally questioned him, "How have I wronged you that you killed my son?" Li Shaorong stared at him and responded, "How has the deceased emperor wronged you?" Li Siyuan had him executed and his name changed back to Yuan Xingqin.

With the possibilities of a rapprochement with Li Jiji gone, Li Siyuan decided to resist Li Jiji's return. He sent Shi Jingtang and Li Congke to take up defensive positions at Shan Prefecture (陝州, in modern Sanmenxia, Henan), and Hezhong Municipality (河中, in modern Yuncheng, Shanxi), respectively, to block Li Jiji's potential return. Shortly after, with his own associates abandoning him, Li Jiji committed suicide. The general Ren Huan took over command of his army; when the army met Shi's, they submitted to Li Siyuan's rule.

With Li Jiji eliminated, Li Siyuan prepared to take the throne himself. Li Shaozhen and Kong Xun, believing that Tang's heavenly mandate was over, advocated that he change the name of the state. However, Li Siyuan, citing the fact that he had long served Li Guochang, Li Keyong, and Li Cunxu, declined. Under the suggestion of Li Qi, he took the position that he was succeeding Li Cunxu legitimately, and, after a ceremony in which he first mourned Li Cunxu, took the throne as the new emperor.

== Reign ==
=== Early reign (Tiancheng era) ===
Li Siyuan commissioned An Chonghui and Kong Xun as his chiefs of staff, with An becoming effectively his chief advisor. Zheng Jue and Ren Huan served as chancellors, with Ren also served as the director of the three financial agencies (taxation, treasury, and salt and iron monopolies). (Li Cunxu's chancellors Doulu Ge and Wei Yue were initially retained as well, but were subsequently removed and exiled after they were accused of corruption.) As the emperor was illiterate, he had An read all of the submissions to for him, but An himself was also unable to comprehend all that were being submitted. Thus, under An's suggestion, the institution of imperial scholars of Duanming Hall (端明殿) was established, with the responsibility of processing and reading the submissions to the emperor, with Feng Dao and Zhao Feng serving as the inaugural scholars. As Li Siyuan's name contained two relatively common characters, he, in order to decrease the people's burden when observing naming taboo, ordered that only the consecutive use of Siyuan is to be avoided; the individual characters of yuan did not have to be avoided. However, apparently to further make it easier for people to observe the naming taboo, in 927, he renamed himself Li Dan. Also, when many generals who had received imperially-bestowed names from Li Cunxu requested that their original names be restored, he agreed.

Meanwhile, Li Siyuan tried to create a friendly relationship with Khitan. He sent his attendant Yao Kun (姚坤) as an emissary to Khitan, to announce to Khitan's Emperor Taizu (Yelü Abaoji) Li Cunxu's death. The Khitan emperor initially tried to rebuke Yao for how Li Siyuan took the throne, but Yao replied back that the Khitan emperor took over power under similar circumstances, making the Khitan emperor unable to reply. However, the Khitan emperor then demanded, as a term of peace, that the Later Tang territory north of the Yellow River be ceded to him. When Yao responded that he did not have authority to do so, the Khitan emperor put him under arrest, and then instead demanded Lulong, Chengde, and Yiwu Circuits. When Yao again refused, he was kept under arrest, and no peace was achieved between the states at that time.

Another issue confronting Li Siyuan was some military governors' unwillingness to fully accept his authority. The ones that An was particularly concerned about were Meng Zhixiang the military governor of Xichuan Circuit (西川, headquartered in modern Chengdu, Sichuan) and Dong Zhang the military governor of Dongchuan Circuit (東川, headquartered in modern Mianyang, Sichuan) — whose territories were the ones captured earlier from Former Shu — because Dong was considered a strong-willed general and Meng was married to Li Cunxu's cousin (or sister). An's attempts to curb in their powers by sending to Meng an army monitor (Li Yan (李嚴)) and sending Dong a deputy military governor (Zhu Hongzhao) only increased tensions, such that Meng eventually executed Li Yan and Zhu fled back to Luoyang from Dong's domain. However, open hostility did not immediately occur, and Li Siyuan allowed Meng's wife (Grand Princess Qionghua) and son (Meng Renzan) to join him in Xichuan. It was, however, a different matter with Gao Jixing the military governor of Jingnan Circuit (荊南, headquartered in modern Jingzhou, Hubei), who had long ruled his circuit as an independent domain. Gao had been given three prefectures (Kui (夔州), Zhong (忠州), and Wan (萬州), all in modern Chongqing) that he long wanted on the eastern periphery of Former Shu when Later Tang destroyed Former Shu, but was not content. When he intercept a convoy of Former Shu goods that Li Jiji had previously sent down the Yangtze River, killed the officers, and kept the wealth, that was the final aggravation for Li Siyuan, and he declared a general campaign against Gao in spring 927. However, the Later Tang army against Jingnan, commanded by Liu Xun (劉訓), when putting Jingnan's capital Jiangling under siege, ran into weather and supply difficulties, and was eventually forced to withdraw, although the Later Tang general Xifang Ye (西方鄴) was able to recapture Kui, Zhong, and Wan Prefectures from Jingnan. Around that time, Feng and Cui Xie were made chancellors to replace the dismissed Doulu and Wei. (Cui's becoming chancellor was despite Ren Huan's vehement opposition, and in summer 927, Ren, sensing that Li Siyuan was displeased about the disputes between him and An, resigned his directorship of the three financial agencies and, shortly after, his chancellorship. When Zhu Shouyin, then the military governor of Xuanwu, subsequently rebelled at Bian Prefecture (as Li Siyuan was announcing an imperial visit there, along with the imperial army, and Zhu was fearful that it was targeting him), An, apparently believing that Ren might have instigated Zhu into doing so, persuaded Li Siyuan to have Ren put to death. Zhu's rebellion was quickly suppressed, and Zhu committed suicide.

Late in 927, Yang Pu, the king of Later Tang's southeastern neighbor Wu, with whom Later Tang had friendly relations, declared himself emperor. An suggested a campaign against Wu, but Li Siyuan did not approve it. Still, in early 928, An refused further emissaries from Wu, thus effectively breaking relations with Wu. Around that time, Li Siyuan considered visiting Yedu (鄴都, i.e., a new name for Xingtang), but the imperial army soldiers were displeased with yet another journey after the recent journey from Luoyang to Bian, and as a result, all kinds of rumors again started. When Li Siyuan heard of this, he decided not to visit Yedu.

In spring 928, there was an episode where An and another formerly close associate of Li Siyuan's, Wang Jianli the military governor of Chengde, were accusing each other of abuses; An was accusing Wang of allying with Wang Du the military governor of Yiwu (Wang Chuzhi's adoptive son, who had overthrown Wang Chuzhi in 921 and subsequently continued to govern Yiwu in de facto independence), while Wang Jianli accused An of authoritarianism and allying with the acting director of the three financial agencies, Zhang Yanlang by having their children marry. (Wang Du had in fact been trying to ally with Wang Jianli, but Wang Jianli was secretly reporting that attempt to the imperial government.) Li Siyuan, initially believing in Wang Jianli, decided to send An and Zhang out of the capital to serve as military governors, but after Zhu Hongzhao defended An, did not do so. However, as at that time Zheng Jue requested retirement, Li Siyuan kept Wang Jianli at the imperial government to serve as chancellor and the director of the three financial agencies.

Meanwhile, Wang Du was apprehensive about his relations with the imperial government, as Li Siyuan's administration, under An's auspices, had been stricter with military governors than Li Cunxu's had been. In addition to Wang Jianli, he was also sending secret correspondences to Huo Yanwei, then the military governor of Pinglu Circuit (平盧, headquartered in modern Weifang, Shandong); Fang Zhiwen (房知溫) the military governor of Zhongwu Circuit (忠武, headquartered in modern Xuchang, Henan); Mao Zhang the military governor of Zhaoyi Circuit; Meng Zhixiang; and Dong Zhang, hoping to alienate them from the imperial government. He similarly tried to entice Wang Yanqiu (i.e., Du Yanqiu, who had returned to his birth name) the military governor of Guide Circuit (歸德, headquartered in modern Shangqiu, Henan), who was then commanding the northern defense forces against Khitan, into an alliance, but when Wang Yanqiu rejected his overtures, unsuccessfully tried to have Wang Yanqiu assassinated. When Wang Yanqiu reported this to the imperial government, Li Siyuan ordered a general campaign against Wang Du, with Wang Yanqiu in command. Wang Yanqiu put Yiwu's capital Ding Prefecture (定州) under siege immediately, but chose to wear out Wang Du by surrounding the well-fortified city, rather than launch heavy assaults on it. Khitan's attempt to aid Wang Du was unsuccessful, and in early 929, Wang Du's officer Ma Rangneng (馬讓能) opened the city gates to allow the Later Tang forces in; Wang Du committed suicide, ending the campaign.

Simmering below the surface of Li Siyuan's reign was also the issue of succession. His oldest biological son Li Congrong was, by this time, serving as the military governor of Hedong, and was considered the likely heir, but he was said to be arrogant and inattentive to governance. Li Siyuan tried to have a friend of Li Congrong's advise him that his younger brother Li Conghou, who was serving as the mayor of Luoyang, was milder in disposition and diligent, and therefore was gaining better reputation, to correct Li Congrong's behavior. However, Li Congrong did not accept the advice, and instead was listening to his close associate Yang Siquan (楊思權), who was advocating that he gather officers around him to be able to react with force if he were bypassed. When Li Siyuan heard this, he recalled Yang, but did not punish Yang on account of Yang's close association with Li Congrong. In 929, he made Li Congrong the mayor of Luoyang and the commander of the imperial guards, while making Li Conghou the military governor of Hedong.

In late 928, Gao Jixing died and was succeeded by his son Gao Conghui, who had not agreed with his father's defiant stance toward Later Tang. Gao Conghui sent petitions through another Later Tang vassal, Ma Yin the king of Chu, and the Later Tang military governor of Shannan East Circuit (山南東道, headquartered in modern Xiangyang, Hubei), An Yuanxin (安元信), requesting Later Tang to allow him to submit again as a vassal. Li Siyuan agreed, and commissioned Gao Conghui as the military governor of Jingnan. He also formally ended the general campaign against Jingnan.

However, the relationship between Later Tang and another vassal, Wuyue, was deteriorating, as the king of Wuyue, Qian Liu, was arrogant in his old age, and had offended An Chonghui by using pompous language in his letters to An. In 929, Li Siyuan sent his attendants Wu Zhaoyu (烏昭遇) and Han Mei (韓玫) on a diplomatic mission to Wuyue. Upon their return, Han, who had grudges against Wu, accused Wu of bowing to Qian, referring to himself as "subject," and telling Qian about Later Tang state secrets. An had Wu put to death, and then persuaded Li Siyuan to issue an edict ordering Qian to retire as Taishi (太師) and stripping him of his other posts. It also ordered that all Wuyue emissaries be arrested wherever they could be found. Qian had his son Qian Chuanguan submit a petition on his behalf, pleading for him and defending him; Li Siyuan ignored it. At the same time, the Later Tang imperial government was carving out territories out of Xichuan and Dongchuan and establishing new circuits, to curb the strengths of Meng and Dong. The two of them, who had previously had a contentious relationship, entered into an alliance and prepared for war against the imperial government.

=== Late reign (Changxing era) ===
In 930, Li Siyuan created his wife Consort Cao, who then carried the imperial consort title of Shufei (淑妃), empress, and made his favorite concubine, Consort Wang, Shufei. Consort Wang had a liking for luxurious clothing, and An Chonghui tried to correct her behavior, citing to her the example of Li Cunxu's hoarding wife Empress Liu. She therefore came to resent An.

Meanwhile, there was also an adversarial relationship between An and Li Congke, stemming from a time in their youths when Li Congke battered An severely after a drunken argument, despite Li Congke's subsequent apologies to An. As of 930, Li Congke was serving as the military governor of Huguo Circuit (護國, headquartered at Hezhong Municipality), and An often criticized his governance to Li Siyuan, but Li Siyuan did not listen to it. Therefore, An resolved to remove Li Congke by other means. He induced Li Congke's subordinate Yan Yanwen (楊彥溫) into refusing to allow Li Congke to return to headquarters after Li Congke was out on a hunt once. When Li Congke inquired why Yang did this, Yang responded, "It is not that I, Yang Yanwen, forgot your grace, but it is by the orders of the Office of the Chiefs of Staff that you, Lord, report to the capital." When Li Congke reported this to Li Siyuan, Li Siyuan summoned both Li Congke and Yang to the capital, hoping to inquire of the situation, but An sent an army that captured and executed Yang (i.e., killing Yang so that Yang would not have an opportunity to report him). As a result of this incident, Li Siyuan relieved Li Congke of his command and had him return to his mansion. An subsequently tried to make further false accusations against Li Congke for allegedly stockpiling weapons, but with Consort Wang protecting Li Congke, Li Congke escaped further repercussions. Around the same time, Li Congrong was created the Prince of Qin and Li Conghou the Prince of Song.

Meanwhile, both Meng Zhixiang and Dong Zhang were nervous over the central government's buildup of armies at three circuits carved out of Dongchuan and Xichuan — Zhaowu (昭武, headquartered in modern Guangyuan, Sichuan); Baoning (保寧, headquartered in modern Langzhong, Sichuan); and Wuxin (武信, headquartered in modern Suining, Sichuan). When Dong's threats of rebellion if the imperial government continued to reinforce those circuits went unheeded by An, Dong and Meng rebelled in 931. (However, as noted by, inter alia, the modern historian Bo Yang, An's intent was to force Dong and Meng into rebellion so that he could destroy them.) Li Siyuan commissioned an imperial army, commanded by Shi Jingtang, to attack Meng and Dong. However, despite some early successes, the imperial army became bogged down in its confrontation with the two circuits, becoming stuck at Jian Prefecture (劍州, in modern Guangyuan), while the Dongchuan and Xichuan armies captured Zhaowu, Baoning, Wuxin, and Wutai (武泰, headquartered in modern Chongqing) Circuits. In late 930, An offered to head to the front to oversee the operations, and Li Siyuan agreed. However, after An left the capital, Shi, who did not favor the campaign in the first place, submitted a petition listing the reasons why the campaign was not advisable. Zhu Hongzhao, who was previously a close associate of An's and who was then the military governor of Fengxiang Circuit (鳳翔, headquartered in modern Baoji, Shaanxi), also submitted a petition accusing An of planning to take over Shi's army. Li Siyuan thus recalled An, and then relieved him of his position as chief of staff made him the military governor of Huguo. After An offered to retire, Li Siyuan made his nephew Li Congzhang the Prince of Yang the military governor of Huguo, but Li Congzhang then, apparently with Li Siyuan's approval, put An and his wife to death. (Upon An's demotion, Li Siyuan restored Li Congke's privileges and restored Qian Liu's offices, blaming An for provoking Qian, Dong, and Meng.)

Upon An's demotion, Shi withdrew from Jian and returned to imperial lands. Li Siyuan subsequently tried to make a peace overture to Dong and Meng. Meng was receptive, but Dong, as his son Dong Guangye (董光業) and Dong Guangye's family were slaughtered during the campaign, refused. As a result, Meng was initially hesitant to make peace with the imperial government himself. Dong, however, resolved to attack Xichuan and capture it himself. He was defeated by Meng's general Zhao Tingyin, however, and forced to flee back to Dongchuan's capital Zi Prefecture (梓州). Upon his return, his officers mutinied, killed him, and surrendered to Meng, allowing Meng to take over Dongchuan. At the suggestion of Fan Yanguang, Li Siyuan sent Meng's nephew Li Cungui (李存瓌) as an emissary to Meng, to persuade him to resubmit to the imperial government. Meng thus formally resubmitted to the imperial government, but was subsequently becoming more arrogant and independent. Subsequently, at Meng's request, Li Siyuan granted Meng the authority to commission the military governors and prefects of the six circuits now under this control.

After An's death, Li Congrong, who previously had been respectful of An, became uncurbed in his behavior. At this time, Consort Wang and the director of palace affairs, Meng Hanqiong, were in control of the palace, and Fan Yanguang and Li Siyuan's son-in-law Zhao Yanshou served as chief of staff in An's stead, but Li Congrong was not respectful of any of them and often insulted them, causing them to be fearful and often requesting to leave the imperial government. Shi Jingtang, whose wife was not born of the same mother as Li Congrong, also had an unfriendly relationship with Li Congrong, and therefore often wanted to leave the capital as well. In late 932, when Li Siyuan considered installing a strong military governor of Hedong to defend against possible Khitan incursions, Fan and Zhao recommended Shi, and therefore Shi was commissioned as the military governor of Hedong.

In 933, there were concerns that Li Renfu the military governor of Dingnan Circuit, whose family (ethnically Dangxiang) had ruled Dingnan in effective independence from the Later Tang imperial government, might ally with the Khitan. When Li Renfu happened to die at that time, the Dingnan soldiers supported Li Renfu's son Li Yichao as his successor. Li Siyuan decided to assert his authority over Dingnan, and he commissioned An Congjin the military governor of Zhangwu Circuit (彰武, headquartered in modern Yan'an, Shaanxi) as the acting military governor of Dingnan, while commissioning Li Yichao as the acting military governor of Zhangwu. Anticipating that Li Yichao would resist, Li Siyuan put Yao Yanchou (藥彥稠) the military governor of Fengxiang in command of an army to escort An Congjin to Dingnan. When Li Yichao did resist, Yao put Dingnan's capital Xia Prefecture (夏州, in modern Yulin, Shaanxi) under siege, but as the city was well-fortified, and Li Yichao's Dangxiang soldiers capably harassed the Later Tang army's supply route, the city's defense held. When Li Yichao subsequently pled for forgiveness, the Later Tang imperial army withdrew. It was said that from that point on, Dingnan no longer had respect for the imperial government. As Li Siyuan suffered a minor stroke at that time, that illness, coupled with the failure of the Dingnan campaign, led to many rumors in the army. When Li Siyuan tried to quell them by giving out bonus rewards for the soldiers, it instead led the soldiers to greater arrogance.

Shortly after, the retired official He Ze (何澤), who was yearning to return to governmental service and who wanted to ingratiate Li Congrong, decided to submit a petition to Li Siyuan asking for Li Congrong to be made crown prince — which, however, was a sensitive subject for Li Siyuan, who, as he read the petition, wept and stated to his attendants, "The officials want a crown prince. It is time for me to retire to my old home in Taiyuan." However, knowing that the subject was important, he ordered the chancellors and the chiefs of staff to discuss the matter. However, Li Congrong perceived the situation differently — and he soon went to see his father, stating, "I had heard that evil people had asked that I, your subject, be made the crown prince. I am still young, and I still need to learn how to govern. I do not wish to have this title." After he withdrew from Li Siyuan's presence, he went to see Fan and Zhao, and stated to them, "You want to make me crown prince in order to take away my military command and confine me in the Eastern Palace [(i.e., the crown prince's palace)]." Knowing that Li Siyuan and Li Congrong were both displeased, Fan and Zhao proposed that the petition be rejected, and under their advice, Li Congrong was given the title of Generalissimo of All Armed Forces (天下兵馬大元帥, Tianxia Bingma Da Yuanshuai).

Fearful of Li Congrong, Fan and Zhao continued to request to leave their posts as chiefs of staff, but Li Siyuan initially refused, believing that they were abandoning him. In fall 933, with Zhao's wife the Princess of Qi continuing to beg for him, Zhao was made the military governor of Xuanwu, and Zhu Hongzhao, who was then the military governor of Shannan East, was made chief of staff to replace him. Later in the year, Fan was also allowed to leave his post and was made the military governor of Chengde; Feng Yun replaced him.

== Death ==
On 5 December 933, the emperor fell seriously ill after a trip in the snow. A day later, as his eldest son Li Congrong visited him, Consort Wang whispered "Congrong is here" but elicited no response. Li Congrong was told by weeping palace attendants that his father could no longer recognize anyone, and left. The emperor woke up in the middle of the night coughing up blood. Asked by an attending maid whether he was clear-headed, he replied, "I do not know." He had a bowl of rice gruel and felt better in the morning, but Li Congrong did not come again, professing illness.

Li Congrong actually had other plans. Fearing that the throne would go to his younger brother Li Conghou, whom he felt was a more favored and worthy son, he decided to act first and seize power militarily. On the next day, the ill emperor was informed by his generals and eunuchs that Li Congrong was attacking the palace gates. In disbelief, he pointed his finger upwards and cried at length. To Li Chongji (李重吉), son of his stepson Li Congke, he compared his two sons, "The fact that your father and I could emerge from obscure pasts to claim the world, it was all because he repeatedly saved me in dangerous situations. Oh, the temerity of Congrong to commit a deed so sinister!" He told the men to handle the matter themselves.

After a day's battle, imperial guards killed Li Congrong, his wife and eldest son. The dying emperor collapsed on his couch upon hearing the news. The generals requested permission to kill Li Congrong's 2nd son, a child living in the palace. "For what crime!" was the reply, but the grandchild was killed nonetheless. When chancellor Feng Dao and other courtiers visited him, the dying emperor uttered in tears, "I am embarrassed to meet you, my subjects, under such tragic family conditions." After his death six days later, the next eldest son Li Conghou assumed the throne before the coffin.

== Ancestry ==
Ancestors of Li Siyuan, Emperor Mingzong of Later Tang (Note: Considering his ancestors were Turkic without surnames, the fact that they all had Chinese names here indicates that these names were probably all created posthumously after Li Siyuan became a "Chinese" emperor.)

16. Li Yu (李聿)
8. Li Jiao (李教)
17. Lady Cui (崔氏)
4. Li Yan (李琰)
9. Lady Zhang (張氏)
2. Li Ni (李霓)
5. Lady He (何氏)
1. Li Siyuan
3. Lady Liu (劉氏)

== Family ==
Parents

- Mother: Lady Liu, Lady of Song State (劉氏)
- Father: Li Ni (李霓) (biological)
- Adoptive father: Li Keyong

Consorts and their respective issue(s):

- Empress Hewuxian, of the Cao clan (和武顯皇后 曹氏) (Note: Cao became the empress in 930. She died in 937 as the empress dowager of her stepson Li Congke.)
  - Princess Yongning (永寧公主, d. 9 October 950), 3rd daughter
    - married the military governor Shi Jingtang in 933 and had issue ( a son)
- Empress Xuanxian of the Wei clan (宣宪皇后 魏氏) (Note: Lady Wei (魏氏), from Pingshan, Zhenzhou (鎮州平山; in modern Hebei), originally married to a man surnamed Wang (王) with a young son. When Li Siyuan attacked Zhenzhou in c. 893, he took Lady Wei and the son whom he renamed Li Congke. Lady Wei died a few years later in Taiyuan.)
- Empress Zhaoyi, of the Xia clan (昭懿皇后 夏氏; d.924)
  - Li Congrong, Prince of Qin (秦王 李從榮), 2nd son (Note: Li Congrong was Born in 928 and killed in 933 with his wife Princess Consort Liu (劉妃), son Li Chongguang (李重光) and a younger son.)
  - Li Conghou, Prince of Song (宋王李從厚; 914 – 934), 3rd son
- Pure Consort Wang, of the Wang clan (王淑妃 王氏) (Note: Pure Consort Wang was from Binzhou (邠州, in today's Shaanxi), originally sold to the house of Later Liang general Liu Xun as a maid. When Liu was killed, An heard of her beauty and mentioned it to Li Siyuan. Very respectful and dutiful towards Empress Cao and the emperor which soon made her the emperor's favorite concubine with the ability to influence politics. She was killed in 947 with her adoptive son Li Congyi.)
  - Li Congyi, Prince of Xu (許王 李從益, 931 – 947), 6th son
  - Princess Yong'an (永安公主), sixteenth daughter
    - Married Zhao Yanshou (趙延壽)
- Many palace women were conferred as Madames (夫人) in 932, including Consort Wang (王昭儀; of the "Luminous Deportment" rank), Consort Ge (葛昭容), Consort Liu (劉昭媛), Consort Gao (高婕妤), Consort Shen (沈美人) and Consort Zhu (朱順御).
- Unknown:
  - Li Congshen, the 1st son, changed his name to Li Jijing (李繼璟) days before his murder in 926 to become an adopted son of Li Cunxu's. He was posthumously named Li Congjing (李從璟).
  - Li Congyi, Prince of Xu (許王 李從益, 931 – 947), 6th son.
  - Princess Xingping (興平公主, d. 942), 13th daughter
    - married military governor Zhao Yanshou in 930
  - Princess Shou'an (壽安公主), 14th daughter
  - Princess Yongle (永樂公主), 15th daughter
  - Stepson: Li Congke, born in 885, was originally called Wang Ershisan (王二十三) before his mother Lady Wei remarried, committed suicide in 937 with wife Empress Liu (劉皇后) and son Li Chongmei (李重美); son Li Chongji (李重吉) and daughter Li Huiming (李惠明) killed earlier in 934 in 985's reign did not last much longer.

Nephews

- Li Congcan (李從璨), killed in c. 929.
- Li Congzhang (李從璋), conferred the Prince of Yang (洋王) in 933.
- Li Congwen (李從溫), born in c. 987, conferred the Prince of Yan (兗王) in 933, died in c. 937.
- Li Congmin (李從敏), conferred the Prince of Jing (涇王) in 933.
