= Li Conghou =

Emperor of Later Tang from 933 to 934

Emperor Min of Later Tang 後唐閔帝

Emperor of the Later Tang dynasty
- Reign: December 20, 933 – May 19, 934
- Predecessor: Li Siyuan
- Successor: Li Congke
- Born: Pusanu (菩薩奴); 17 December 914; Taiyuan
- Died: 24 May 934 (aged 19); Anyang
- Burial: Luoyang
- Empress: Empress Kong
- Issue: Li Chongzhe (李重哲), son Three sons, names unknown
Names
- Lǐ Cónghòu (李從厚); Pusanu (菩薩奴, childhood name)
Era name and dates
- Yìngshùn (應順): 934
Posthumous name
- Emperor Mǐn (閔皇帝, "careful")
Temple name
- None
- House: Li
- Dynasty: Later Tang
- Father: Li Siyuan
- Mother: Lady Xia

Li Conghou
- Traditional Chinese: 李從厚
- Simplified Chinese: 李从厚
Transcriptions
Standard Mandarin
- Hanyu Pinyin: Lǐ Cónghòu

Li Conghou (Chinese: 李從厚) (914–934), posthumous name Emperor Min of Later Tang (後唐閔帝), childhood name Pusanu (菩薩奴, "slave of a Bodhisattva"), was the third emperor of the Later Tang dynasty of China, ruling between 933 and 934. He was overthrown by his adopted brother Li Congke.

== Background ==
Li Conghou was born in 914, when his father Li Siyuan was a general of Jin (predecessor state to Later Tang), under his adoptive brother (Li Conghou's adoptive uncle) Li Cunxu the Prince of Jin. His mother was Lady Xia, who was either a concubine of Li Siyuan's or a co-wife with Lady Cao, and who was also the mother of his older brother Li Congrong. He was either Li Siyuan's third son (per the Old History of the Five Dynasties) or his fifth son (per the New History of the Five Dynasties). He was born at Li Siyuan's mansion in then-Jin capital Taiyuan. It was said that even in his childhood, he liked reading the Spring and Autumn Annals and was able to understand some of it. As his appearance was like his father Li Siyuan's, his father loved him.

== During Li Siyuan's reign ==
In 926, Li Cunxu, then the emperor of Later Tang, was killed in a mutiny at then-capital Luoyang. Li Siyuan subsequently claimed imperial title. In 927, he made Li Conghou the mayor of Henan Municipality (河南, i.e., the Luoyang region) as well as the honorary chancellor designation Tong Zhongshu Menxia Pingzhangshi (同中書門下平章事), as well as the command of the imperial guards. This displeased Li Conghou's older brother Li Congrong, who was then the military governor (Jiedushi) of Tianxiong Circuit (天雄, headquartered in modern Handan, Hebei), as this allowed Li Conghou to remain at the capital and control the imperial guards. (Li Conghou's and Li Congrong's mother Lady Xia was deceased by this point.)

In 928, Li Siyuan, under the suggestion of his favorite concubine Consort Wang, arranged to have Li Conghou betrothed to the daughter of the chancellor-chief of staff Kong Xun. This drew the anger of Kong's fellow chief of staff, the more powerful An Chonghui, whom Kong had earlier dissuaded from giving a daughter to a son of Li Siyuan's (unclear whether it was Li Conghou) in marriage, and An had Kong ejected from the imperial government (which was then at Kaifeng) to be the defender of Luoyang. Shortly thereafter, Li Conghou was made the military governor of Xuanwu Circuit (宣武, headquartered at Kaifeng) and continued to command the imperial guards. Later in the year, he married Lady Kong as his wife; Kong Xun was allowed to attend the ceremony, but due to An's opposition, was not allowed to remain at Kaifeng, and shortly after had to return to Luoyang. Meanwhile, it was said that Li Conghou developed a reputation for being respectful, humble, and willing to listen to others — characteristics that Li Siyuan hoped that his older brother Li Congrong, who was then the military governor of Hedong Circuit (河東, headquartered at Taiyuan) would emulate (as Li Congrong was said to be arrogant and violent), to no avail.

In 929, Li Siyuan made Li Conghou the military governor of Hedong and the defender of Taiyuan, while making Li Congrong the mayor of Henan and the commander of the imperial guards. (By that point, the imperial government had returned to Luoyang.)

In 930, Li Siyuan created Li Congrong the Prince of Qin and Li Conghou the Prince of Song.

In 931, Li Siyuan moved Li Conghou to Tianxiong.

In 932, Li Siyuan gave Li Conghou the greater honorary chancellor title of Zhongshu Ling (中書令). By that point, Li Congrong was the dominant figure at court, and was disrespectful of all high-level officials. He also was jealous for the fact that Li Conghou had better reputation than he had. Li Conghou, however, was humble toward his brother, such that the relationship between them was not completely damaged, at least in public.

By late 933, Li Siyuan was extremely ill. Li Congrong, concerned about whether the high-level officials would try to divert the succession away from him, tried to seize control of the imperial government by force, but was defeated by forces under the command of then-chiefs of staff Zhu Hongzhao and Feng Yun and killed. Li Siyuan subsequently decided to summon Li Conghou, but before Li Conghou could arrive at Luoyang, Li Siyuan died. Li Conghou subsequently arrived and took the throne.

== Reign ==
Upon Li Conghou's taking of the throne, Zhu Hongzhao and Feng Yun, believing that they were responsible for his becoming emperor, dominated the court scene. They also excluded a number of Li Conghou's close associates from court, despite his displeasure. Meanwhile, Li Conghou honored Li Siyuan's wife Empress Cao as empress dowager and Consort Wang as consort dowager (despite his nagging suspicions that she was in league with Li Congrong). (Historical accounts were inconsistent as to whether he also created his wife Princess Kong to be empress, although it appeared that she was created an empress but that he never got a chance to carry out a formal creation ceremony.)

Zhu and Feng were suspicious of Li Conghou's older adoptive brother Li Congke the Prince of Lu, who then served as the military governor of Fengxiang Circuit (鳳翔, headquartered in modern Baoji, Shaanxi), and brother-in-law Shi Jingtang, who then served as the military governor of Hedong. They removed Li Congke's son Li Chongji (李重吉) from his position as an officer of the imperial guards, while placing his daughter Li Huiming (李惠明), who was a Buddhist nun at Luoyang, inside the palace, causing Li Congke to become apprehensive. In spring 934, they further decided to dislodge Shi by moving Li Congke from Fengxiang to Hedong, Shi from Hedong to Chengde Circuit (成德, headquartered in modern Shijiazhuang, Hebei), and Chengde's military governor Fan Yanguang to Tianxiong. They did so without having Li Conghou issue a formal edict; rather, they issued these orders from the Office of the Chiefs of Staff.

This, however, drew a violent reaction from Li Congke, as he believed these movements to be targeting him. He thus rebelled, claiming that Zhu and Feng were falsely controlling the government. Li Conghou commissioned the general Wang Sitong to command an army against Li Congke. Wang's army was initially successful, and it appeared that Fengxiang's capital Fengxiang Municipality would fall. However, a mutiny by a group of soldiers under the officer Yang Siquan (楊思權), who surrendered to Li Congke, led to a chain reaction where the imperial army collapsed, with most of the soldiers surrendering to Li Congke. Li Congke then marched toward Luoyang.

Hearing of this military disaster, Li Conghou initially considered personally going to meet Li Congke and yielding the throne to him. However, his original inclination was opposed by the imperial general Kang Yicheng (康義誠) — who, instead, was planning on surrendering to Li Congke himself with the imperial army, but who claimed to be loyal and willing to fight Li Congke on the battlefield. Li Conghou put him in charge of the remainder of the imperial army and had him engage Li Congke. (Around this time, Li Chongji and Li Huiming were executed.) Instead, Kang surrendered to Li Congke.

Kang's surrender caused Li Conghou to panic. He considered fleeing to Tianxiong, and he summoned Zhu to plan the journey. Instead, Zhu committed suicide, and the imperial guard general An Congjin then killed Feng, offering Zhu's and Feng's heads to Li Congke. Li Conghou fled Luoyang with just 50 cavalry soldiers, toward Tianxiong's capital Wei Prefecture (魏州).

When Li Conghou reached Wei Prefecture (衛州, in modern Anyang, Henan, a different prefecture than the capital of Tianxiong), he encountered Shi, who had himself gone from Hedong south, initially intending to support Li Conghou. Shi consulted the prefect of Wei, Wang Hongzhi (王弘贄), who advised Shi that Li Conghou's cause was hopeless. When Li Conghou's guards Sha Shourong (沙守榮) and Ben Hongjin (奔弘進) heard of this, they cursed Shi for being faithless, and Sha tried to assassinate Shi, but he and Shi's guard Chen Hui (陳暉) ended up killing each other in mutual combat. Ben committed suicide. Shi's officer Liu Zhiyuan then slaughtered all of Li Conghou's guards, leaving Li Conghou alone at the imperial messenger station at Wei, while Shi himself and his followers continued on to Luoyang (to offer their allegiance to Li Congke).

Shortly after, Empress Dowager Cao issued an edict deposing Li Conghou and demoting him to the title of Prince of E, and declaring Li Congke emperor. Li Congke then took the throne at Luoyang. Meanwhile, Wang Hongzhi moved Li Conghou to a residence within the Wei Prefecture government. Li Congke then sent Wang's son Wang Luan (王巒) with poisoned wine to Wei. When Wang Luan met with Li Conghou, he did not mention what he was there for, but offered wine to Li Conghou. Li Conghou, knowing that the wine was poisoned, refused to drink, so Wang Luan strangled him to death. Li Congke also had Empress Kong and Li Conghou's four sons put to death. Li Conghou was buried with only ceremony due a prince, south of Li Siyuan's tomb. It was not until Shi subsequently overthrew Li Congke and declared himself emperor of a new Later Jin that he posthumously rehonored Li Conghou as an emperor.

== Personal information ==
- Father
  - Li Siyuan (Emperor Mingzong)
- Mother
  - Lady Xia, initially posthumously honored the Lady of Jin, later Empress Zhaoyi
- Wife
  - Empress Kong (executed by Li Congke 934) mother of all 4 princes
- Children
  - Li Chongzhe (李重哲) (executed by Li Congke 934)
  - Three sons, names unknown (executed by Li Congke 934)

Li Conghou Later Tang
Regnal titles
Preceded by Li Siyuan (Emperor Mingzong)	Emperor of Later Tang; 933–934	Succeeded by Li Congke
Preceded by Li Siyuan (Emperor Mingzong)	Emperor of China (Central); 933–934	Succeeded by Li Congke
Preceded by Li Siyuan (Emperor Mingzong)	Emperor of China (Southwestern); 933–934	Succeeded by Meng Zhixiang of Later Shu
