= Wang Sitong =

Jin general

Wang Sitong (Chinese: 王思同) (892 – May 9, 934) was a general of the Chinese Five Dynasties and Ten Kingdoms period state Later Tang (and Later Tang's predecessor state Jin. In 934, when Li Congke, the adoptive brother of then-reigning emperor Li Conghou, rebelled against Li Conghou, Wang was put in command of the army against Li Congke, and was soon defeated and executed without Li Congke's approval.

== Background ==
Wang Sitong was born in 892, during the reign of Emperor Zhaozong of Tang. His father Wang Jingrou (王敬柔) was an officer of Lulong Circuit (盧龍, headquartered in modern Beijing), and his mother was a daughter of Liu Rengong, a late-Tang dynasty warlord who would rule Lulong (although not yet at the time of Wang Sitong's birth — he would take over Lulong in 895, initially as a vassal of the major warlord Li Keyong the military governor (Jiedushi) of Hedong Circuit (河東, headquartered in modern Taiyuan, Shanxi), but later turning against Li and becoming an independent warlord).

In his youth, Wang Sitong served as an officer at his grandfather Liu's headquarters. In 907, Liu's son (Wang's uncle) Liu Shouguang carried out a coup, arresting Liu Rengong and putting him under house arrest. Wang, then 15, fled to Hedong with another uncle, Liu Shouqi (劉守奇), and the officer Li Chengyue (李承約). Li Keyong took them into his army and made them his officers.

== During Jin ==
After Tang fell (after its last emperor, Emperor Zhaozong's son Emperor Ai, was forced to yield the throne to the major warlord Zhu Quanzhong the military governor of Xuanwu Circuit (宣武, headquartered in modern Kaifeng, Henan), who established Later Liang), Li Keyong's Hedong Circuit became the center of a new state of Jin, ruled by Li Keyong and then his son Li Cunxu as prince. Wang Sitong continued to serve under Li Cunxu, whose Jin state eventually took over the region north of the Yellow River, causing the river to become the boundary between it and Later Liang, with which it engaged constant wars. During that war, Wang, at Li Cunxu's order, constructed a fortress at Yangliu (楊劉, in modern Liaocheng, Shandong), and thereafter was promoted to be a commander of 10 corps of troops known as the Shenwu (神武). It was in that role that Li Cunxu sent him in 921 to help Li Cunxu's ally Wang Du the military governor of Yiwu Circuit (義武, headquartered in modern Baoding, Hebei), against a Khitan Empire attack.

== During Later Tang ==
=== During Li Cunxu's reign as emperor ===
After Li Cunxu declared himself emperor of a new Later Tang and destroyed archrival Later Liang in 923, taking over Later Liang's territory, Wang Sitong was made either the prefect and/or the defender (防禦使, Fangyushi) of Zheng Prefecture (鄭州, in modern Zhengzhou, Henan). He was said to be magnanimous, and he liked to write poetry, using the alternative name of Jimen Zhanke (薊門戰客, "guest warrior from Jimen" (Jimen being an alternative name for Lulong's capital You Prefecture (幽州))) when doing so. It was said that Li Cunxu's oldest son and presumed heir Li Jiji the Prince of Wei treated Wang as a son. Wang was also said to be respectful to civilian officials, not greedy for money, and seeking to do right. In 926, when Li Cunxu executed the major general Li Jilin (formerly known as Zhu Youqian), it was Wang that he sent to Zhongwu Circuit (忠武, headquartered in modern Xuchang, Henan) to execute Li Jilin's son Zhu Lingxi (朱令錫) the military governor of Zhongwu. (Li Cunxu was subsequently killed after mutinies that rose due to his killings of Li Jilin and another major general, Guo Chongtao, and was succeeded by his adoptive brother Li Siyuan.)

=== During Li Siyuan's reign ===
After Li Siyuan became emperor, as he had known Wang Sitong for a long time and believed Wang to have been serving for too long without a proper promotion, he promoted Wang to be the military governor of Kuangguo Circuit (匡國, headquartered in modern Weinan, Shaanxi), and later transferred Wang to Xiongwu Circuit (雄武, headquartered in modern Tianshui, Gansu). During the years that Wang governed at Xiongwu, he was said to be gracious and comforting to his people, both Han and non-Han. In 930, he went to then-capital Luoyang to pay homage to Li Siyuan. Li asked him about the border defense, and he detailed it so vividly and described the 40 forts that he built to defend against Tufan attacks, such that Li stated, "I had heard that Wang Sitong did not pay attention to details. How could that be true?"

At that time, it was believed that a confrontation between the imperial government and two military governors — Meng Zhixiang of Xichuan Circuit (西川, headquartered in modern Chengdu, Sichuan), and Dong Zhang of Dongchuan Circuit (東川, headquartered in modern Mianyang, Sichuan) — was about to occur. Li, believing that Wang would be a general who can serve in the campaign, thus kept him as an imperial guard general at Luoyang. Shortly after, when Meng and Dong did openly rebel against the imperial government, Li put his son-in-law Shi Jingtang in command of an army against the two circuits and made Wang the forward commander for Shi. He also made Wang the defender of Chang'an.

During the campaign against Xichuan and Dongchuan, it was Wang, along with other generals Wang Hongzhi (王弘贄), Feng Hui (馮暉), and Zhao Zaili (趙在禮), who made a daring surprise attack against the key pass Jianmen Pass, surprising the Dongchuan garrison at Jianmen and allowing the imperial army to take Jianmen, for one time causing Meng to panic and believe that all was lost. However, as the rest of the imperial army could not follow up and meet up with them at Jianmen, they eventually had to abandon Jianmen and rejoin the rest of the imperial army, which subsequently became caught in a stalemate with the Xichuan/Dongchuan armies and was forced to withdraw. After the imperial army's withdrawal, Wang Sitong, for his accomplishments, was made the military governor of Shannan West Circuit (山南西道, headquartered in modern Hanzhong, Shaanxi).

Around the same time that the campaign against Xichuan and Dongchuan was abandoned, Li executed the main proponent for the campaign, his chief of staff An Chonghui, and sought rapprochement with the two circuits. Meng desired peace with the imperial government, but Dong, because the imperial government had executed his son Dong Guangye (董光業) and Dong Guangye's family, rejected it, and further renounced his alliance with Meng and attacked Meng. Wang notified the imperial government of this, Li's new chief of staff Fan Yanguang suggested to him that this was the time to act against the two circuits while they were fighting with each other, so Li ordered Wang to begin planning for such a campaign. However, shortly after, Meng defeated Dong, who was then killed by his subordinates, and Meng took over Dong's realm. The imperial government thereafter abandoned further designs on the two circuits, as Meng nominally resubmitted to the imperial government as a vassal. Wang was thereafter returned to Chang'an to serve as its defender.

=== During Li Conghou's reign ===
Li Siyuan died in late 933 and was succeeded by his biological son Li Conghou the Prince of Song. In early 934, his chiefs of staff Zhu Hongzhao and Feng Yun, not wanting Shi Jingtang, who was then the military governor of Hedong, to become entrenched there, issued orders transferring Li Conghou's older adoptive brother Li Congke the Prince of Lu from Fengxiang Circuit (鳳翔, headquartered in modern Baoji, Shaanxi) to Hedong, Shi from Hedong to Chengde Circuit (成德, headquartered in modern Shijiazhuang, Hebei), and Fan Yanguang from Chengde to Tianxiong Circuit (天雄, headquartered in modern Handan, Hebei).

This, however, drew a reaction from Li Congke, who believed that these moves were intended to target him. He decided to rebel, and he issued a declaration denouncing Zhu and Feng. He sent emissaries to the nearby circuits, hoping that their governors would join him in rebellion. When his emissaries Hao Xu (郝詡) and Zhu Ting'ai (朱廷乂) to Chang'an, hoping to convince Wang to join him. Wang, however, believed that Li Congke's rebellion was without cause, and therefore arrested Hao and Zhu and reported this to the imperial government.

The imperial government subsequently put Wang in command of the army against Li Congke, and gave Wang the honorary chancellor designation Tong Zhongshu Menxia Pingzhangshi (同中書門下平章事). However, it was said that while Wang was a faithful and honorable man, he was not capable at commanding a large army, and many of the imperial army soldiers, having previously served under Li Congke (as Li Congke and Shi were two of Li Siyuan's main generals), were secretly supportive of him, hoping to benefit from the campaign. Wang quickly arrived at Fengxiang's capital Fengxiang Municipality and put it under siege, and it appeared that the city, which did not have strong defensive bulwarks, would fall quickly. However, a tearful declaration by Li Congke from the city walls caused the imperial army soldiers to become sympathetic to him. When one of the generals under Wang, Zhang Qianzhao (張虔釗) the military governor of Shannan West, subsequently angered the soldiers by forcing them, under the threat of swords, to scale Fengxiang's wall, the soldiers turned against Zhang, and the officer Yang Siquan (楊思權) took the opportunity to defect to Li Congke, causing the imperial army to collapse. Wang and the other generals fled. When Wang and his deputy commander Yao Yanchou (藥彥稠) reached Chang'an, the deputy defender of Chang'an, Liu Suiyong (劉遂雍), refused to receive them, forcing them flee further east to Tong Pass. (Liu subsequently surrendered the city to Li Congke.)

Li Congke, after entering Chang'an, continued to advance east. When he reached Zhaoying (昭應, in modern Xi'an, Shaanxi), he heard news that his forward troops had captured Wang, and he commented, "While Wang Sitong's strategies were wrong, he was faithful to whom he served, and should receive praise." When he reached Lingkou (靈口, also in modern Chang'an), Wang was delivered to him. When Li Congke rebuked him, Wang pointed out that he was compelled by Li Siyuan's grace to him to remain faithful to the imperial government, and he asked for death. Li Congke was touched, and intended not to punish him. However, the former imperial army officers who surrendered to Li Congke, including Yang, did not want to see Wang again — and, in particular, one of those officers, Yin Hui (尹暉), had, when entering Chang'an, seized Wang's wealth and household and thus feared the consequences if Wang survived this encounter. He therefore repeatedly warned Li Congke's close associate Liu Yanlang (劉延朗) that sparing Wang would cause dissension among the ranks. Liu decided to act by himself, and he waited for an occasion when Li Congke was drunk to execute Wang and his wife. When Li Congke woke from his stupor, he was angry with Liu and sighed for several days over Wang's death, but did not further punish Liu.

== Notes and references ==
- History of the Five Dynasties, vol. 65.
- New History of the Five Dynasties, vol. 33.
- Zizhi Tongjian, vols. 266, 271, 274, 277, 279.
