= Feng Yun (Later Tang) =

Feng Yun (Chinese: 馮贇; died May 14, 934?) was an official of the Chinese Five Dynasties and Ten Kingdoms period state known as the Later Tang, serving both as chancellor and chief of staff (Shumishi) during the reigns of its second emperor Li Siyuan and Li Siyuan's son and successor Li Conghou.

== Background ==
It is not known when Feng Yun was born, but it is known that he was from Taiyuan. All that was recorded in history about his origins was that his father Feng Zhang—given variously as 馮璋 or 馮章—was the doorkeeper for Li Siyuan, the future Later Tang emperor. In Feng Yun's childhood, he was understanding and intelligent, and Li Siyuan liked him greatly. Later, when Li Siyuan served as a military governor (Jiedushi) under his adoptive brother Li Cunxu—unclear whether referring to a commission while Li Cunxu still used the Tang dynasty-bestowed title of Prince of Jin or after Li Cunxu claimed imperial title as emperor of Later Tang—Feng became his liaison officer at the imperial court.

== During Li Siyuan's reign ==
In 926, Li Cunxu was killed in a mutiny at then-Later Tang capital Luoyang. Li Siyuan, who had earlier rebelled against Li Cunxu, quickly arrived at Luoyang thereafter and claimed imperial title. Sometime after Li Siyuan took the throne, he made Feng Yun a protocol officer (中門使, Zhongmenshi) and director of palace affairs (宣徽使, Xuanhuishi).

In 928, when Li Siyuan made his then-oldest-surviving son Li Congrong the military governor of Hedong as well as the defender of its capital Taiyuan, he made Feng the deputy defender of Taiyuan, apparently in actual command. It was said that Li Congrong was arrogant in his youth and not paying proper attention to governance. Li Siyuan felt compelled to send, among his own associates, a man whom he believed Li Congrong respected (the man's identity is lost to history) to serve on Li Congrong's staff to try to positively influence him. The man informed Li Congrong that his younger brother Li Conghou had a much better reputation and that he should better himself so that his reputation can at least match Li Conghou's. Li Congrong was displeased by the advice, and informed this to his officer Yang Siquan (楊思權). Yang subsequently threatened the man, claiming that man was helping Li Conghou to overtake Li Congrong in succession. The man, in fear, informed the threat to Feng. Feng informed Li Siyuan, and Li Siyuan called Yang to his presence in order to disassociate him from Li Congrong, but, on Li Congrong's account, did not punish Yang. When Feng was subsequently recalled to the imperial government to again serve as the director of palace affairs, he warned the key officials in charge of government that Li Congrong had a harsh character and was acting frivolously, and needed good counsel. Shortly after, Li Congrong was recalled from Hedong to serve as the mayor of Henan Municipality (i.e., the Luoyang region) and the commander of the imperial guards, and Li Conghou, who previously held both titles, was made the military governor of Hedong, effectively swapping positions with Li Congrong.

In 930, Feng was made the defender of Taiyuan, and apparently also the military governor of Hedong. He later served as the military governor of Zhongwu Circuit (忠武, headquartered in modern Xuchang, Henan). In late 932, he was recalled from Zhongwu to again serve as director of palace affairs, and was also made the acting director of the three financial agencies (taxation, treasury, and salt and iron monopolies). In 933, Li Siyuan was prepared to make him a chancellor—usually, with the designation Tong Zhongshu Menxia Pingzhangshi (同中書門下平章事)—but as this would violate naming taboo for Feng (as his father was named Feng Zhang), Li Siyuan gave him the unusual designation Tong Zhongshu Menxia Erpin (同中書門下二品) as chancellor, and also made him full director of the three financial agencies.

By that time, Li Siyuan's chiefs of staff, Fan Yanguang and Zhao Yanshou, both were apprehensive of Li Congrong, and wanted to leave their posts to avoid confrontations with him. Despite Li Siyuan's displeasure (as he felt that they were abandoning him in his illness), he first allowed Zhao to leave to become the military governor of Xuanwu Circuit (宣武, headquartered in modern Kaifeng, Henan), replacing him with Zhu Hongzhao; and later also allowed Fan to leave to serve as the military governor of Chengde Circuit (成德, headquartered in modern Shijiazhuang, Hebei), replacing him with Feng.

Shortly after, Li Siyuan became deathly ill. Li Congrong wanted to forcibly enter the palace and take control, but his overtures to Zhu and Feng, asking them to go along with his plans, were rebuffed. He subsequently launched his troops and tried to seize control of the palace, but the imperial guards, under orders from Zhu and Feng, resisted and defeated Li Congrong, who was subsequently killed. Li Siyuan then decided to summon Li Conghou back from Tianxiong Circuit (天雄, headquartered in modern Handan, Hebei), effectively designating him as heir. Before Li Conghou could arrive, Li Siyuan died, and when Li Conghou arrived at Luoyang, Zhu and Feng supported him to be emperor.

== During Li Conghou's reign ==
As Zhu Hongzhao believed himself to be the person most instrumental to Li Conghou's enthronement, he tried to dominate the court scene. That caused him to eject Li Conghou's most trusted follower, Song Lingxun (宋令訓), out of Li Conghou's proximity, to be the prefect of Ci Prefecture (磁州, in modern Handan), despite Li Conghou's displeasure. He and Feng Yun similarly distrusted the imperial guard generals An Yanwei (安彥威) and Zhang Congbin (張從賓), and An and Zhang were sent out to be the military governors of Huguo and Zhangyi (彰義, headquartered in modern Pingliang, Gansu), respectively, and replaced with Zhu Hongshi (朱洪實) and Huangfu Yu (皇甫遇).

In spring 934, Li Conghou bestowed on Feng (as well as Zhu and Li Siyuan's son-in-law Shi Jingtang the military governor of Hedong) the greater chancellor title Zhongshu Ling (中書令). Feng, however, tried to decline it as he claimed to be unworthy of it, and so was instead given the slightly less prestigious title of Shizhong (侍中).

Meanwhile, Zhu and Feng also distrusted Li Conghou's older adoptive brother, Li Congke the Prince of Lu, who was then serving as the military governor of Fengxiang, and Shi Jingtang, as Li Congke and Shi had long served as generals under Li Siyuan and were respected by the imperial army. Due to their distrust of Li Congke, they ejected Li Congke's son Li Chongji (李重吉), who was at that time an officer in the imperial guard corps, to be the military prefect of Bo Prefecture (亳州, in modern Bozhou, Anhui), and ordered Li Congke's daughter Li Huiming (李惠明), who had previously become a Buddhist nun in a temple at Luoyang, to live in the palace so that they would have control over her. These actions caused Li Congke to become very apprehensive.

Shortly after, Zhu and Feng decided that they did not want to allow Shi to remain at Hedong for too long, and they also wanted to recall the eunuch Meng Hanqiong, who had been overseeing the governance of Tianxiong ever since Li Conghou was recalled from Tianxiong. They thus issued a series of orders as chiefs of staff, recalling Meng, and moving Fan Yanguang from Chengde Circuit to Tianxiong, Li Congke from Fengxiang to Hedong, and Shi from Hedong to Chengde. Despite the seriousness of these orders, no edicts were issued by the emperor. Li Congke, fearing that these moves were targeted toward him, rebelled. The imperial government sent the general Wang Sitong to command the operations against Fengxiang, and initially, it appeared that Wang would prevail, as his siege against Fengxiang's capital Fengxiang Municipality almost caused it to fall. However, at that time, a group of soldiers, led by Yang Siquan, defected to Li Congke, causing the imperial army, to collapse, with most of the army surrendering to Li Congke. Li Congke then took his army and headed for Luoyang, announcing that all who surrendered to him would be forgiven, except Zhu and Feng. Upon hearing this news, Li Conghou panicked and considered surrendering the throne to Li Congke, and Zhu and Feng were not sure how to react. The imperial guard general Kang Yicheng (康義誠), however, who was secretly considering defecting to Li Congke as well, offered to command the remaining imperial forces against Li Congke. Li Conghou agreed. (Meanwhile, Li Chongji and Li Huimin were executed.)

Even before Kang's army could meet Li Congke's advancing forces, however, the soldiers began to desert and surrender to Li Congke. Kang himself then did so as well. Upon hearing this, Li Conghou summoned Zhu to try to think of what to do next. Zhu, however, interpreted the command summoning him to be a sign that Li Conghou intended to punish him for his wrong advice, and committed suicide by jumping into a well. The imperial guard general An Congjin then killed Feng and delivered Zhu's and Feng's heads to Li Congke. (Li Conghou fled Luoyang, and was subsequently killed by Li Congke's emissaries after Shi also refused to support him.) Feng's mother had recently died, and both her body and his were abandoned on the road. Feng's wife and children were also killed, except a three-year-old son, who was hidden by his former subordinate Zhang Shousu (張守素).

== Notes and references ==
- New History of the Five Dynasties, vol. 27.
- Zizhi Tongjian, vols. 275, 276, 277, 278, 279.
