= Zhu Hongzhao =

Zhu Hongzhao (Chinese: 朱弘昭) (died May 14, 934) was a general of the Chinese Five Dynasties and Ten Kingdoms Period Later Tang state. He was a close associate of its second emperor. Li Siyuan and became particularly powerful during the short reign of Li Siyuan's son and successor Li Conghou while serving as chief of staff (Shumishi). Traditionally, he and fellow chief of staff Feng Yun were blamed for making inappropriate sensitive personnel movements that caused Li Conghou's adoptive brother Li Congke to be fearful and rebel, eventually leading to Li Conghou's being overthrown and Zhu's own death.

== Background ==
It is not known when Zhu Hongzhao was born, but it was known that he was from Taiyuan, either late in the Tang dynasty when it served as the capital for Hedong Circuit (河東), ruled by the major warlord Li Keyong, or early in the history of its successor state Jin, ruled successively by Li Keyong and his son Li Cunxu. His grandfather Zhu Wen (朱玟) and father Zhu Shuzong (朱叔宗) both served as officers of the guard corps for the Hedong headquarters. Zhu Hongzhao himself came to serve under Li Siyuan, an adoptive son of Li Keyong's and a major general.

== During Li Siyuan's reign ==
In 926, Li Cunxu, who had established a Later Tang as its emperor, was killed in a mutiny at the then-capital Luoyang. Li Siyuan, who had earlier rebelled against him, quickly arrived at Luoyang and claimed imperial title. Zhu Hongzhao became the overseer of the palace technicians (文思使). Later in the year, Li Siyuan's powerful chief of staff An Chonghui became suspicious of both Meng Zhixiang the military governor (Jiedushi) of Xichuan Circuit (西川, headquartered in modern Chengdu, Sichuan) and Dong Zhang the military governor of Dongchuan Circuit (東川, headquartered in modern Mianyang, Sichuan), as both Meng and Dong were trusted by Li Cunxu, and Meng had married Li Cunxu's biological cousin, and therefore was trying to find some way to curb Meng's and Dong's powers. As part of An's machinations, he sent the official Li Yan (李嚴) to Xichuan to serve as Meng's army monitor; and Zhu to Dongchuan to serve as Dong's deputy military governor. Meng, however, soon had Li Yan executed. Hearing of Li Yan's death, Zhu became fearful that Dong would kill him as well. He took the chance, when Dong happened to be asking him to go to Luoyang to make a report, to leave Dongchuan and stay at Luoyang. He became a general of the imperial guards and protocol officer (內客省使, Neikeshengshi). In 928, he was promoted to be a director of palace affairs (宣徽使, Xuanhuishi). That year, on an occasion when, after a major policy argument between Li Siyuan and An, Li Siyuan considered letting An retire, but Zhu pointed out that Li Siyuan had considered An a trusted adviser and should not abandon him on the basis of an argument, and therefore, Li Siyuan reconciled with An and continued to have An serve as chief of staff.

Later in the year, Li Siyuan launched a general campaign against the rebellious warlord Wang Du the military governor of Yiwu Circuit (義武, headquartered in modern Baoding, Hebei), under the overall command of the general Wang Yanqiu. Wang Yanqiu believed Yiwu's capital Ding Prefecture (定州) to have strong defenses and therefore would be difficult to attack directly; rather, he wanted to surround the city and put it under siege, to drain out the city's food supplies. Both Zhu and Zhang Qianzhao (張虔昭), serving under Wang Yanqiu, claimed that Wang Yanqiu was being cowardly, and Li Siyuan, believing them, ordered Wang Yanqiu to attack. Wang Yanqiu's initial attacks, under such orders, resulted in heavy casualties, and he was then able to persuade Li Siyuan to allow him to resume his strategy of starving out the Ding Prefecture defense. He was eventually able to capture Ding in 929, and Wang Du committed suicide.

Also in 929, Li Siyuan sacrificed to heaven and earth south of Luoyang, to signify his status as emperor. During the ceremony, Zhu stayed at the palace to keep it safe. After the ceremony, Li Siyuan gave him the title of acting Taifu (太傅), and made him the military governor of Fengxiang Circuit (鳳翔, headquartered in modern Baoji, Shaanxi).

In 930, Meng and Dong, fearful of An's suspicions against them, had allied with each other and rebelled against Li Siyuan's rule. Li Siyuan sent his son-in-law Shi Jingtang to command the operations against the two circuits, but the operations stalled against the two circuits' defenses. An offered to head to the front to review the operations, and Li Siyuan agreed. On the way to the front, An stopped at Fengxiang. Zhu personally came out of the city to bow to him, and housed An inside his own headquarters. He also had his wife come out to bow to An and to present food to An. An, touched by the gesture, stated, "Libelers had repeatedly accused me, and I almost could not escape. It was only because His Imperial Majesty saw the situation clearly that I still have my clan." After An departed Fengxiang for the front, Zhu immediately submitted a report to Li Siyuan, accusing An of showing anger to the emperor and stating that he was fearful that when An arrived at the front, he would seize command of the army from Shi. He also sent messengers ahead of An, informing Shi of the same thing. Shi, in fear, also sent messengers to Luoyang asking Li Siyuan to recall An. Li Siyuan therefore did so. When An received the recall and headed back to Luoyang, he went first to Fengxiang, but Zhu, this time, refused to receive him into the city at all, causing An, in fear, to try to head to Luoyang as quickly as possible. Li Siyuan, however, gave him no chance to return to Luoyang, but instead commissioned him as the military governor of Huguo Circuit (護國, headquartered in modern Yuncheng, Shanxi) without allowing him to return, and subsequently had him killed.

Shortly after An's death, Zhu was recalled to Luoyang to again serve as the director of palace affairs. In 932, he was made the military governor of Shannan East Circuit (山南東道, headquartered in modern Xiangyang, Hubei), replacing Kang Yicheng (康義誠).

By 933, Li Siyuan's oldest surviving son, Li Congrong the Prince of Wei, who was generally considered Li Siyuan's likely heir, had made all of the high level officials fearful of him due to his arrogant and violent ways. Then-chiefs of staff, Fan Yanguang and Zhao Yanshou, whom Li Congrong had threatened repeatedly, in particular, did not want to remain chiefs of staff, and repeatedly requested to be sent out to the circuits. Li Siyuan was initially resistant, believing that they were abandoning him, but eventually relented, allowing Zhao to become military governor of Xuanwu Circuit (宣武, headquartered in modern Kaifeng, Henan) and naming Zhu to replace him. Zhu initially tried to decline the post as well, but Li Siyuan angrily stated, "If people like you all refuse to be by my side, what use was it for me to feed you?" Zhu did not dare to decline further, so took his office. Li Siyuan also bestowed the chancellor designation Tong Zhongshu Menxia Pingzhangshi (同中書門下平章事) on him.

Shortly after Zhu became chief of staff, Feng Yun replaced Fan as the other chief of staff. Thereafter, Li Siyuan became extremely ill, but had not yet named an heir. Li Congrong wanted to force his way inside the palace so that the succession would not be diverted from him, but when he suggested the idea to Zhu and Feng, both were resistant of him. Li Congrong therefore decided to fight them with his army. The imperial guards, however, under orders from Zhu and Feng, as well as Kang (who was serving as a commanding general at that time) and the eunuch Meng Hanqiong, resisted and defeated Li Congrong's army. Li Congrong was subsequently killed. Li Siyuan subsequently agreed to summon Li Congrong's younger brother Li Conghou the Prince of Song, who was then serving as the military governor of Tianxiong Circuit (天雄, headquartered in modern Handan, Hebei), but died before Li Conghou reached Luoyang. When Li Conghou reached Luoyang, the high-level officials, including Zhu, supported him to be emperor.

== During Li Conghou's reign ==
As Zhu Hongzhao believed himself to be the person most instrumental to Li Conghou's enthronement, he tried to dominate the court scene. That caused him to eject Li Conghou's most trusted follower, Song Lingxun (宋令訓), out of Li Conghou's proximity, to be the prefect of Ci Prefecture (磁州, in modern Handan), despite Li Conghou's displeasure. He and Feng Yun similarly distrusted the imperial guard generals An Yanwei (安彥威) and Zhang Congbin (張從賓), and An and Zhang were sent out to be the military governors of Huguo and Zhangyi (彰義, headquartered in modern Pingliang, Gansu), respectively, and replaced with Zhu Hongshi (朱洪實) and Huangfu Yu (皇甫遇).

In spring 934, Zhu received the greater chancellor title Zhongshu Ling (中書令).

Meanwhile, Zhu and Feng also distrusted Li Conghou's older adoptive brother, Li Congke the Prince of Lu, who was then serving as the military governor of Fengxiang, and Shi Jingtang, who was then serving as the military governor of Hedong, as Li Congke and Shi had long served as generals under Li Siyuan and were respected by the imperial army. Due to their distrust of Li Congke, they ejected Li Congke's son Li Chongji (李重吉), who was at that time an officer in the imperial guard corps, to be the military prefect of Bo Prefecture (亳州, in modern Bozhou, Anhui), and ordered Li Congke's daughter Li Huiming (李惠明), who had previously become a Buddhist nun in a temple at Luoyang, to live in the palace so that they would have control over her. These actions caused Li Congke to become very apprehensive.

Shortly after, Zhu and Feng decided that they did not want to allow Shi to remain at Hedong for too long, and they also wanted to recall Meng Hanqiong, who had been overseeing the governance of Tianxiong ever since Li Conghou was recalled from Tianxiong. They thus issued a series of orders as chiefs of staff, recalling Meng, and moving Fan Yanguang from Chengde Circuit (成德, headquartered in modern Shijiazhuang, Hebei) to Tianxiong, Li Congke from Fengxiang to Hedong, and Shi from Hedong to Chengde. Despite the seriousness of these orders, no edicts were issued by the emperor. Li Congke, fearing that these moves were targeted toward him, rebelled. The imperial government sent the general Wang Sitong to command the operations against Fengxiang, and initially, it appeared that Wang would prevail, as his siege against Fengxiang's capital Fengxiang Municipality almost caused it to fall. However, at that time, a group of soldiers, led by the officer Yang Siquan (楊思權), defected to Li Congke, causing the imperial army, to collapse, with most of the army surrendering to Li Congke. Li Congke then took his army and headed for Luoyang, announcing that all who surrendered to him would be forgiven, except Zhu and Feng. Upon hearing this news, Li Conghou panicked and considered surrendering the throne to Li Congke, and Zhu and Feng were not sure how to react. Kang Yicheng, however, who was secretly considering defecting to Li Congke as well, offered to command the remaining imperial forces against Li Congke. Li Conghou agreed. (Meanwhile, Li Chongji and Li Huimin were executed.)

Even before Kang's army could meet Li Congke's advancing forces, however, the soldiers began to desert and surrender to Li Congke. Kang himself then did so as well. Upon hearing this, Li Conghou summoned Zhu to try to think of what to do next. Zhu, however, interpreted the command summoning him to be a sign that Li Conghou intended to punish him for his wrong advice, and committed suicide by jumping into a well. The imperial guard general An Congjin killed Feng and delivered Zhu's and Feng's heads to Li Congke. (Li Conghou fled Luoyang, and was subsequently killed by Li Congke's emissaries after Shi also refused to support him.)

== Notes and references ==
- History of the Five Dynasties, vol. 66.
- New History of the Five Dynasties, vol. 27.
- Zizhi Tongjian, vols. 275, 276, 277, 278, 279.
