= Sidney D. Gamble =

American sociologist and photographer of China

Sidney David Gamble
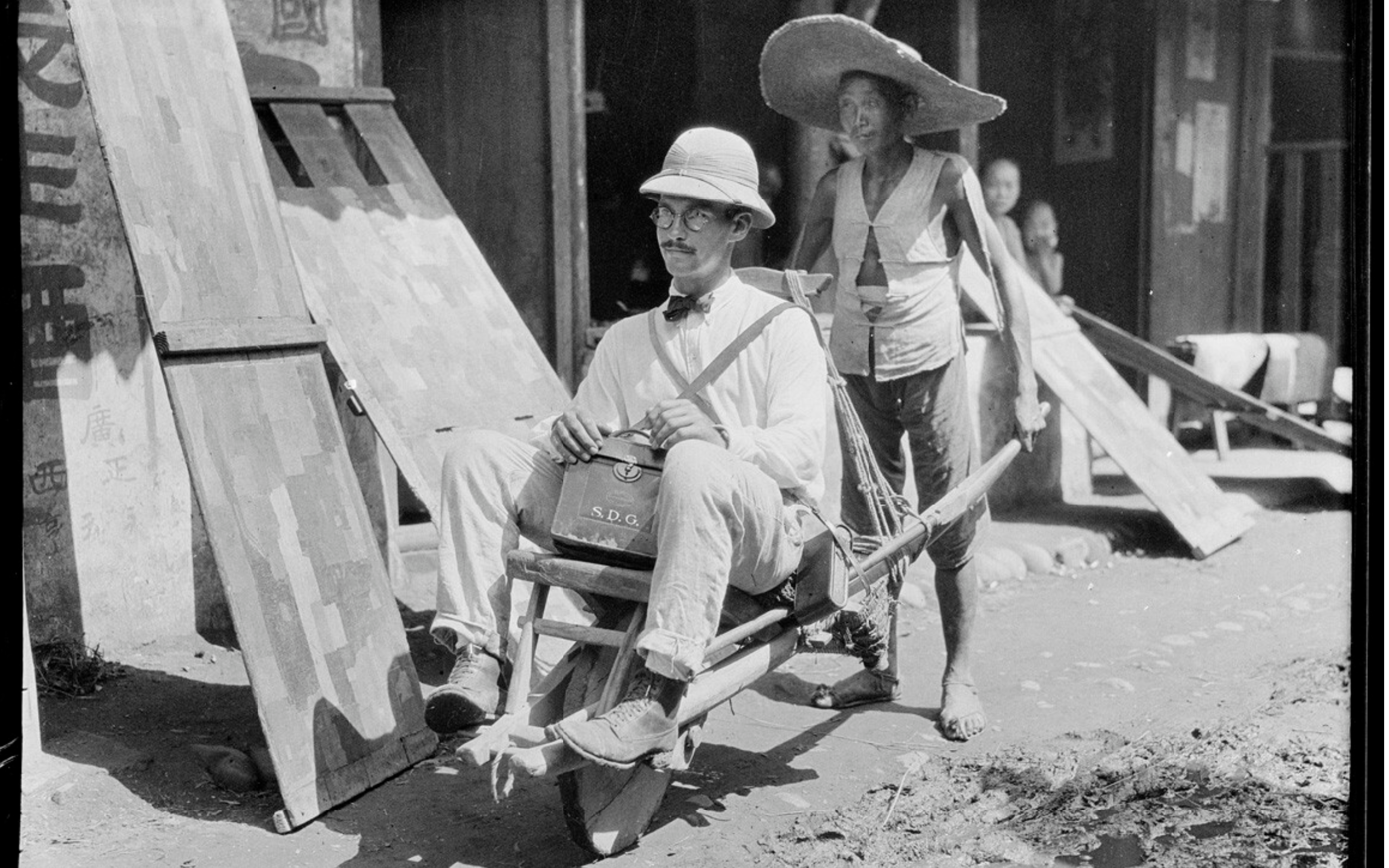
- Sidney David Gamble in wheelbarrow at Xindu, Sichuan, 1917.
- Born: July 12, 1890; Cincinnati, Ohio, United States
- Died: March 29, 1968 (aged 77); New York, United States
- Education: Miss Sattler's School; University School, Cincinnati; Thacher School, Ojai; Princeton University; University of California, Berkeley
- Occupations: Sociologist, YMCA worker
- Spouse: Elizabeth Pritchard Gamble (née Lowe)
- Parents: David Berry Gamble (father); Mary Gamble (née Huggins) (mother)

Sidney David Gamble (July 12, 1890 – March 29, 1968) was born in Cincinnati, Ohio, to David Berry and Mary Huggins Gamble; grandson of James Gamble, who, with William Procter, founded Procter & Gamble in 1837. in 1912 he graduated magna cum laude from Princeton University with a Bachelor of Literature degree and was elected to Phi Beta Kappa. He visited China for four extended periods, 1908, 1917–1919, 1924–27, and 1931–1932, doing Christian social work for YMCA and conducting social surveys. He is now best known for his remarkable and extensive photographs of Peking and North China. He also took numerous photographs of West China (i.e. Sichuan).

At his death he left his widow, the former Elizabeth Lowe, four children, Catherine, Louise, David, and Anne, and ten grandchildren. His daughter, Catherine G. Curran, in 1986 established the Sidney D. Gamble Foundation, and the Sidney D. Gamble Lectures are given annually in Pasadena, California.

== Social survey and photography in China ==
Gamble first toured in 1908, accompanying his parents, then after graduating from Princeton in 1912, studied labor and industrial economics at University of California, Berkeley, spending six months on a fellowship working at a reform school for delinquent boys. At this time, he built the house which became known as the Sidney D. Gamble House.

In 1917, he joined the work of Princeton-in-Peking and Peking YMCA where his Princeton friend John Stewart Burgess invited him to do the surveys which resulted in Peking: A Social Survey, which included more than fifty photographs. In 1919 Gamble was on hand to capture dramatic photographs of the May Fourth student demonstrations. The motto of the May Fourth Movement, "To save China through science and democracy," and the missionary ideal of "Saving China through Christianity" for a time seemed to be united. When he returned with his bride, Elizabeth Lowe, to China in 1924, he used his family resources to hire a team of Chinese researchers to survey 283 families. The book was published in 1933 as How Chinese Families Live in Peiping (as Peking was then called). In 1926, Gamble traveled for three weeks in the Soviet Union with Sherwood Eddy, a longtime mentor.

As China became more and more inflamed by patriotic agitation and warlord fighting, he found hope in the Ting Hsien Experiment (Ding Xian Experiment) in Rural Reconstruction conducted by James Yen’s Mass Education Movement. In 1931-32 Gamble traveled to China for the fourth and final time to organize the surveys which he used for three more detailed volumes, Ting Hsien: A North China Rural Community (1954) and North China Villages (1963). Chinese Village Plays, published in 1970, after his death, give translations based on unique transcriptions of now lost village yang ko plays, which differ from the later dances.

Jonathan Spence concludes of Gamble that his "findings were open-minded, clear headed, methodologically intelligent (though not always beyond criticism by scholars of different views), startlingly imaginative, and -- when presented in photographic form -- vigorous, ebullient, unsentimental, and starkly, yet never cruelly, illustrative of the deep and real suffering that lay at the heart of China's long revolution."

== Later career ==
After his return to the United States, he was elected member of the National Council of YMCA, became Treasurer, Vice Chairman, Chairman, and President Emeritus of Church World Service; Chairman of the Executive Committee of the Josiah Macy Jr. Foundation; President and Honorary Chairman of Princeton-in-Asia.

== References and further reading ==
- Xing, Wenjun (1 January 1992), "Social gospel, social economics, and YMCA: Sidney D. Gamble and Princeton-in-Peking", Electronic Doctoral Dissertations for UMass Amherst. Paper AAI9305919: 1–339
- Jonathan Spence, "Sidney Gamble's China," in Spence, Chinese Roundabout: Essays in History and Culture (Norton, 1992 ISBN 978-0-393-30994-2): 51–67.
- Zhou, Luo (2020). "Copyright: The Case of the Sidney D. Gamble Photographs at the Duke University Libraries". Journal of East Asian Libraries (170): 3.
- Zhou, Luo (2013). "Photo Essay: Chinese Leisure Scenes through Sidney Gamble's Camera". Cross Currents (8): 115–133.
- Eyster, James Parry (1987). "A Princetonian in Asia: Sidney Gamble's Social Surveys in China, 1918-1934". The Princeton University Library Chronicle. 48 (3): 253–270. doi:10.2307/26410046. JSTOR 264110046.

== Works ==
- Sidney D. Gamble, with the assistance of John Stewart Burgess, Peking, a Social Survey Conducted under the Auspices of the Princeton University Center in China and the Peking Young Men's Christian Association (London: H. Milford, 1921). 538p. Foreword by G. Sherwood Eddy and Robert A. Woods.
- Sidney D. Gamble, Ho-chên Wang, Jên-ho Liang, How Chinese Families Live in Peiping; a Study of the Income and Expenditure of 283 Chinese Families (New York, London: Funk & Wagnalls Company, 1933). 348 pp 33025920. Field work in charge of Wang Ho-ch*en and Liang Jen-ho.
- S. D. Gamble, "The Disappearance of Foot-Binding in Tinghsien," The American Journal of Sociology 49.2 (1943).
- Sidney D. Gamble, Foreword by Y.C. James Yen. Field work directed by Franklin Ching-han Lee. Ting Hsien, a North China Rural Community (New York: International Secretariat Institute of Pacific Relations, 1954; rpr Stanford University Press, 1968). xxv, 472p. 54009009
- Sidney D. Gamble,North China Villages; Social, Political, and Economic Activities before 1933 (Berkeley: University of California Press, 1963). x, 352p. ISBN 978-0-520-00452-8.
- Sidney D. Gamble, Chinese Village Plays from the Ting Hsien Region (Yang Ke Hsüan); a Collection of Forty-Eight Chinese Rural Plays as Staged by Villagers from Ting Hsien in Northern China (Amsterdam,: APA-Philo Press, 1970). xxix, 762 p.p. ISBN 90-6022-400-0; ISBN 978-90-6022-400-7. Translated from the Chinese by various scholars after the original recordings and edited with a critical introd. and explanatory notes by Sidney D. Gamble.

== Later publications, exhibits ==
- China Between Revolutions: Photographs by Sidney D. Gamble, 1917-1927 (Sidney D. Gamble Foundation )Introduction by Jonathan D Spence, May Wu, Editor. ISBN 978-0-9622826-0-7
- Sidney D. Gamble's China, 1917-1932: Photographs of the Land and Its People (Washington, D.C.: Alvin Rosenbaum Projects, Inc., 1988). 191 pp. ISBN 978-0-87491-916-5 forewords by John Hersey and L. Carrington Goodrich; introduction by Jonathan D. Spence.
