= PROLINNOVA =

Promoting Local innovation in ecologically oriented agriculture and NRM, known as PROLINNOVA, is an NGO-initiated international learning network to promote local innovation in ecologically oriented agriculture and Natural resource management. It is a "Global Partnership Programme" under the umbrella of the Global Forum on Agricultural Research (GFAR). The focus of PROLINNOVA is on recognising the dynamics of indigenous knowledge and enhancing capacities of farmers (including forest dwellers, pastoralists and fisherfolk) to adjust to change – to develop their own site-appropriate systems and institutions of resource management so as to gain food security, sustain their livelihoods and safeguard the environment. The essence of sustainability lies in the capacity to adapt.

The programme builds on and scales up farmer-based approaches to development that start with discovering how farmers do informal experimentation to develop and test new ideas for better use of natural resources. Understanding the rationale behind local innovation transforms how research and extension agents view local people. This experience stimulates interest on both sides to enter into joint action. Local ideas are further developed in a participatory process that integrates IK and scientific knowledge. Joint action and analysis lead to mutual learning.

There are 19 multi-stakeholder country platforms involved in the PROLINNOVA network: Bolivia, Peru, Ecuador, Kenya, Mozambique, Mali, Senegal, Ethiopia, Nigeria, Ghana, Uganda, Nepal, Cambodia, South Africa, Nigeria, Niger, Sudan, Cameroon and Tanzania. Prolinnova country-level activities are supported by an international support team, composed of ETC-AgriCulture (Netherlands), International Institute of Rural Reconstruction (IIRR, Philippines) and IED Afrique (Senegal).

== PROLINNOVA Cambodia ==
Cambodia was involved at the inception phase and has been a member of Prolinnova since 2004. There are 20 institutions participating across the country, including Cambodia's largest agricultural NGO, CEDAC.

== See also ==
- Agerskovgruppen
- FAO GM Foods Platform
