= Yangge =

Type of dance

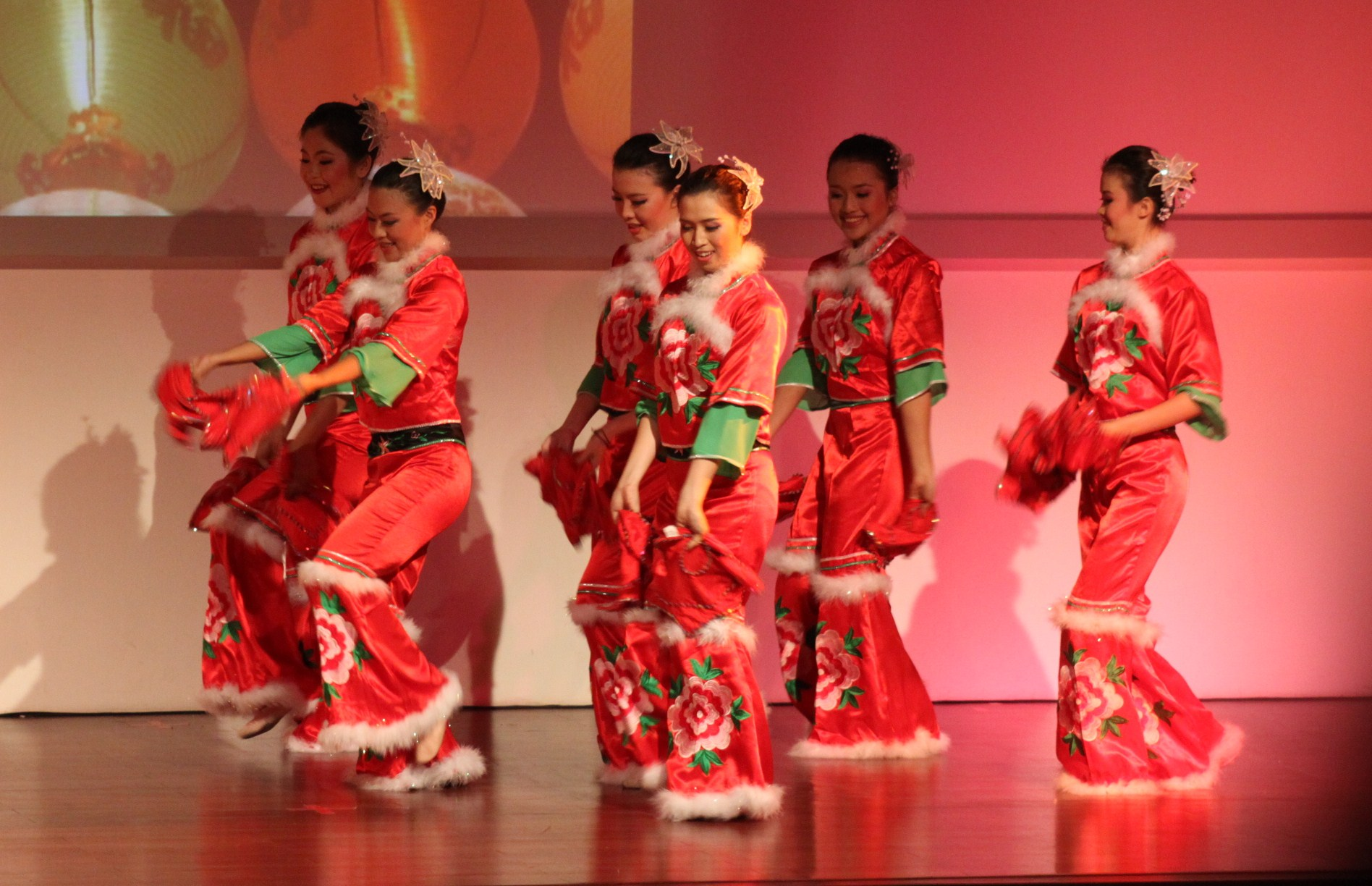
Traditional Yangge dance performance by the Dream Butterfly Dance Group (蝶梦舞团) at Binus University

Yangge (Chinese: 秧歌; pinyin: yānggē; lit. 'Rice Sprout Song') is a form of Chinese folk dance developed from a dance known in the Song dynasty as Village Music (村田樂). It is very popular in northern China and is one of the most representative form of folk arts. It is popular in both the countryside and cities in northern China. It is especially popular among older people. Crowds of people will go out into the street in the evening and dance together in a line or a circle formation.

Some dancers dress up in red, green, or other colorful costumes, and typically use a red silk ribbon around the waist. They will swing their bodies to music played by drum, trumpet, and gong. More people will join in as they see Yang Ge going on and dance along. Some dancers use props like the waistdrum, dancing fan, fake donkey, or litter. In different areas Yangge is performed in different styles, but all types express happiness.

In the 1940s, the Chinese Communist Party launched the new yangge movement where the dance was adopted as a means of rallying village support. The dance was simplified into a pattern of three-quick-steps forward, one-step-backward, pause and repeat. This version of the dance incorporated socialist elements, for example the leader of the dance group would hold a sickle instead of umbrella, and it is also known as "Struggle Yangge" (斗争秧歌; Dòuzhēng yānggē) or "reform yangge".

== Types ==
There are two major types of yangge, one is Stilt Yangge which is performed on stilts, the other is Ground Yangge which is more common and is performed without stilts. Another version of the yangge is the village play, an anthology of which was published by Sidney D. Gamble in 1970, based on transcriptions made by Li Jinghan as part of the Ding Xian Experiment's surveys in the 1930s.

The Yangge drama or Yangge opera (秧歌剧) usually consists of a quatrain of seven stanzas or long and short sentences. An example is the founding piece of the China National Opera when it was founded in Yan'an in 1942, which was with a performance of a Yangge drama Brothers and Sisters Opening up the Wasteland (兄妹开荒). The Yangko owed something to normal spoken drama (huaju), but with dance, and songs added.

== Struggle (Reform) Yangge and the Chinese Communist Party ==
Struggle Yangge in Beijing

The new struggle yangge had roots in the traditional folk rite yangge that was performed in the rural parts of Northern China prior to the Japanese invasion of 1937. The folk rite was performative and was often associated with New Year’s celebrations, incorporating spirited dance, garish costumes, and loud music. The dance troupe was led by a leader dancer known as santou (umbrella head) and consisted of dancers, ranging from a few dozen to more than one hundred dancers. Simple plays were enacted during the dance, mostly about everyday life in rural China. The songs that accompanied the folk rite were conversations between young men and women about love or congratulatory greetings, and the swinging movements of the dances were generally sexually suggestive.

During the Republican era, Nationalist officials and rural reformers such as the Mass Education Movement pushed for various reform initiatives that sought to use yangge performances to inculcate their desired objectives of abolishing certain traditional customs and strengthening national identity.

In Yan'an, the Yangge Movement (late 1942 to 1946) adapted yangge to incorporate socialist themes. The Lu Xun Academy of Arts had a significant role in the movement.

The struggle yangge that was popularized by the Chinese Communist Party (CCP) in urban settings from 1949 to 1951 was a political instrument used to communicate the socialist ideals of the CCP to the people. In fact, the dance limited artistic freedom and improvisation with specific guidelines that the dance must adhere to including: prohibition of male performers to dress as women; elimination of any flirtatious or erotic moves; forbiddened the portrayal of ghosts, deities, Buddhist monks, and Daoist priests (elements that were common in rural yangge); no vulgarity or negative portrayals of the working class in the dances, and dancers were not permitted to wear excessive makeup. The power of the struggle yangge came from the dance’s simplicity and visibility, aimed at reaching a larger and wider audience. Unlike rural yangge with its complex and vast dance patterns, struggle yangge utilized simpler dance moves such as Double Cabbage Heart (spiraling move) and Dragon Waves Its Tail (snakelike movement) to, as one yangge dancer puts it, “to express an exuberant mood and to invite as many people as possible to share in the joy”.

Struggle yangge’s purpose was to tell a positive story about the CCP and the People’s Liberation Army. The story was told in three musical performances, consisting of song and dance, with the production of these performances in chronological order to achieve maximum impact. The first was The Great Yangge of the Celebration of Liberation (庆祝解放大秧歌), which told the war of liberation from the Nationalists. The second piece was The Great Musical of Long Live the People’s Victory (人民胜利万岁大歌舞), which illustrated the remembrance of the people’s victory in the revolution. The last musical was The Great Yangge of Building the Motherland (建设祖国大秧歌), which depicts the construction of a new socialist country led by the CCP. The production of each performance was elaborate and complex, with shows lasting four to five hours.

== Regional variations ==
=== North Shaanxi ===
The dance may be in large groups of a dozen to a hundred people, or in two or three-person groups. The dancers move from location to location, visiting different parts of the town. The leader of the procession of dancers is called the santou or "Umbrella" who wields an umbrella to lead the movement of the group. He also sings, usually improvised, while the others will repeat his last line. Various characters may appear in the procession, such as the two comic characters Big-Headed Monk and Liu Cui (柳翠), and the Eight Immortals. The procession first follows the santou in a single file to form a large simple circle, and later then forms other more intricate patterns.

=== Shandong ===
The Shandong yangge is thought to be the purest forms of yangge. There are three major types of yangge in the Shandong province, the Haiyang yangge, Jiaozhou yangge, and the guzi (鼓子 "drum") yangge. In guzi yangge each dancer takes one of five roles - "Umbrella", "Drum", "Stick", "Flower", "Clown" - the first three are named after the props the dancer holds, while the fourth refers to a female dancer.

=== Liaoning ===
In Liaoning and Beijing, a popular form is the stilt yangge where the dancers perform on stilts. There are many types of stilt yangge, for example "Jietang" is a group dance performed in the street; "Jiaxiang" involves the formation of a pyramid of different poses; "Dachang" is group dance done in a large open air space; and "Xiaochang" characterized by its love-story plot.

=== Northeast China ===
The performers of Manchurian Yangge in Northeast China usually wear traditional Manchu clothes of the area. The movement is free and brisk, imitating the valor of a tribe excelling in horsemanship and marksmanship.

== See also ==
- Dance of China
- List of ethnic, regional, and folk dances sorted by origin
- Pungmul & Samul nori of the ethnic Koreans in China
- Square dancing (China)
