= International Institute of Rural Reconstruction =

Philippine non-profit organization

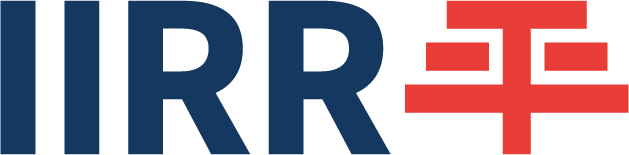
- Abbreviation: IIRR
- Formation: 1960; 66 years ago
- Founder: Y.C. James Yen
- Founded at: Silang, Cavite, Philippines
- Type: NGO
- Purpose: Rural development
- Headquarters: New York City, USA
- Location: Silang, Cavite, Philippines
- President: Peter Williams
- Website: iirr.org

The International Institute of Rural Reconstruction, or IIRR, is an international non-governmental organization working in rural development. The mission of the organization is to "empower rural people to build resilient communities and attain socioeconomic equity through creative and community-led action."

IIRR has held A-1 roster consultative status with the United Nations Economic and Social Council since 1979.

== History ==
IIRR emerged from the Rural Reconstruction Movement in which the organization's founder, Y. C. James Yen, was a key figure.

The Chinese National Association of the Mass Education Movement was launched in 1923 by Y.C. James Yen and several others in China, with the aim of societal reform through mass education. The movement opened schools in rural areas and reached over 20 provinces.

After World War II, Yen partnered with UNESCO to vaccinate the population of rural China and educate them about disease prevention practices. Instrumental in the founding of the Sino-American Joint Commission on Rural Reconstruction in 1948 and the Philippine Rural Reconstruction Movement in 1952, Yen dedicated his life to the mission of rural reconstruction.

Yen founded IIRR in the Philippines in 1960.

== Work ==
Officers of IIRR, 2024

IIRR's work is centered around the organization's 'five pillars': food systems, economic empowerment, education, environment, and health. IIRR has worked on projects in over 50 countries.

=== Food systems ===
Working within rural communities, IIRR has undertaken food security projects, including those focused on climate resilience in Cambodia, the Philippines, Bangladesh, Ethiopia, Guatemala, India, Indonesia, Kenya, Laos, Nepal, Thailand, and Uganda. In collaboration with the United Nations Development Program and IBSA, IIRR has worked to tackle food insecurity in the Karamoja region while empowering women through women-led farming initiatives. Beyond food security, IIRR works on agricultural development generally, including alongside USAID in Ethiopia.

=== Economic empowerment ===
IIRR is involved with the Project for Financial Inclusion in Rural Areas (PROFIRA) launched by the government of Uganda in 2014. This initiative aims to increase accessibility to credit for those living in rural areas. Moreover, IIRR is an active partner on the CLI-MARK (Climate, Livestock, and Markets) project. This project is equipping communities in Ethiopia with the tools to improve livestock value chains and adopt better business practices. In Guinayangan Municipality, Philippines, IIRR collaborated with the local government to economically empower the local community and encourage biodiverse fruit production through the fruit tree distribution program.

=== Education ===
The organization also has several educational projects, such as one targeted at pastoral communities in East Africa. In 2023, IIRR alongside ICIPE and Mastercard launched a program to train 1 million unemployed young people in Ethiopia in beekeeping. IIRR has also worked with the government of the United Kingdom to increase school attendance and retention in Arid and Semi-Arid areas in Kenya.

=== Environment ===
In the Philippines, IIRR has worked on the restoration of peatland damaged by agriculture and natural disasters. IIRR is working to promote climate resilience within vulnerable populations through promoting risk reduction technologies. For example, in collaboration with CGIAR, IIRR is supporting the utilization of climate risk mapping technologies in the Philippines.

=== Health ===
IRR works to improve nutrition amongst rural communities through the implementation of the integrated nutrition model in schools. Moreover, in collaboration with UN women, IIRR's 'Stop Violence against Women and Girls in Samburu, Marsabit and Isiolo Counties in Northern Kenya' project sought to employ community-based engagement to promote gender equality as well as women's sexual and reproductive health.

== Headquarters and offices ==
IIRR’s legal headquarters is located in New York City, while the organization’s operational headquarters is located in the Philippines. Additionally, the organization has country and regional offices in Cambodia, Ethiopia, Kenya, Myanmar, South Sudan and Uganda.

== See also ==
- Philippine Rural Reconstruction Movement
- PROLINNOVA
