= Dai Jinhua =

Chinese feminist cultural critic (born 1959)

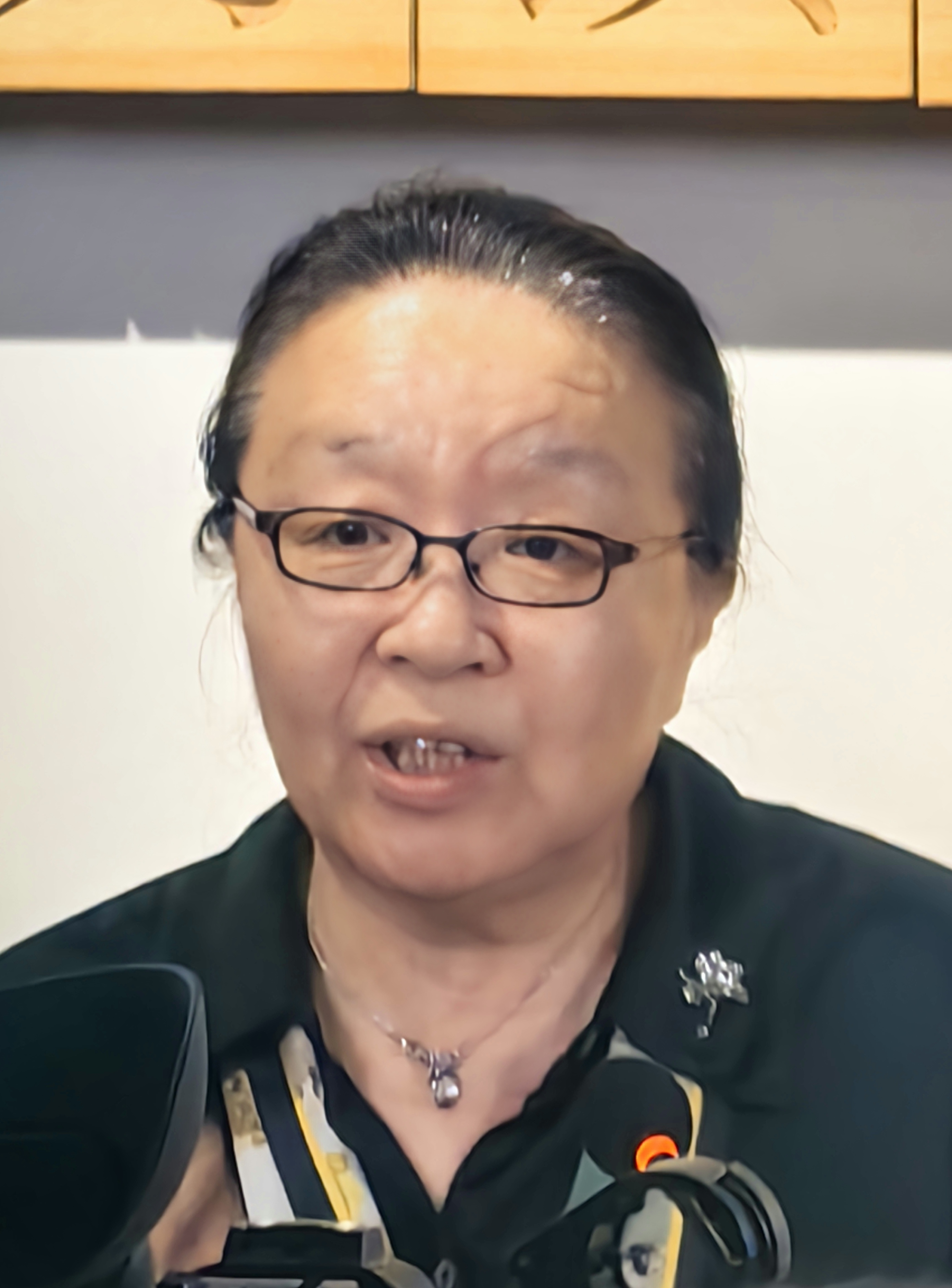
- Born: 1959 (age 66–67)
- Awards: Shanghai Film Critics Awards, for Contributions to Film Theory (2017)

Academic background
- Education: Peking University

Academic work
- Institutions: Peking University
- Main interests: Film studies and gender studies
- Notable works: Cinema and Desire

Chinese name
- Simplified Chinese: 戴锦华

Dai Jinhua (Chinese: 戴锦华) is a Chinese feminist cultural critic. She is a professor in the Institute of Comparative Literature and Culture, Peking University. Her research interests include popular culture, film studies, and gender studies.

She taught at the Beijing Film Academy before assuming professorship at the Institute of Comparative Literature and Culture and directorship of the Center for Film and Cultural Studies at Peking University. She has long been engaged in the New Rural Reconstruction Movement and the Green movement. She is the author of more than ten scholarly monographs. Her works have been translated into English, French, German, Italian, Spanish, Japanese, and Korean. Her literary, film and TV commentary have addressed an expanding audience in China, Taiwan and Hong Kong over the last decades.

== Ideas ==
Dai is known for her early critique of the self-Orientalizing tendencies of filmmakers considered to be part of China's Fifth Generation such as Zhang Yimou and Chen Kaige. According to Dai, the historical imagery of their films tend to produce "oriental landscapes" that are oriented towards Western reception and prize recognition.

In addition, she has written extensively about the representation of women in Chinese film. In one of her most well-known critiques, she examines the trope of gender-crossing through the myth of Hua Mulan (a woman who disguises herself as a man to join the army as a substitute for her father) in a series of women-centered films such as New Women, and revolutionary operas such as White-Haired Girl and the Red Detachment of Women. For her, this myth usefully indicates how drag, which can be subversive of patriarchal systems, can also reinforce them.

Dai's work is generally critical of capitalism—she has been associated with the New Left. One of her analyses of consumerism in China traces the transformation of the word guangchang, which referred to the politicized space of the public square, but now is often used in the names of shopping centers. She has also described the market for souvenirs and historical tours related to the Maoist era as "imaginary nostalgia" that acts as a "substitute for historical consciousness".

== Biography ==
- 1959 Born in Beijing
- 1982 Graduated from Department of Chinese Literature, Peking University
- 1987-1992 Lecturer, Department of Filmic Literature, Beijing Film Institute
- 1992-1993 Associate professor, Department of Filmic Literature, Beijing Film Institute
- 1993-1997 Associate professor, Institute of Comparative Literature and Culture, Peking University
- 1996–present adjunct professor, Ohio State University (graduate program)
- 1997–present Professor, Department of Chinese Literature and Language, Institute of Comparative Literature and Culture, Peking University
- 2009–present adjunct professor, Department of Cultural Studies, Lingnan University

== Writings ==
- 《蒙面骑士–墨西哥副司令马科斯文集》(Masked Rider: The Writings of Subcomandante Marcos), 2006
- 《性别中国》(Gendering China). Taipei: Rye Field, 2005.
- Cinema and Desire: Feminist Marxism and Cultural Politics in the Work of Dai Jinhua, eds. Jing Wang and Tani E. Barlow. London: Verso, 2002.
- 《镜城突围》(Breaking Out of the Mirror City). Beijing: China National Press, 1995.
- 《隐形书写–90年代中国文化研究》(Invisible Writing: Cultural Studies in China in the 1990s), Nanjing: Jiangsu People's Press, 1999.
- 《犹在镜中–戴锦华访谈录》(Through a Glass Darkly: Interviews with Dai Jinhua), Beijing: Knowledge Press, 1999. Translated into Korean, Seoul: BreenBee, 2009.

== Bibliography ==
- Resident Fellows - Dai Jinhua. Townsend Center for the Humanities at University of California, Berkeley. Accessed 2011-02-01.
- Biographical dictionary of Chinese women, Volume 2. Lily Xiao Hong Lee, Clara Wing-chung Ho. M.E. Sharpe, 2003. pp.123-125.
