= The Call (Hersey novel) =

1985 novel by John Hersey

- First edition
- Author: John Hersey
- Cover artist: Sara Eisenman
- Subject: Protestant missions in China
- Genre: Historical novel
- Publisher: Alfred A. Knopf
- Publication place: United States

The Call is a novel published in 1985 by the American writer John Hersey. The novel, which is in the form of a fictionalized biography with letters and excerpts from Treadup's journal, presents the experience of David Treadup, an American Protestant missionary in China during the first half of the twentieth century. As the novel progresses, and China undergoes Japanese invasion and communist revolution, Treadup reconsiders whether his efforts to help China were useful and questions the usefulness of the Christian mission. Hersey based Treadup on a composite of six historical China missionaries, including his own father. Other historical figures appear, sometimes under their own names.

== Plot ==
The novel mixes narrative, excerpts from Treadup's journal, letters written by Treadup and his wife. and excerpts from "The Search," an extended memoir which he wrote while in a Japanese internment camp during the Second Sino-Japanese War. This organization allows Hersey to show what Treadup thought at the time of events and then what he thought about them up to forty years later.

The first section of the novel describes Treadup's ancestors, a long-established Anglo-Saxon family. David himself was born 1878 in western New York, then graduated from Syracuse University. The call to missionary work comes in his last year in college, when he hears a visiting minister, John R. Mott, who is proselytizing for the Student Volunteer Movement For Foreign Missions, a liberal evangelistic organization. Treadup volunteers to go to China for the YMCA, but the Y will not let him go if he does not have a wife. Treadup arranges with Emily Kean to join him in China a year later, and after a further year they are married. When he arrives in Tianjin, or Tientsin as it was then spelled, Treadup joins the educational and scientific work of the YMCA.

At the 1907 China Centenary Missionary Conference in Shanghai, Treadup takes part in the debate between the older evangelists, who insist that their only mission is to spread the gospel, and the newly arrived missionaries of the Social Gospel persuasion like himself, who are convinced that their mission is good works, that is, the uplift of society through science, education, and social change. Through the decade of the 1910s, Treadup organizes campaigns to introduce modern science to the educated men of the city in the hope that they will spread this knowledge down to the masses. He uses posters, pictures, and scientific demonstrations to arouse interest among the audience, for instance a gyroscope, with which he performs impressive feats. This work is modeled on that of Hersey's father, Roscoe.

The science campaigns are successful but conversions few. Treadup then meets the dynamic Christian "Johnny Wu," modeled on "Jimmy Yen" (Y.C. James Yen), who mounted a nationwide literacy campaign for the Chinese National Y.M.C.A. after World War I. In the face of mounting opposition to imperialism and foreign missions, which led to an anti-Christian movement among young intellectuals, Wu moves to the countryside and sparks the Rural Reconstruction Movement at just the time when Mao Zedong was also moving from the city to the village. Treadup is inspired to join Wu, but Wu replies that foreigners are not welcome. Treadup instead moves to Paoting (Baoding), Hebei, where the actual missionary Hugh Hubbard worked. In the 1930s, Treadup becomes troubled about the usefulness of the American version of Christianity to China's problems. As the Fundamentalist–Modernist Controversy develops at home and in China, he is criticized by his mission board at home for being a "humanist" rather than a true Christian devoted to a personal God and Jesus as his personal savior. Other missionaries at that time, such as Pearl S. Buck, underwent similar doubts and questioning.

At the start of the Second Sino-Japanese War Treadup, like the actual missionary Lewis Gilbert, witnesses the Nanking Massacre, and asks why God would allow such atrocities. When war between the United States and Japan is declared in 1941, Treadup is imprisoned in the Weixian Internment Camp, as were many actual missionaries such as John Leighton Stuart.

After the end of the war in 1945, as Mao's forces take over China, Treadup leaves for home disillusioned with the American mission in China. He reflects that he came to China motivated by personal need, group psychology, hypnotism by the preacher who aroused his idealism, and fear for himself.

The novel ends with a note that Treadup's oldest son, Philip, tried in vain to get his father's ashes buried in Shanghai in 1981.

== Background and major themes ==
The novel is dedicated "To The Memory of Roscoe Monroe Hersey, Senior," Hersey's father, who also appears as a minor character in the book. Hersey himself was born in Tianjin, a city on China's northern coast, where his parents worked with the Chinese Y.M.C.A. Like Treadup, their emphasis was on the Social Gospel, bringing education and social reform rather than an emphasis on the literal truth of the Bible. Hersey explains that the novel is a "fictional biography" in which the traits and experiences of Treadup are based on six actual missionaries, including his father, as well as G. Herbert Cole, C.H. Robertson, Hugh Hubbard, Fletcher S. Brockman, and Lewis Gilbert. Treadup's name, Hersey commented, hinted of "striving for ascension."

Many of the other characters are closely based on historical figures and most of the events depicted actually happened, although not necessarily in exactly the same order or to the analogous people. "Johnny Wu," for instance, is based on "Jimmy" Yen (Y.C. James Yen) whose mission was to bring literacy to China and Rural Reconstruction to the Chinese village. Hersey's father worked with Yen's literacy movement in the 1920s, and Hersey interviewed Yen extensively while researching the novel. The character Lin Fu-chen is much like Chang Po-ling, the founder of the Nankai Middle School in Tianjin, which was attended by Zhou Enlai, who plays a brief role in the book. Other prominent figures of the time appear as the story develops.

The distinguished American historian Arthur Waldron wrote that the novel is "a tale of lost faith and futility in the face of bland Chinese indifference to Western concerns...." He sees this theme especially at the novel's "tragicomic conclusion," when Treadup's son returns in an attempt to bury his parents' ashes, as they had wished, in Shanghai's Christian cemetery. The cemetery has been destroyed and forgotten: a concrete apartment house now fills the site. "All that effort for nothing," the son concludes, speaking, says Waldron, perhaps, "not only of his attempt to fulfill his filial duty, but of the entire missionary enterprise in China."

Shortly after the novel was published, Hersey told an interviewer

The deep impulse that I wanted to try to write about in The Call was, I think, a very American one, of wanting to be useful and helpful in the world. It's not by any means simply a Christian or missionary impulse; it's manifested in the Peace Corps, and in the kind of response the starvation in Africa has brought. But it seems to me that in the last twenty-five years the impulse of greed has grown in this country, the self-centered drive that makes people primarily fight for their own. The whole swing of the dominant political force toward the right has been, I think, a reflection of and stimulus to this move toward self-centeredness or greed. I find it very distressing.

The book contains a section of notes and a listing of the archives, interviews, and secondary sources Heresy used in gathering background material. When asked about the role of factual, historical research for the book as a novel, Hersey replied:

It's a substitute for memory, I suppose... But Flannery O'Connor said in one of her essays that fiction is an incarnational act; you're trying to make flesh and blood of things that are remembered. And in order to do that it's absolutely essential to make the past concrete. There have to be real, palpable objects, things seen, things heard. So either memory or a substitute for memory has to operate to bring those things into the fields of vision and hearing. Research in this case was partly a substitute, partly a supplement, to memory. I had at least a child's memory of the world of China,

An entire section of Treadup's journal is lifted verbatim, without attribution, from an actual letter written by William W. Lockwood, General Secretary of the Shanghai YMCA from 1903 to 1936.

== Reception ==
Reviewers recognized and welcomed the novel as a portrayal of the American missionary experience in China. China historians were especially warm. John King Fairbank in New York Review praised the book for giving "an authentic sense of the sights, sounds, and smells, the amenities and disasters of old China," and called the book an "epitaph for 120 years of Protestant missions in China." The mission enterprise, he continued, was "the great American experience of semicolonialism," which was in fact a "fine thing if you can get it, as we could, without a sense of guilt for having set it up."

Beverly Causey, writing in the Historical Magazine of the Protestant Episcopal Church praised the book for "interesting glimpses of China's history and American missionary experience," but was disappointed that the book tells the reader "much less about Emily than it does of David."
