= Global Aquaculture Alliance =

Global Aquaculture Alliance (GAA) is an international non-profit trade association dedicated to advancing responsible aquaculture. Established in 1997, GAA works with industry, the NGO community, governments, academia and the investment community. GAA has published best management practice for water pollution for aquaculture, a type of standard that has gained widespread application in traditional agriculture.

== See also ==
- Agerskovgruppen
- FAO GM Foods Platform
