= Juan Flavier =

Filipino physician and politician (1935–2014)

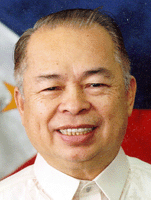
- Official portrait as a senator

President pro tempore of the Senate of the Philippines
- In office August 12, 2002 – June 30, 2007
- Preceded by: Manuel Villar
- Succeeded by: Jinggoy Estrada

Senator of the Philippines
- In office June 30, 1995 – June 30, 2007

20th Secretary of Health
- In office July 1, 1992 – January 30, 1995
- President: Fidel V. Ramos
- Preceded by: Antonio Periquet
- Succeeded by: Jaime Galvez-Tan

Chairman of the Dangerous Drugs Board
- In office 1992–1995
- President: Fidel V. Ramos
- Preceded by: Antonio Periquet
- Succeeded by: Jaime Galvez-Tan

Personal details
- Born: Juan Martin Flavier; June 23, 1935 Tondo, Manila, Philippine Islands
- Died: October 30, 2014 (aged 79) Quezon City, Philippines
- Party: Lakas
- Spouse: Alma Susana Aguila Flavier
- Children: 4
- Education: University of the Philippines Manila (M.D.); Johns Hopkins University (M.P.H.)
- Profession: Physician

Juan Martin Flavier (Tagalog pronunciation: [hwan mɐɾˈtɪn flaˈvjeɹ]; June 23, 1935 – October 30, 2014) was a Filipino physician and politician. He served as the secretary of health under President Fidel V. Ramos from 1992 to 1995, and was later elected to the Senate, serving from 1995 to 2007.

== Early life ==
Flavier was born in Tondo, Manila. He was born into a very poor family to semi-literate parents. He eventually moved to Baguio, where he finished his secondary studies at the Baguio City National High School. He trained as a doctor and received his Doctor of Medicine degree from the UP College of Medicine at the University of the Philippines Manila in 1960 and a Master of Public Health from the Bloomberg School of Public Health at Johns Hopkins University in 1969.

He was known for his short stature at only 1.50 meters (4 ft 11 in).

== Career ==
=== Doctor to the barrios ===
Flavier went to serve poor rural barangays in Nueva Ecija and Cavite as a "doctor to the barrios". He was a "country doctor" for 30 years. His work was recognized, and he was appointed president of the Philippine Rural Reconstruction Movement in 1967. From 1978 to 1992, he was president of the International Institute of Rural Reconstruction.

=== Secretary of health (1992–1995) ===
In 1992, Philippine President Fidel Ramos appointed Flavier as Secretary of the Department of Health. During his term, he initiated various health programs such as "Let's DOH It!", "Yosi Kadiri", Oplan Alis Disease, Kontra Kolera, Stop TB, Araw ng Sangkap Pinoy, Family Planning, and the Doctor to the Barrios program. During his term, barangay health workers were organized. He served as Secretary of the Department of Health until 1995. He was regularly rated one of the most popular government officials and his department one of the most effective. He was considered one of the most popular Secretaries of Health.

=== Senator of the Philippines (1995–2007) ===
In 1995, he ran for senator and won under the Ramos administration ticket, and was re-elected to a second term in the 2001 elections, placing second among the 12 winning candidates. As a senator, he authored and sponsored several landmark bills including the Traditional Medicine Law, the Social Reform and Poverty Alleviation Act, the Philippine Clean Air Act, the Indigenous Peoples' Rights Act, the Anti-Money Laundering Act, the Barangay Micro-Business Enterprises Act, the National Service Training Program for Tertiary Students, the Comprehensive Dangerous Drugs Act, the Plant Variety Protection Act, the Philippine Nursing Act, the Tobacco Regulation Act, and the law declaring Eid'l Fitr a national public holiday.

During his time in the Senate, he maintained a perfect attendance record during sessions, a fact mentioned in the Senate resolution marking his death, which read in part: "The hard-working legislator registered a perfect attendance during the sessions and was instrumental in the enactment of landmark legislations promoting public health care and improving the quality of life of the people." He was also the "poorest" senator, with a net worth on his 2005 Statement of Assets, Liabilities and Net Worth (SALN) of 3.49 million Philippine pesos.

Flavier was also formerly a resident presenter on Kapwa Ko Mahal Ko, a public service program on GMA Network.

== Popular culture ==
Flavier was portrayed in Magpakailanman by Ogie Alcasid.

== Death ==
Flavier died of pneumonia-related sepsis and organ failure at 16:00 PST (GMT+8) on October 30, 2014, at the age of 79. He was admitted to the intensive care unit of the National Kidney and Transplant Institute in Quezon City as early as September 11.

== Works ==
Flavier wrote a regular newspaper column about his experiences as a doctor in the countryside, even while he served as Health Secretary.

Flavier authored several books, including Doctor to the Barrios, wherein he narrates his experience working with and for the Philippine Rural Reconstruction Movement.

=== Books ===
- Doctor to the Barrios: Experiences with the Philippine Rural Reconstruction Movement (1970)
- My Friends in the Barrios (1974)
- Back to the Barrios: Balikbaryo (1978)
- Parables of the Barrio: Vol. I (1988)
- Parables of the Barrio: Vol. II, Nos. 51-100 (1989)
- Parables of the Barrio: Vol. III, Nos. 101-150 (1991)
- Let's DOH It!: How We Did It (1998)
- From Barrio to Senado: An Autobiography (2009)

=== Papers ===
- Mobilizing Local Leaders for Rural Development: The Case of the People's School (IIRR working paper, 1980)
