= James Levelle =

English filmmaker and explorer (born c.1980)

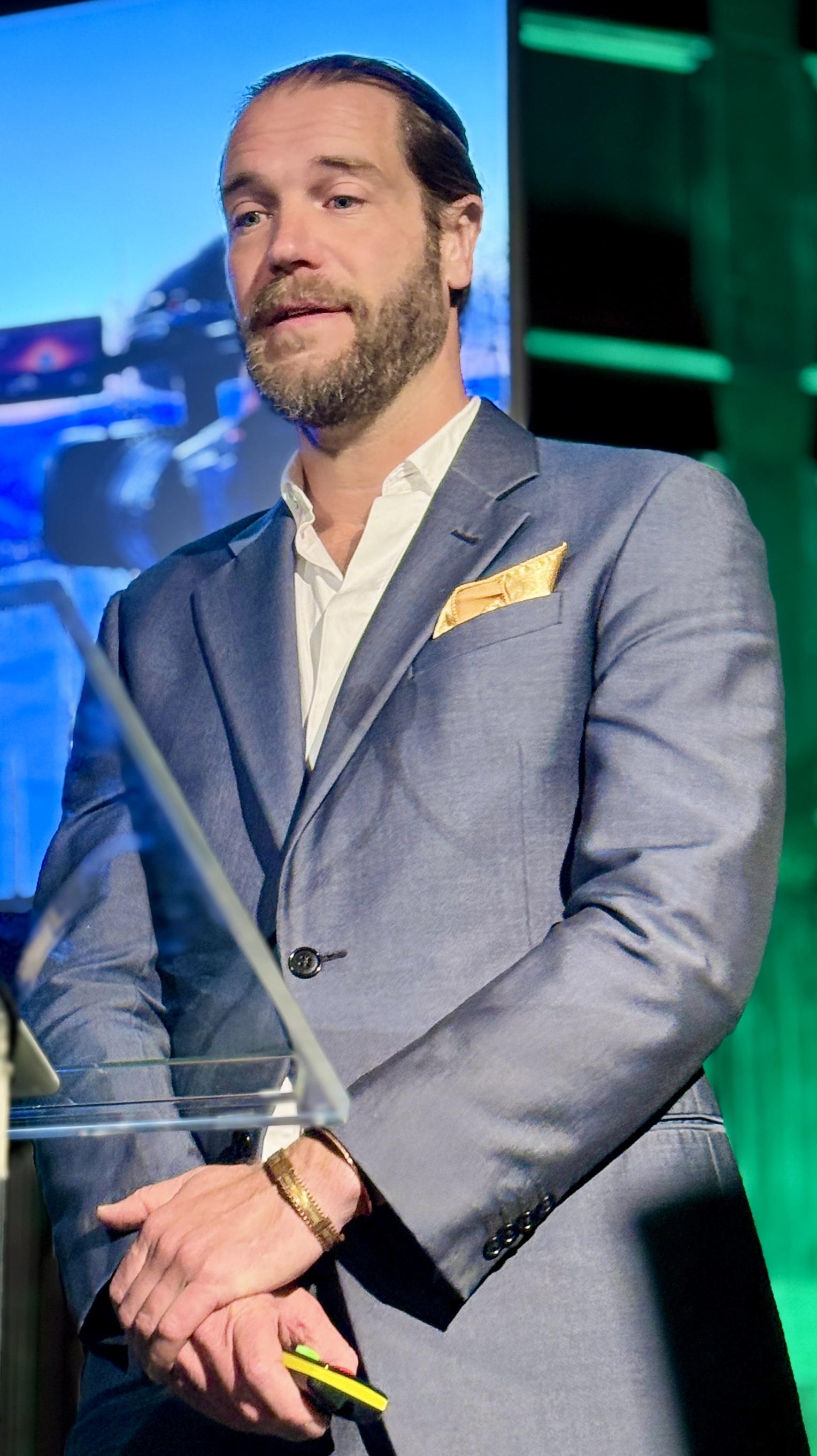
- Levelle in 2024
- Born: c. 1980 (age 44–45)
- Education: Edinburgh University
- Occupation: Filmmaker

James Moorland Levelle (born c. 1980) is an English filmmaker and explorer, who reported on the illegal tiger trade in Tibet, child-labour in the cotton fields of India, pirate fishing off the coast of Sierre Leone, the history of the gold rush in Alaska, and Southeast Asia's illegal logging industry.

== Early life and education ==
James Levelle was born c. 1980, and brought up in London with his father who worked in advertising and his mother who was a health care professional in alternative medicine. He graduated from Edinburgh University with a degree in English.

== Career ==
In 2007, the Environmental Justice Foundation sent Levelle to India to explore child labour in cotton fields. He was subsequently asked to film illegal pirate fishing off the coast of Sierre Leone. National Geographic then asked him to direct their 'Eco Crime Investigators’ series, and sent him to China and Tibet to investigate criminal tiger skin and bone trade. This was followed by reporting on Southeast Asia's illegal logging industry.

In 2019, Levelle set off from London to Chile, where the COP25 climate conference was due to take place. Almost half way to Chile when the conference was cancelled, he continued and completed the journey while reporting on the impact of climate change on young people.

== Personal ==
Around 2015, Levelle moved to a house boat on the River Lea in East London.

== Selected works ==
- "Chainsaw Massacre". Green Screen Naturfilmfestival. 4 December 2024. (director)

== See also ==
- Discovery Channel
