= BCH =

BCH or BCh may refer to:

== Science and technology ==
- BCH code (Bose–Chaudhuri–Hocquenghem code), a code in coding theory
- Bachelor of Surgery, a component of some undergraduate medical degrees
- Baker–Campbell–Hausdorff formula, in mathematics and Lie group theory
- Biosafety Clearing-House, an international mechanism that exchanges information about the movement of genetically modified organisms
- Birdsell Clover Huller, an agricultural machine
- Bitcoin Cash, a peer-to-peer electronic cash system
- Bean chitinase, a defensive enzyme

== Organisations ==
- Birmingham Children's Hospital, a hospital in England
- Boston Children’s Hospital, a hospital in Boston, Massachusetts
- Blue Castle Holdings, developer of nuclear power stations in the US
- British and Commonwealth Holdings, a defunct UK financial services company
- Bataliony Chłopskie, a Polish resistance movement in World War II
- Belfast City Hospital, a hospital in Northern Ireland
- Central Bank of Honduras (Spanish: Banco Central de Honduras)
- Peasant Battalions (Polish: Bataliony Chlopskie)

== Transportation ==
- Baucau Airport (IATA code), East Timor
- Belarusian Railway (BCh), (Belarusian: Беларуская чыгунка), the state railway company of Belarus
- Birchington-on-Sea railway station, England
- British Columbia Hydro and Power Authority (railway reporting mark)
- Bch, short for "Beach"; a Street suffix as used in the US

== Other uses ==
- Barclays Cycle Hire, former name of a public bicycle sharing scheme in London, England

== See also ==
- Broadcast control channel (BCCH), a control channel in GSM Um Radio Interface
