= Guy Alitto =

American academic

Guy Salvatore Alitto (Chinese: 艾恺; pinyin: Aì Kǎi) is an American academic in the History and East Asian Languages and Civilization Departments at the University of Chicago. He is known in China for revitalizing the scholarship on Chinese Confucian scholar Liang Shuming. He is also often quoted in popular Chinese media sources. He is best known in America for his scholarship and for his role as translator for the first official Chinese delegations to the United States after Richard Nixon's first visits to China.

== Career ==
Alitto received his Ph.D. at Harvard in 1975 in Chinese history. His advisors were Benjamin I. Schwartz and John Fairbank. Alitto did not immediately find a faculty position in the United States. Instead, he took a part-time role in Donghai University in Taiwan.

His first book (published by University of California Press in 1979), The Last Confucian: Liang Shu-ming and the Chinese Dilemma of Modernity, won the John K. Fairbank Prize. In it, Alitto studies Liang as a forward looking Confucian who put his thought into action. Liang, along with James Yen and Tao Xingzhi, was a leader in the Rural Reconstruction Movement of the 1920s and 1930s. His Rural Reconstruction project in Zouping County, Shandong, drew national attention but was destroyed in the Japanese Invasion of 1937. The Yale historian Jonathan Spence wrote in the New York Times "Sunday Book Review" that it was an "engrossing study" in which Liang was "lucky to have found a biographer who takes him seriously."

Alitto was one of the first foreign academicians allowed into rural China and observed Zouping between 1987 and 1991. He continued visiting the area throughout the 80s and 90s, and it is reported in China Daily that the academic became a regular figure in the area.

== Influence in China ==
Alitto is best known in China for revitalizing scholarship into Liang Shuming with his The Last Confucian. Before this book, Liang had been "consigned to the dustbin of history." Alitto was widely popularized in the China Central TV episode The Last Confucian and Me.

Alitto is often cited in Chinese national media sources. Examples include Alitto's support of Chinese jurisdiction in the Senkaku Islands dispute, his statement that the Falun Gong "represents more of a rupture than a continuity with Chinese religious traditions," or his interest in rural areas of China.

== Select publications ==
- --, ed. Contemporary Confucianism in Thought and Action. Berlin: Springer Berlin, 2015.
- "Ershiyi shiji de shijiewenhua hui yanhuazhi rujiahua de wenhua ma?" (Will 21st century culture evolve into a Confucianized culture?) in Dushu (Beijing 1996).
- "Zhongguo wenhua xingcheng de yaosu ji qi tezheng" (The essential elements in the formation of Chinese culture and their special features) in Guo Tingyi xiansheng jiuzhi danchen jinian lunwenji (Taipei 1995).
- 世界范围内的反现代化思潮 Shijie fanweinei de fanxiandaihua sichao: lun wenhua shouchengzhiyi (Anti-modernization thought trends in a world-wide perspective: on cultural conservatism) (Guiyang: Guizhou Provincial Press 1991).
- Guy S. Alitto (1979). The Last Confucian: Liang Shu-ming and the Chinese Dilemma of Modernity. University of California Press. ISBN 0-520-03123-7 – via Internet Archive.
- Alitto, Guy S. (1986), The Last Confucian: Liang Shu-ming and the Chinese Dilemma of Modernity, University of California Press; second ed., ISBN 9780520053182.
- “Zouping in Historical Perspective” (Chap. 2), in Oi, Jean C. and Goldstein M, eds. Zouping Revisited: Adaptive Governance in a Chinese County. Stanford, Ca. Stanford University Press. 2018
- 最后的儒家：梁漱溟与中国现代化的两难. 大学教育与研究出版社 (Beijing: Foreign Studies University Teaching and Research Press, 2014. Alitto's own translation of The Last Confucian: Liang Shuming and the Dilemma of Chinese Modernity.
- Alitto, Guy S. (1980). "Introduction: Review Symposium: Thomas A. Metzger's Escapte Fro Predicament". The Journal of Asian Studies. 39 (2): 237–243. doi:10.2307/2054286. JSTOR 2054286. S2CID 247663080.
