= Philippine Rural Reconstruction Movement =

Filipino non-governmental organization

The Philippine Rural Reconstruction Movement, abbreviated as PRRM, is a non-governmental organization and institution formed in 1952. As a movement, it was initiated by upper and middle class group of individuals. After World War II, among its tasks had been the establishment of cooperatives in rural communities. It was the inspiration for the founding of the Federation of Free Farmers in 1953, as well as the birthing of organizations similar to PRRM in other countries such as Thailand, Colombia, India, and Guatemala. Its main office is in Quezon City.

== Historical background ==
In the 1950s, the Philippine Rural Reconstruction Movement was founded and inspired by its then leader Dr. Y.C. James "Jimmy" Yen (also known as Yan Yangchu) Dr. Yen, a national of China, drew on his experience in the Rural Reconstruction Movement there in the 1930s and 1940s. It began work in Nueva Ecija and then also in Rizal province, led by Filipinos such as Conrado Benitez of the University of the Philippines, with the aim of providing training in self-government and how such communities can sustain themselves globally, nationally, and locally.

In 1970, former Philippine Secretary of Health and Senator Dr. Juan Flavier, conveyed his experiences working with and for PRRM in his book Doctor to the Barrios.

In 2009, PRRM became a partner of the Ayala Foundation USA, with the task of building potable water facilities within chosen Philippine barangays.

== Goals ==
Among its present-day roles is the promotion of sustainable agriculture, technologies in the fishing business and farming, agroforestry, planning and implementation of managing resources in communities, improvement in access to justice, and the dissemination of information to other Philippine and Asian non-governmental organizations.
