= Cartagena Protocol on Biosafety =

2003 international agreement on biosafety

Cartagena Protocol on Biosafety to the Convention on Biological Diversity
- Type: Environmental
- Drafted: 29 January 2000
- Signed: 16 May 2000
- Location: Montreal, Quebec, Canada (originally scheduled for 1999 in Cartagena, Colombia)
- Effective: 11 September 2003
- Signatories: 103
- Parties: 173
- Depositary: Secretary-General of the United Nations
- Languages: Arabic, Chinese, English, French, Russian, and Spanish

The Cartagena Protocol on Biosafety to the Convention on Biological Diversity is an international agreement on biosafety as a supplement to the Convention on Biological Diversity (CBD) effective since 2003. The Biosafety Protocol seeks to protect biological diversity from the potential risks posed by genetically modified organisms resulting from modern biotechnology.

The Biosafety Protocol makes clear that products from new technologies must be based on the precautionary principle and allow developing nations to balance public health against economic benefits. It will for example let countries ban imports of genetically modified organisms if they feel there is not enough scientific evidence that the product is safe and requires exporters to label shipments containing genetically altered commodities such as corn or cotton.

The required number of 50 instruments of ratification/accession/approval/acceptance by countries was reached in May 2003. In accordance with the provisions of its Article 37, the Protocol entered into force on 11 September 2003. As of July 2020, the Protocol had 173 parties, which include 170 United Nations member states, the State of Palestine, Niue, and the European Union.

== Background ==
The Cartagena Protocol on Biosafety, also known as the Biosafety Protocol, was adopted in January 2000, after a CBD Open-ended Ad Hoc Working Group on Biosafety had met six times between July 1996 and February 1999. The Working Group submitted a draft text of the Protocol, for consideration by Conference of the Parties at its first extraordinary meeting, which was convened for the express purpose of adopting a protocol on biosafety to the CBD. After a few delays, the Cartagena Protocol was eventually adopted on 29 January 2000 The Biosafety Protocol seeks to protect biological diversity from the potential risks posed by living modified organisms resulting from modern biotechnology.

== Objective ==
In accordance with the precautionary approach, contained in Principle 15 of the Rio Declaration on Environment and Development, the objective of the Protocol is to contribute to ensuring an adequate level of protection in the field of the safe transfer, handling and use of 'living modified organisms resulting from modern biotechnology' that may have adverse effects on the conservation and sustainable use of biological diversity, taking also into account risks to human health, and specifically focusing on transboundary movements (Article 1 of the Protocol, SCBD 2000).

== Living modified organisms (LMOs) ==
The protocol defines a 'living modified organism' as any living organism that possesses a novel combination of genetic material obtained through the use of modern biotechnology, and 'living organism' means any biological entity capable of transferring or replicating genetic material, including sterile organisms, viruses and viroids. 'Modern biotechnology' is defined in the Protocol to mean the application of in vitro nucleic acid techniques, or fusion of cells beyond the taxonomic family, that overcome natural physiological reproductive or recombination barriers and are not techniques used in traditional breeding and selection. 'Living modified organism (LMO) Products' are defined as processed material that are of living modified organism origin, containing detectable novel combinations of replicable genetic material obtained through the use of modern biotechnology. Common LMOs include agricultural crops that have been genetically modified for greater productivity or for resistance to pests or diseases. Examples of modified crops include tomatoes, cassava, corn, cotton and soybeans. 'Living modified organism intended for direct use as food or feed, or for processing (LMO-FFP)' are agricultural commodities from GM crops. Overall the term 'living modified organisms' is equivalent to genetically modified organism – the Protocol did not make any distinction between these terms and did not use the term 'genetically modified organism.'

== Precautionary approach ==
One of the outcomes of the United Nations Conference on Environment and Development (also known as the Earth Summit) held in Rio de Janeiro, Brazil, in June 1992, was the adoption of the Rio Declaration on Environment and Development, which contains 27 principles to underpin sustainable development. Commonly known as the precautionary principle, Principle 15 states that "In order to protect the environment, the precautionary approach shall be widely applied by States according to their capabilities. Where there are threats of serious or irreversible damage, lack of full scientific certainty shall not be used as a reason for postponing cost-effective measures to prevent environmental degradation."

Elements of the precautionary approach are reflected in a number of the provisions of the Protocol, such as:

- The preamble, reaffirming "the precautionary approach contained in Principle 15 of the Rio Declaration on environment and Development";
- Article 1, indicating that the objective of the Protocol is "in accordance with the precautionary approach contained in Principle 15 of the Rio Declaration on Environment and Development";
- Article 10.6 and 11.8, which states "Lack of scientific certainty due to insufficient relevant scientific information and knowledge regarding the extent of the potential adverse effects of an LMO on biodiversity, taking into account risks to human health, shall not prevent a Party of import from taking a decision, as appropriate, with regard to the import of the LMO in question, in order to avoid or minimize such potential adverse effects."; and
- Annex III on risk assessment, which notes that "Lack of scientific knowledge or scientific consensus should not necessarily be interpreted as indicating a particular level of risk, an absence of risk, or an acceptable risk."

== Application ==
The Protocol applies to the transboundary movement, transit, handling and use of all living modified organisms that may have adverse effects on the conservation and sustainable use of biological diversity, taking also into account risks to human health (Article 4 of the Protocol, SCBD 2000).

== Parties and non-parties ==
The governing body of the Protocol is called the Conference of the Parties to the Convention serving as the meeting of the Parties to the Protocol (also the COP-MOP). The main function of this body is to review the implementation of the Protocol and make decisions necessary to promote its effective operation. Decisions under the Protocol can only be taken by Parties to the Protocol. Parties to the Convention that are not Parties to the Protocol may only participate as observers in the proceedings of meetings of the COP-MOP.

The Protocol addresses the obligations of Parties in relation to the transboundary movements of LMOs to and from non-Parties to the Protocol. The transboundary movements between Parties and non-Parties must be carried out in a manner that is consistent with the objective of the Protocol. Parties are required to encourage non-Parties to adhere to the Protocol and to contribute information to the Biosafety Clearing-House.

== Relationship with the WTO ==
A number of agreements under the World Trade Organization (WTO), such as the Agreement on the Application of Sanitary and Phytosanitary Measures (SPS Agreement) and the Agreement on Technical Barriers to Trade (TBT Agreement), and the Agreement on Trade-Related Aspects of Intellectual Property Rights (TRIPs), contain provisions that are relevant to the Protocol. This Protocol states in its preamble that parties:

- Recognize that trade and environment agreements should be mutually supportive;
- Emphasize that the Protocol is not interpreted as implying a change in the rights and obligations under any existing agreements; and
- Understand that the above recital is not intended to subordinate the Protocol to other international agreements.

== Main features ==
=== Overview of features ===
The Protocol promotes biosafety by establishing rules and procedures for the safe transfer, handling, and use of LMOs, with specific focus on transboundary movements of LMOs. It features a set of procedures including one for LMOs that are to be intentionally introduced into the environment called the advance informed agreement procedure, and one for LMOs that are intended to be used directly as food or feed or for processing. Parties to the Protocol must ensure that LMOs are handled, packaged and transported under conditions of safety. Furthermore, the shipment of LMOs subject to transboundary movement must be accompanied by appropriate documentation specifying, among other things, identity of LMOs and contact point for further information. These procedures and requirements are designed to provide importing Parties with the necessary information needed for making informed decisions about whether or not to accept LMO imports and for handling them in a safe manner.

The Party of import makes its decisions in accordance with scientifically sound risk assessments. The Protocol sets out principles and methodologies on how to conduct a risk assessment. In case of insufficient relevant scientific information and knowledge, the Party of import may use precaution in making their decisions on import. Parties may also take into account, consistent with their international obligations, socio-economic considerations in reaching decisions on import of LMOs.

Parties must also adopt measures for managing any risks identified by the risk assessment, and they must take necessary steps in the event of accidental release of LMOs.

To facilitate its implementation, the Protocol establishes a Biosafety Clearing-House for Parties to exchange information, and contains a number of important provisions, including capacity-building, a financial mechanism, compliance procedures, and requirements for public awareness and participation.

=== Procedures for moving LMOs across borders ===
==== Advance Informed Agreement ====
The "Advance Informed Agreement" (AIA) procedure applies to the first intentional transboundary movement of LMOs for intentional introduction into the environment of the Party of import. It includes four components: notification by the Party of export or the exporter, acknowledgment of receipt of notification by the Party of import, the decision procedure, and opportunity for review of decisions. The purpose of this procedure is to ensure that importing countries have both the opportunity and the capacity to assess risks that may be associated with the LMO before agreeing to its import. The Party of import must indicate the reasons on which its decisions are based (unless consent is unconditional). A Party of import may, at any time, in light of new scientific information, review and change a decision. A Party of export or a notifier may also request the Party of import to review its decisions.

However, the Protocol's AIA procedure does not apply to certain categories of LMOs:

- LMOs in transit;
- LMOs destined for contained use;
- LMOs intended for direct use as food or feed or for processing

While the Protocol's AIA procedure does not apply to certain categories of LMOs, Parties have the right to regulate the importation on the basis of domestic legislation. There are also allowances in the Protocol to declare certain LMOs exempt from application of the AIA procedure.

==== LMOs intended for food or feed, or for processing ====
LMOs intended for direct use as food or feed, or processing (LMOs-FFP) represent a large category of agricultural commodities. The Protocol, instead of using the AIA procedure, establishes a more simplified procedure for the transboundary movement of LMOs-FFP. Under this procedure, A Party must inform other Parties through the Biosafety Clearing-House, within 15 days, of its decision regarding domestic use of LMOs that may be subject to transboundary movement.

Decisions by the Party of import on whether or not to accept the import of LMOs-FFP are taken under its domestic regulatory framework that is consistent with the objective of the Protocol. A developing country Party or a Party with an economy in transition may, in the absence of a domestic regulatory framework, declare through the Biosafety Clearing-House that its decisions on the first import of LMOs-FFP will be taken in accordance with risk assessment as set out in the Protocol and time frame for decision-making.

=== Handling, transport, packaging and identification ===
The Protocol provides for practical requirements that are deemed to contribute to the safe movement of LMOs. Parties are required to take measures for the safe handling, packaging and transportation of LMOs that are subject to transboundary movement. The Protocol specifies requirements on identification by setting out what information must be provided in documentation that should accompany transboundary shipments of LMOs. It also leaves room for possible future development of standards for handling, packaging, transport and identification of LMOs by the meeting of the Parties to the Protocol.

Each Party is required to take measures ensuring that LMOs subject to intentional transboundary movement are accompanied by documentation identifying the LMOs and providing contact details of persons responsible for such movement. The details of these requirements vary according to the intended use of the LMOs, and, in the case of LMOs for food, feed or for processing, they should be further addressed by the governing body of the Protocol. (Article 18 of the Protocol, SCBD 2000).

The first meeting of the Parties adopted decisions outlining identification requirements for different categories of LMOs (Decision BS-I/6, SCBD 2004). However, the second meeting of the Parties failed to reach agreement on the detailed requirements to identify LMOs intended for direct use as food, feed or for processing and will need to reconsider this issue at its third meeting in March 2006.

=== Biosafety Clearing-House ===
The Protocol established a Biosafety Clearing-House (BCH), in order to facilitate the exchange of scientific, technical, environmental and legal information on, and experience with, living modified organisms; and to assist Parties to implement the Protocol (Article 20 of the Protocol, SCBD 2000). It was established in a phased manner, and the first meeting of the Parties approved the transition from the pilot phase to the fully operational phase, and adopted modalities for its operations (Decision BS-I/3, SCBD 2004).

== See also ==
- Biosafety Clearing-House
- Substantial equivalence
- Nagoya Protocol, another supplementary protocol adopted by the CBD
