= Environmental Justice Foundation =

Human rights organization

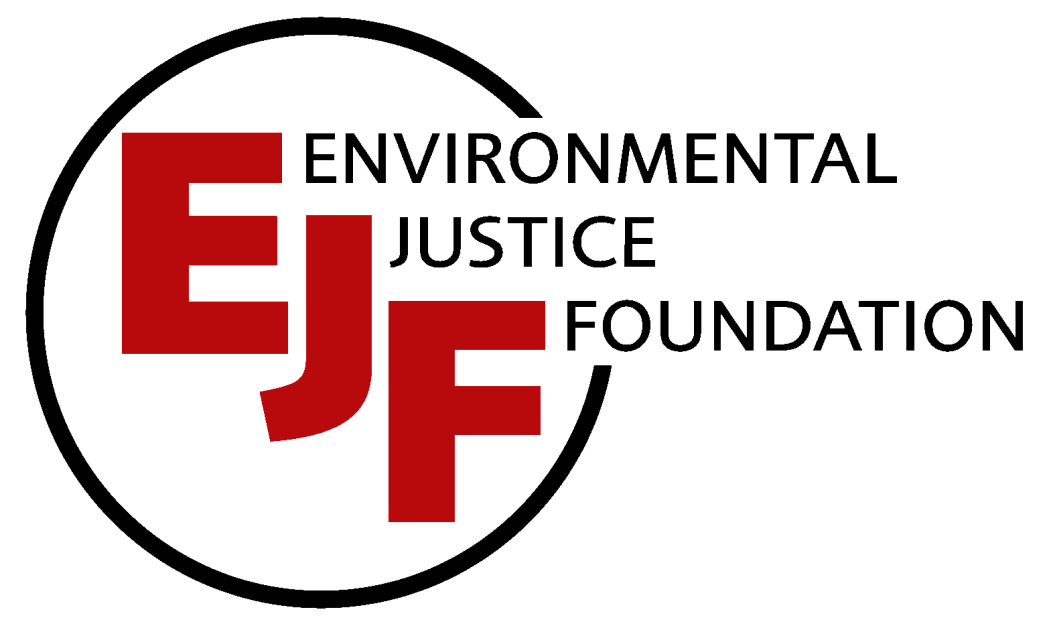
- Founded: 2001 by Steve Trent (Executive Director) & Juliette Williams (Programme Director) and Patrons: Rachel Whiteread, Emilia Fox, Benedict Allen, Iain Banks
- Purpose: Environmentalism and Human rights
- Region served: Global South
- Method: Investigations, Campaigning, Grassroots training action,
- Revenue: £2 613 414 (2019)
- Website: ejfoundation.org

The Environmental Justice Foundation (EJF) is a non-governmental organisation (NGO) founded in 2001 by Steve Trent and Juliette Williams that promotes the non-violent resolution of human rights abuses and related environmental issues in the Global South. It describes itself as "a UK-based non-profit organisation working internationally to protect the environment and human rights."

EJF's core tenet, as set out in its Mission Statement asserts that the injustices suffered by people living in poor and disenfranchised communities are often closely related to the destruction, over-exploitation and other abuses of the local natural environment these people depend on.

EJF makes direct links between the western world's demands for cheap food and other goods, especially fish, shrimp and cotton and degraded natural environments in developing countries.

In seeking to resolve environmental and human rights abuses, EJF works to give an international voice to vulnerable communities working to protect the local environment that sustains their basic human needs of a shelter, food and income.

Its work covers five main campaigning areas: 'Illegal, unreported and unregulated fishing (IUU); pesticide use; cotton production; shrimp farming; and climate refugees. EJF has also campaigned on the issue of the trade in wild animals with NGO partner WildAid.

Much of the Environmental Justice Foundation's work involves training and equipping affected environmental justice communities in producer countries to investigate, record and expose abuses and then campaign effectively for an equitable resolution to the issues.

Emphasis is placed on the power of film, both to record irrefutable evidence of environmental injustice and to create strong campaigning messages.

It sees its role as a catalyst working to achieve long-term change, by alerting governments, international policy makers, consumers and businesses to the damaging human and environmental effects that western demand has on the natural environment and local communities, primarily in the global south. EJF aims to encourage action from key decision-makers in business and politics, along with individual action from consumers and concerned individuals.

== History ==
The Environmental Justice Foundation was founded in London, UK in 2000 and became a Registered Charity in August 2001 by Steve Trent and Juliette Williams. EJF's creation was a response to the human suffering and environmental degradation that its founders witnessed in their work as environmental campaigners.

This experience had led both founders to conclude that the basic human rights of people in the world's poorest countries often depend on those people's access to a healthy environment for food, shelter and a means to make a living.

EJF undertook its first campaign in 2001: defending a community's fishing rights in Cambodia. As a result of training and documentation programmes, a national network – the Fisheries Action Coalition Team – was founded. The Fisheries Action Coalition Team is a coalition of NGO consisting of 12 NGOs, both local and international, which was localised from NGO Forum. A campaign report called Feast or Famine was produced and presented to policymakers at a meeting hosted by the British Ambassador to Cambodia, proving to be a catalyst for the issue in the country as well as securing international support.

EJF expanded its work to encompass the pesticide endosulfan (2002), trafficking of wildlife (2003), shrimp trawling and shrimp farming (2003), illegal, unreported and unregulated IUU fishing (2004), cotton production (2004) and climate refugees (2009).

== Areas of work and approach ==
According to the Impact Report 2008/09, the Environmental Justice Foundation pursues its goals through: investigation, campaigns, aiding grassroots action by communities in producer countries and catalysing consumer, business and governmental action internationally.

It sends its own reporters to investigate, document and compile reports of environmental and human rights abuses in the Global South. It also works on the ground to help train local groups in effective investigative and reporting techniques to publicise abuses in their area and then advocate on those issues nationally and globally.

EJF's work often takes it into partnership with other NGOs, national governments and international bodies, businesses and corporations. It works with celebrity ambassadors to publicise its campaigns including its Patrons – artist Rachel Whiteread, actress Emilia Fox, writer Iain Banks, explorer Benedict Allen and model, actress and activist Lily Cole. Nobel Prize-winner Harold Pinter, CH, CBE was an EJF Patron from 2003 to 2008.

== Campaigns ==
EJF campaigns directly at policy-makers including the European Commission, Parliament and United Nations organisations. In January 2011 EJF presented a petition of 10,000 signatures to the UN in 2011 calling for a Global Record on Fishing Vessels.

== End of the Road for Endosulfan ==
One of EJF's first programs was its campaign for national and ultimately a global ban on the manufacture and use of chemical pesticide endosulfan. Categorized by the United States Environmental Protection Agency as a ‘highly hazardous' substance, endosulfan has been compared to DDT in its potential for environmental harm.

EJF points out that pesticides such as endosulfan, that are banned or restricted in the EU, the US and other developed nations, are widely used in developing countries, where their harmful potential can be exacerbated by low levels safety awareness, inadequate labeling, illiteracy and poor access to safety equipment.

Endosulfan is readily absorbed by humans via the stomach, lungs and skin where it can cause hormone disruption as well as being a neurotoxin, haemotoxin and nephrotoxin.

During its investigations, EJF has documented in a series of reports of acute medical symptoms linked to endosulfan among farmers and local populations. These symptoms include headache, nausea, breathing problems, renal problems, loss of consciousness, and seizures; numerous fatalities have been documented, particularly in West Africa.

In its reports EJF has expressed concern that, like DDT, endosulfan is persistent in the environment, where it is harmful to mammals, fish, bees, birds and other wildlife. Endosulfan use has led to the pollution and abandonment of agricultural land and it has been shown to bioaccumulate and travel long distances through air and water. In 2009 the Stockholm Convention's Scientific Committee acknowledged endosulfan as being a persistent organic pollutant.

EJF began documenting the use of endosulfan in Cambodia in 2002 and published a report called Death in Small Doses in 2003.

Death in Small Doses, a report on the problems of and alternatives to pesticide use in Cambodia, was presented to Ministries in Cambodia, international donor agencies, media, business and NGOs as part of an advocacy strategy to raise public and political awareness.

Working with CEDAC (Centre d'Etude et de Développement Agricole Cambodgien), a Cambodian NGO, EJF documented widespread use of endosulfan by Cambodian farmers and recorded numerous safety concerns, including a lack of protective equipment and exposure of children, homes, livestock and family food crops.

Labelling inadequacies where endosulfan was being imported to Cambodia from Vietnam and Thailand were also highlighted in EJF's 2004 briefing paper "End of the Road for Endosulfan".

As part of EJF's work in Cambodia in 2002, the charity worked with Cambodian farmers to promote sustainable agriculture and educate them about risks of hazardous pesticides. A short briefing entitled End of the Road for Endosulfan was used to convince the Cambodian Environment Minister to ban endosulfan in the country.

This briefing was later cited in the European Union's 2008 proposal to include endosulfan in the Annexes of the Stockholm Convention.

In 2007, EJF produced a report, Deadly Chemicals in Cotton following investigations that gathered evidence of hazardous pesticide use on cotton crops in Mali and India in 2006, which included documenting the medical impacts of the chemical.

The report, Deadly Chemicals in Cotton, was produced with the Pesticide Action Network UK to raise awareness of the human and environmental costs of pesticide use in West Africa, Uzbekistan and India.

The report also highlights the heavy reliance of cotton production on pesticides and insecticides: an average estimated eight times more per hectare on cotton crop than per hectare of food crop. EJF reports that US$2 billion-worth (2007) are used on cotton crops each year, US$819 million-worth of which are classed as hazardous by the World Health Organization according to the report. EJF characterises cotton as the world's dirtiest crop.

In 2009 EJF launched a new report with the same name as the 2004 briefing paper, 'End of the Road for Endosulfan'. This documents health and environmental impacts associated with endosulfan exposure and advocates alternatives available for all its uses, organic crops and the avoidance of chemical fertilisers and pesticides.

In 2009/10 EJF recruited high-profile Indian celebrities, including film directors Deepa Mehta and M Night Shyamalan, and musician Ravi Shankar, to lend their support to the campaign.

In 2010, EJF was involved in securing a commitment from Bayer Cropscience to end its manufacture of endosulfan by the end of that year.

In 2011, EJF announced on their website that they were "delighted to announce that, after extensive review and debate, we have finally reached the end of the road for chemical pesticide endosulfan" following news that on Friday April 29, 2011, national delegates at the fifth conference of parties (COP5) agreed to list endosulfan under Annex A of the Stockholm Convention on Persistent Organic Pollutants (POPs).

== Wildlife ==
EJF's stated objective for its wildlife campaign is to train and support investigators and advocates for wildlife in key conservation locations around the globe. It is particularly concerned that illegal trafficking of plants and animals for pets, trophies, food and traditional medicines, estimated to be worth $20 billion a year, has a detrimental effect on biodiversity and ecosystems and is pushing some species to the brink of extinction.

The campaign has so far concentrated on working in Vietnam where EJF report that a great diversity of wild species is under threat from the swift recent conversion to agriculture and building development. EJF believe that, Vietnam, although a signatory to CITES, lacks the manpower and legal framework to enforce domestic wildlife legislation.

EJF first collaborated with the NGO Education for Nature Vietnam (ENV) in 2003 which was established in 2000 as Vietnam's first non-governmental organization focused on conservation of nature and wildlife, to combat illegal bear farming. EJF reports that estimated 4000 Asiatic black bears and sun bears are kept illegally in Vietnam's bear farms. Adult bears are caged and their bile regularly extracted for the ursodeoxycholic acid it contains which is then used in traditional medicines and tonics.

In 2003, EJF provided ENV with video, media and advocacy training, a digital stills camera and a computer for film editing and design. It also gave advice and support on website development.

In 2004 EJF helped ENV to conduct undercover investigations into bear farms in and around Hanoi and undertake a consumer survey in preparation for a campaign to influence people's attitudes to bear farming. This included recruiting Vietnamese singer My Linh to front a public service announcement (PSA) shown on Vietnamese television.

In 2006–07, EJF continued training ENV in the use of film to produce another PSA, supplying a cameraman and editor to give assistance. The charity used funding from the World Society for the Protection of Animals to equip ENV with new computer and filming equipment and professional editing software. Further video and media training for ENV was completed in 2008–09.

As a separate part of its wildlife campaign, EJF has committed to support the leading wildlife charity WildAid in their work to support protected areas, investigate illegal wildlife trade and reduce consumer demand. EJF and WildAid UK share a London office and Steve Trent, EJF's Executive Director is the President of WildAid.

== Awards ==
The Environmental Justice Foundation received the SeaWeb Seafood Champion Award for Advocacy in 2015 for its work combating Illegal, Unreported, and Unregulated (IUU) fishing in West African fisheries.
