= Biosafety Clearing-House =

The Biosafety Clearing-House is an international mechanism that exchanges information about the movement of genetically modified organisms, established under the Cartagena Protocol on Biosafety. It assists Parties (i.e. governments that have ratified the Protocol) to implement the protocol’s provisions and to facilitate sharing of information on, and experience with, living modified organisms (also known as genetically modified organisms, GMOs). It further assists Parties and other stakeholders to make informed decisions regarding the importation or release of GMOs.

The Biosafety Clearing-House Central Portal is accessible through the Web. The BCH is a distributed system, and information in it is owned and updated by the users themselves through an authenticated system to ensure timeliness and accuracy.

== Mandate ==
Article 20, paragraph 1 of the Cartagena Protocol on Biosafety established the BCH as part of the clearing-house mechanism of the Convention on Biological Diversity, in order to:

(a) Facilitate the exchange of scientific, technical, environmental and legal information on, and experience with, living modified organisms; and (b) Assist Parties to implement the Protocol, taking into account the special needs of developing country Parties, in particular the least developed and small island developing States among them, and countries with economies in transition as well as countries that are centres of origin and centres of genetic diversity.

=== First use in international law ===
The BCH differs from other similar mechanisms established under other international legal agreements because it is in fact essential for the successful implementation of its parent body, the Protocol. It was the first Internet-based information-exchange mechanism created that must be used to fulfil certain international legal obligations - not only do Parties to the Protocol have a legal obligation to provide certain types of information to the BCH within defined time-frames, but certain provisions cannot be implemented without use of the BCH.

For example, under Article 11.1 of the Protocol, a decision taken on domestic use of a GMO that might cross international borders (this includes placing on the market) must be advised to other potentially affected Parties through the BCH within 15 days of making the decision to allow them to assess potential impacts on their own territories. This is in contrast to the Advance Informed Agreement procedure which is a more traditional bilateral discussion between importers and exporters to obtain prior informed consent before releasing GMOs into the environment.

== Interoperability and the Central Portal of the BCH ==
The Biosafety Clearing-House is designed to be interoperable with other databases, so governments may register their information with the central Biosafety Clearing-House database, or with another (interoperable) database of their choice. The location of the information makes no difference to the user, who is able to retrieve all information through the Central Portal of the Biosafety Clearing-House.

To date, a number of relevant databases have been identified and are interoperable with the Central Portal, including national sites such as the United States Regulatory Agencies Unified Biotechnology Website and the Swiss Biosafety Clearing-House, and international databases such as the Organisation for Economic Co-operation and Development (OECD) unique identification database, the International Centre for Genetic Engineering and Biotechnology (ICGEB) biosafety publications database and The Food and Agriculture Organization (FAO) GM Foods Platform.

== Information in the Biosafety Clearing-House ==
=== Categories of information in the BCH ===
The BCH contains information that must be provided by Parties to the Protocol, such as decisions on release or importation of GMOs, risk assessments, competent national authorities, and national laws; as well as other relevant information and resources, including information on capacity-building, a roster of government-nominated experts in the field, and links to other websites and databases through the Biosafety Information Resource Centre.

Governments that are not Parties to the Protocol are also encouraged to contribute information the BCH, and in fact a large number of the decisions in the BCH have been registered by two non-Party governments (Canada and the United States).

=== Organisation of information in the BCH ===
The BCH uses common formats for reporting information from distributed sources, and standardized terminology or “controlled vocabulary” to categorize the information contained within the databases. This allows the many users of the BCH to use the same terms whether they are registering information or searching for it, including synonyms within a language; relationships between terms; and between languages. To enable access to global information, the BCH operates in all six UN languages for both reporting and retrieving data (English, French, Spanish, Russian, Arabic and Chinese).

== Capacity Building for participation in the BCH ==
Recognising the importance of Parties to use and participate in the BCH, the Global Environment Facility approved, in March 2004, a USD $13 million project entitled “Building Capacity for Effective Participation in the Biosafety Clearing House (BCH) of the Cartagena Protocol” to assist eligible Parties of the Protocol. 139 countries are eligible for funding under this project.
