= Princeton in Asia =

Affiliated organization of Princeton University

Princeton in Asia (PiA) is an organization that provides transformative, service-oriented experiences for talented graduates with educational institutions, businesses, media organizations, and NGOs throughout Asia. PiA is an independent affiliate of Princeton University, and only about a third of the PiA fellows in recent years have been Princeton alumni. The acceptance rate for the Princeton in Asia program hovers around 10%, making it a competitive application process.

PiA's roots reach back to 1898, when a group of Princeton undergraduates founded "Princeton in Peking" in support of the YMCA in Beijing. Among the best known of the participants was Sidney D. Gamble. Its name was changed to the "Princeton-Yenching Foundation" in 1923. In 1949, China closed its doors to the organization, which turned its efforts towards other parts of Asia and renamed itself "Princeton in Asia" in 1955. (PiA has since reestablished a large presence in China.) PiA hired its first full-time executive director in 1970, and the organization grew dramatically in the 1970s and 1980s. In 2015, PiA placed 142 fellows in nineteen countries, including Cambodia, China/Hong Kong, Timor-Leste, India, Indonesia, Japan, Kazakhstan, Laos, Mongolia, Malaysia, Nepal, Philippines, Singapore, South Korea, Sri Lanka, Taiwan, Thailand, and Vietnam.

Princeton-in-Asia is no longer a missionary organization, but as former PiA executive director Carrie Gordon remarked in 1998, "our mission statement written in 1911 hasn't changed." In 2021, the spirit of the mission remains the same, though it has been updated to the following:

PiA fosters mutual appreciation and cross-cultural understanding between the United States and Asia through immersive work fellowships in host organizations and communities.

== Summer of Service ==
Summer of Service ("SOS") is an annual English immersion program held during the summer at the Normal College of Jishou University in Jishou, Hunan, China. It was founded by a Princeton student, Rory Truex, in 2005 and is sponsored by Princeton in Asia.
