= Doctor to the Barrios =

1970 book by Juan M. Flavier

- Book cover for Juan M. Flavier's Doctor to the Barrios
- Author: Juan M. Flavier
- Language: English
- Genre: Non-fiction
- Publisher: New Day Publishers
- Publication date: 1970
- Publication place: Philippines
- Media type: Print (paperback)

Doctor to the Barrios is a 1970 book written by Juan M. Flavier, a physician in the Philippines, who later became Secretary of the Department of Health and two-term Senator of the Philippines. Its complete title is Doctor to the Barrios, Experiences with the Philippine Rural Reconstruction Movement.

Written in the English language, it was published by New Day Publishers in 1970, as a paperback with 208 pages.

"Barrios" is the older name for what are now called "barangays".

== Contents ==
In this book, Flavier focused on the common problems encountered by Filipinos living in rural areas. It tackles topics related to barriers in obtaining health care such as "low wages, lack of facilities, and medical supply". He also discussed solutions in alleviating the rural people's health problems through the health workers or health care providers, including how to handle superstitious beliefs, through principles of practicality and simplicity.

== Cultural references ==
"Doctors to the barrios" is a common term in the Philippines. When Flavier was Secretary of Health, he instituted a Doctor to the Barrios Program.
