= Ding Xian Experiment =

Chinese project in rural reconstruction

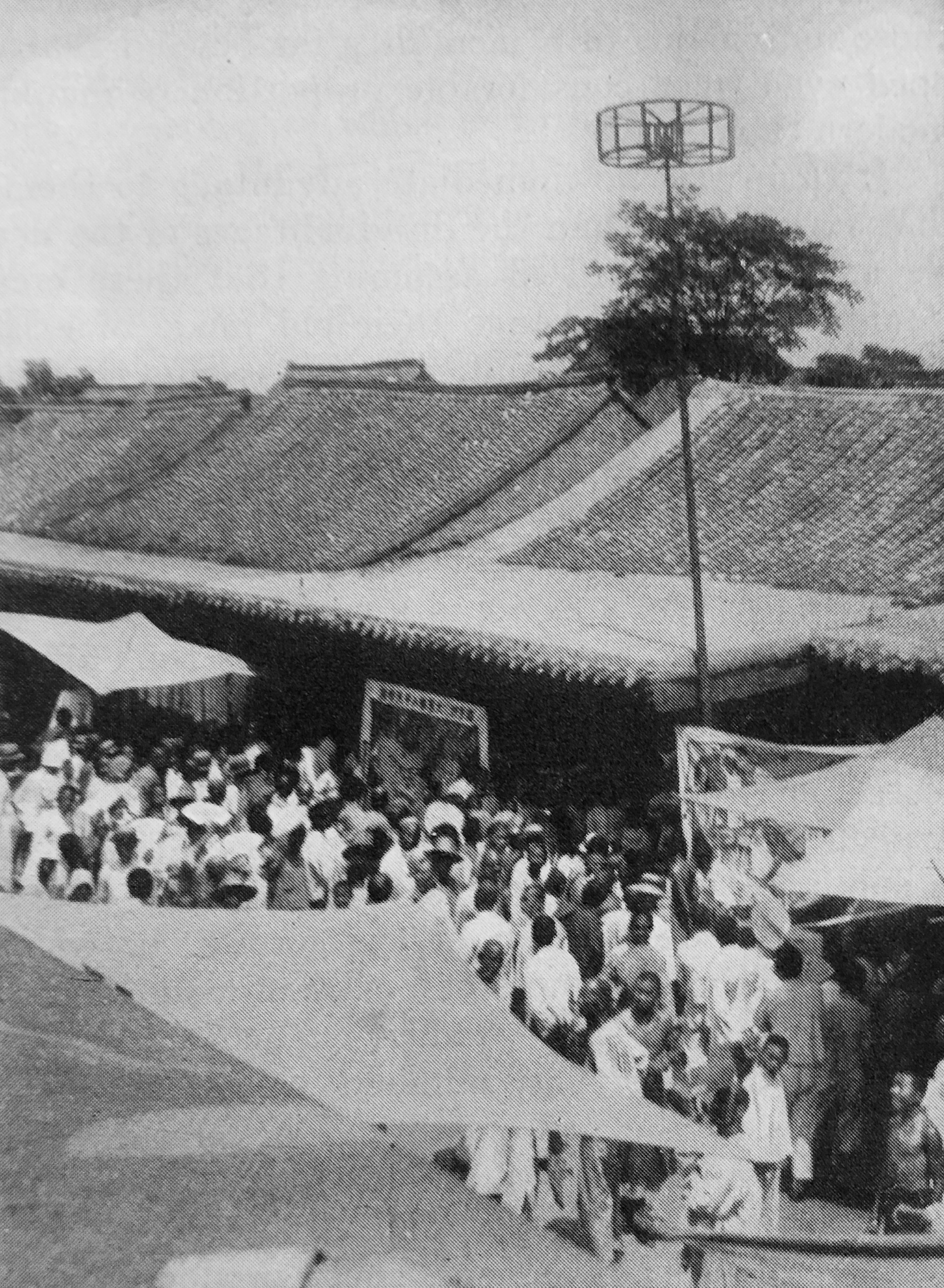
A radio receiver set up as part of the Ding Xian Experiment in 1935. When the picture was taken, lectures were being broadcast by the Mass Education Movement in an attempt to combat illiteracy.

The Ding Xian Experiment (simplified Chinese: 定县实验; traditional Chinese: 定縣實驗; pinyin: Dìng Xiàn shíyàn; Wade–Giles: Ting Hsien shih-yan) during the Republican period of Chinese history was a project in Rural Reconstruction sponsored by James Yen's Mass Education Movement (MEM) 中华平民教育促进会 in Ding Xian (Ding County), Hebei, some 200 miles south of Beijing.

The project was started in 1926 and lasted until the Japanese invasion of 1937. The county was to be a social laboratory in which to develop and demonstrate ways to raise the standard of living, health, political responsibility, and culture of the Chinese village.

Although the program received financial aid from the Rockefeller and other American foundations, Yen and his team of experts aimed to develop affordable techniques and prototypes which could then be made productive all across China using mainly resources from within the village. They hoped to show that the causes of the extremely low standard of living in the Chinese countryside could be addressed by co-operation without class warfare and that violent revolution was not necessary to change village life. Through their work the reformers attempted to produce a way of modernizing the countryside based on local conditions rather than by importing prevailing methods and concepts of Western origins.

== The program ==
In 1926, after developing successful literacy campaigns across the nation, mainly in cities, James Yen and the Mass Education Movement (MEM) decided to start programs in the countryside. The village of Zhaicheng, in Ding Xian (Ding County) in central Hebei, had started a program of local self-government nearly a decade before, and was chosen because of the welcome offered by village elders. The MEM started programs of literacy education, but in spite of original success, one villager explained to Yen, "Dr. Yen, I am grateful to know how to read, but my stomach is just as empty as my illiterate neighbor's." Yen realized that literacy, in fact, no one approach, could address the village's problems. He then identified the "Four Weaknesses" of China as "poverty, ignorance, disease, and misgovernment," and invited Chinese experts to come to live in Ding Xian and design experimental program to address each one of them:

1. The problem of "Ignorance" was to be addressed by village schools and cultural programs which included village drama. among others.
2. The problem of Poverty was to be addressed by farmers' cooperatives, improved agricultural techniques, seeds, and new breeds of plants and animals.
3. The problem of Health was addressed by a pyramidal structure in which Village Health Workers were trained to keep records, treat minor problems, give basic inoculations, and refer more serious cases to clinics in the market towns.
4. Politics. As the work expanded from Zhaicheng village to encompass most of Ding Country, the MEM saw greater and greater need to address political problems such as taxation, land ownership, and corruption. in 1932, the Hebei provincial government turned political control of the county over to the MEM, creating the Hebei Institute for Political and Social Reconstruction (IPSR).

The work at Ding Xian attracted nationwide attention and developed many new techniques for rural development which did not depend on central government control, violent revolution, or large infusions of foreign money. The National Rural Reconstruction Movement held three national conferences involving several hundred government and private projects. James Yen and Liang Shuming were the most prominent leaders.

Most of the rural reconstruction work was halted by the Japanese invasion of Hebei and North China in 1937. But even though reformers left the Ding Xian Experiment, villagers in Ding Xian kept up local government, schools, public health work, and agricultural work as had been intended when MEM programs were designed to be self-sustainable.

== References and further reading ==
- Alitto, Guy (1979). The Last Confucian: Liang Shu-Ming and the Chinese Dilemma of Modernity. Berkeley: University of California Press. ISBN 9780520053182.
- Merkel-Hess, Kate (2016). The Rural Modern: Reconstructing the Self and State in Republican China. Chicago; London: University of Chicago Press. ISBN 9780226383279.
- Merkel-Hess, Kate (2009), "Reading the Rural Modern: Literacy and Morality in Republican China", History Compass, vol. 7, pp. 44–54
- Merkel-Hess, Kate (2012), "Acting out Reform: Theater and Village in the Republican Rural Reconstruction Movement", Twentieth-Century China, vol. 37, pp. 161–180
- Hayford, Charles W. (1990). To the People: James Yen and Village China. New York: Columbia University Press. ISBN 9780231072045.
- Schmalzer, Sigrid (January 2002), "Breeding a Better China: Pigs, Practices, and Place in a Chinese County, 1929-1937", The Geographical Review, 92 (1): 1–22
- Yen, Y. C. James (1934). The Ting Hsien Experiment. Peiping: Chinese National Association of the Mass Education Movement. Reprints: WorldCat
