= New Rural Reconstruction Movement =

Contemporary Chinese movement for rural reconstruction

New Rural Reconstruction (NRR, Chinese: 新乡村建设; pinyin: Xīn xiāngcūn jiànshè) is an intellectual current and social movement initiated by Wen Tiejun and other activists to address the crisis they saw in the Chinese countryside at the start of the 21st century. In 2009, at its core there were several NGOs and academic institutions, dozens of rural cooperatives and associations, and hundreds of participants (including academics, social workers, student volunteers, and grassroots activists). More broadly, the ideas and spirit of NRR have influenced a growing movement of rural experimentation, including many activists who do not use the term "NRR".

== Background ==
The initiators and theorists of NRR, sometimes known as the "New Rural Reconstruction school" (Chinese: 新乡村建设派; pinyin: Xīn xiāngcūn jiànshè pài), felt that the reforms begun by Deng Xiaoping and other CCP leaders in the late 1970s were no longer benefiting rural communities, especially in central and western China, and in some ways hurting them. While most of the NRR school rarely use the term "New Left" to describe themselves, they are generally considered to be an important part of that critical tradition. Like the Chinese New Left in general, the NRR school is critical of the dominant current of utopian marketization, in which the market is seen as a solution to all problems. Instead, NRR supports the creation of rural cooperatives and other forms of cooperative social organization.

NRR grew out of a loosely parallel set of academics, students, state development workers, and grassroots activists. In the early 1990s, a debate grew up over neo-liberal policies, such as those advocated by the World Bank. These critics charged that the success of free market and globalization policies in the short term threatened the long term viability of China's farm families and villages by eroding the remnants of the Mao-era communes, which had provided health, education, and welfare, leaving individual families to fend for themselves in these areas. In addition, urban expansion drove up land prices and local officials confiscated land in order to build factories and housing for the newly affluent. By the middle of the 1990s, in addition to demonstrations against traditional targets such as taxes, there were widespread protests against the corruption of local officials, pollution from the factories (many of which were owned by outside interests), and the gap between the newly rich and the still poor rural areas.

In the late 1980s, Wen Tiejun (then state development worker, now dean of the School of Agricultural Economics and Rural Development at Renmin University) began to theorize and popularize the phrase "sannong wenti" (three rural problems), that is, nongmin (rural people or peasants), nongcun (rural society or villages), and nongye (rural production or agriculture). According to Wen's theory, Mao-era policies such as economic independence from the world capitalist system had been necessary for China to industrialize, but these policies had left the rural population in a weak position. The breakup of the commune system had produced individual plots too small to use technology efficiently and farmers were now at the mercy of market forces and an economic policy which favored exports and the cities over the countryside. To solve these contradictions, further market reforms were not the right strategy. Rural life had to be reconstructed.

Wen Tiejun's influential essay "Deconstructing Modernization" challenged the West's industry-based modernization as an "unreproducible experiment". The West, charged Wen, financed its development with capital from colonies and by controlling global resources, a strategy which was not open to China. Wen's research and travels in developing countries convinced him that China was not alone in facing "three disparities", that is, in rich vs. poor, city vs. countryside, and region vs. region. Wen hoped China's "people-centered scientific approach" and sustainable development would replace the earlier "vulgar growth" and "blind advocacy of consumerism".

Although NRR is mainly conceived as a distinctively Chinese response to the problems of modernization under particular historical conditions, experiences outside of China have also influenced NRR. Negatively, the NRR school aims to avoid the social problems many developing countries have faced due to market-centered development and rapid urbanization – especially rural landlessness, the formation of large sub-proletarian slums, and social unrest. Positively, some members of the NRR school looks to positive lessons from other developing countries that have mitigated these trends through various "alternative development" experiences. Most commonly discussed of these lessons is that of Kerala, India (see the Kerala model). Mainland Chinese NRR advocates learned about Kerala and other foreign experiences mainly through the introduction of Hong Kong scholars and activists, especially Lau Kin Chi and ARENA (Asian Regional Exchange for New Alternatives). In 2001, Lau arranged for Wen Tiejun and other mainland activists to visit the People's Science Movement in Kerala. This movement, they found, took inspiration not only from Gandhi but also from Mao Zedong. Kerala's high life expectancy, literacy, and social equality came not only from party politics and government policies, but also from such popular movements and the mobilization of many trained organizers working from the bottom up and organizing on a community level.

== History ==
Around 2002, some Chinese advocates of rural cooperative experimentation began adopting the term "Rural Reconstruction" from China's 1920s–1930s Rural Reconstruction Movement. The term "NRR" was first publicly used in January 2003, when CSER (China Society of Economic Reform, the think-tank/ publishing house where Wen Tiejun was based at the time) sponsored a national workshop on NRR in Beijing, attended by dozens of grassroots activists as well as supporters from Hong Kong. In July 2003, grassroots activist Qiu Jiansheng founded the James Yen Institute for Rural Reconstruction near the site of James Yen's 1930s Rural Reconstruction center in Dingzhou, along with the support of the local government, CSER, and Lau Kin Chi's China Social Services and Development Research Centre. This became one of two national centers for NRR activities – mainly training student volunteers and grassroots activists on how to set up, run and support projects such as cooperatives – until it closed in 2007. In 2004 the other, still active national center – the Liang Shuming Center for Rural Reconstruction – was founded in Beijing by grassroots activist Liu Xiangbo, also with the support of Wen Tiejun. After Wen left CSER and founded the Rural Reconstruction Center at Renmin University in 2005, the latter replaced CSER as an important institutional and economic base for the Liang Shuming Center and other NRR organizations and activities, such as the Guoren Green Alliance (a marketing network for environmentally-friendly farming cooperatives) and the Little Donkey Farm (one of China's first experiments with community supported agriculture).

Other academic institutions, such as the Center for Rural Governance Studies at Huazhong University of Science and Technology, and other NGOs and networks, such as the Guizhou Association for Community Building and Rural Governance, identify with NRR, although some emphasize their differences from the current of NRR centered on Wen Tiejun and the Liang Shuming Center. Others, and an uncertain but certainly large number of grassroots experiments, have been influenced by NRR without using this term. To complicate matters, since the Chinese government began promoting the policy of "Constructing a New Socialist Countryside" (NSC, Chinese: 建设社会主义新农村; pinyin: jianshe shehuizhuyi xin nongcun) in 2006, many NRR advocates made a subtle switch to the state's term "NSC" instead of "NRR", presenting their views and experiments as "peasant-centered" or "village-community-centered" approaches to NSC. (While this new CCP policy is influenced in part by NRR, it should be primarily understood as an attempt to build the conditions for developing the rural consumer market.)

== Present situation ==
After 2006, therefore, it became more difficult to identify a coherent NRR current or movement because, (1) the original NRR advocates generally stopped using the term, (2) some NRR advocates emphasized their differences from other NRR advocates, and (3) many more activists and experiments were (and continue to be) influenced by one or another strand of NRR without using or even necessarily knowing this term. In order to avoid the political sensitiveness of social movement, the NRR advocates started to call themselves a "network" (网络) instead of a "movement" (运动). Yet, the NRR has been leading various initiatives in sustainable agriculture and alternative food networks such as community-supported agriculture have become a key instrument for the NRR to promote their ideas and philosophy. In the words of Wen Tiejun, NRR has "gone to the grassroots". The popular movements emerging from NRR are still in the process of formation and have yet to be documented.

== See also ==
- Property Law of the People's Republic of China
