= FAO GM Foods Platform =

Online portal

The FAO GM Foods Platform is a web platform where participating countries can share information on their assessments of the safety of genetically modified (recombinant-DNA) foods and feeds based on the Codex Alimentarius. It also allows for sharing of assessments of low-level GMO contamination (LLP, low-level presence).

The platform was set up by the Food and Agriculture Organization of the United Nations, and was launched at the FAO headquarters in Rome on 1 July 2013. The information uploaded to the platform is freely available to be read.

== See also ==
- Agerskovgruppen
- Global Aquaculture Alliance
