= Sino-American Joint Commission on Rural Reconstruction =

Sino-American Joint Commission on Rural Reconstruction (JCRR; Chinese: 中國農村復興聯合委員會; pinyin: Zhōngguó Nóngcūn Fùxīng Liánhé Wěiyuánhuì) is a commission established in 1948 in mainland China. After the Chinese Civil War, the JCRR then moved to Taiwan, where its work has been widely credited with laying the agricultural basis in the 1950s and 1960s for Taiwan's outstanding economic growth in the following decades by a coordinated program of economic, social, and technical development.

== The JCRR on the mainland ==
After intensive lobbying by Y.C. James Yen, the American Congress included a provision in the China Aid Act of 1948 to fund an independent entity which would take advantage of Yen's experience in the Rural Reconstruction Movement. The JCRR was governed by five commissioners, three of whom were Chinese, appointed by the Chinese government, and two of whom were American, appointed by the American president. On the mainland, during the last days of the Chinese Civil War the JCRR carried out a program of rent reduction, guarantee of tenure security, and formation of cooperatives, in addition to expansion of the agronomic and irrigation programs. By one estimate, this was the largest non-Communist land reform program in China before 1949.

== The JCRR and the economic development of Taiwan ==
With the impending defeat of the Chinese Nationalist Party, the JCRR moved to Taiwan, where under the leadership of Chiang Monlin it supervised major land reform, agricultural improvement, and education projects. Since the JCRR was funded from the United States and its salary scale was not governed by government pay schedules, the agency could offer higher pay than the government bureaucracy and attracted highly trained and capable staff. Commissioners included Shen Tsung-han, a graduate of Cornell College of Agriculture. Lee Teng-hui, the future President of the Republic of China and Nationalist Party Chairman, worked as an agricultural economist for the JCRR in the early 1950s.

From 1951 to 1965, around one third of US government aid to Taiwan was directed by the JCRR into agriculture, creating almost two thirds of net domestic capital formation. JCRR programs contributed directly to improving crop and animal stock, development of irrigation and flood control, soil improvement, rural credit programs and cooperatives, health programs, and birth control. The JCRR continued the strategy developed by the Rural Reconstruction Movement on the mainland of coordinating all these programs instead of running them independently one by one. Under the combined stimulus of the land reform and the agricultural development programs, production in agriculture increased at an average annual rate of 4 per cent from 1952 to 1959, greater than the growth in population, which was 3.6 percent. The JCRR is widely credited with creating the basis of agricultural prosperity which led to Taiwan's rapid economic growth in the 1970s and 1980s.

JCRR was combined with the Council of Agriculture when the United States ended the official foreign relation with the Republic of China in 1979.

== See also ==
- Land Reform Museum
- Taiwan Miracle
