= Y. C. James Yen =

Chinese educator and Rural Reconstruction activist

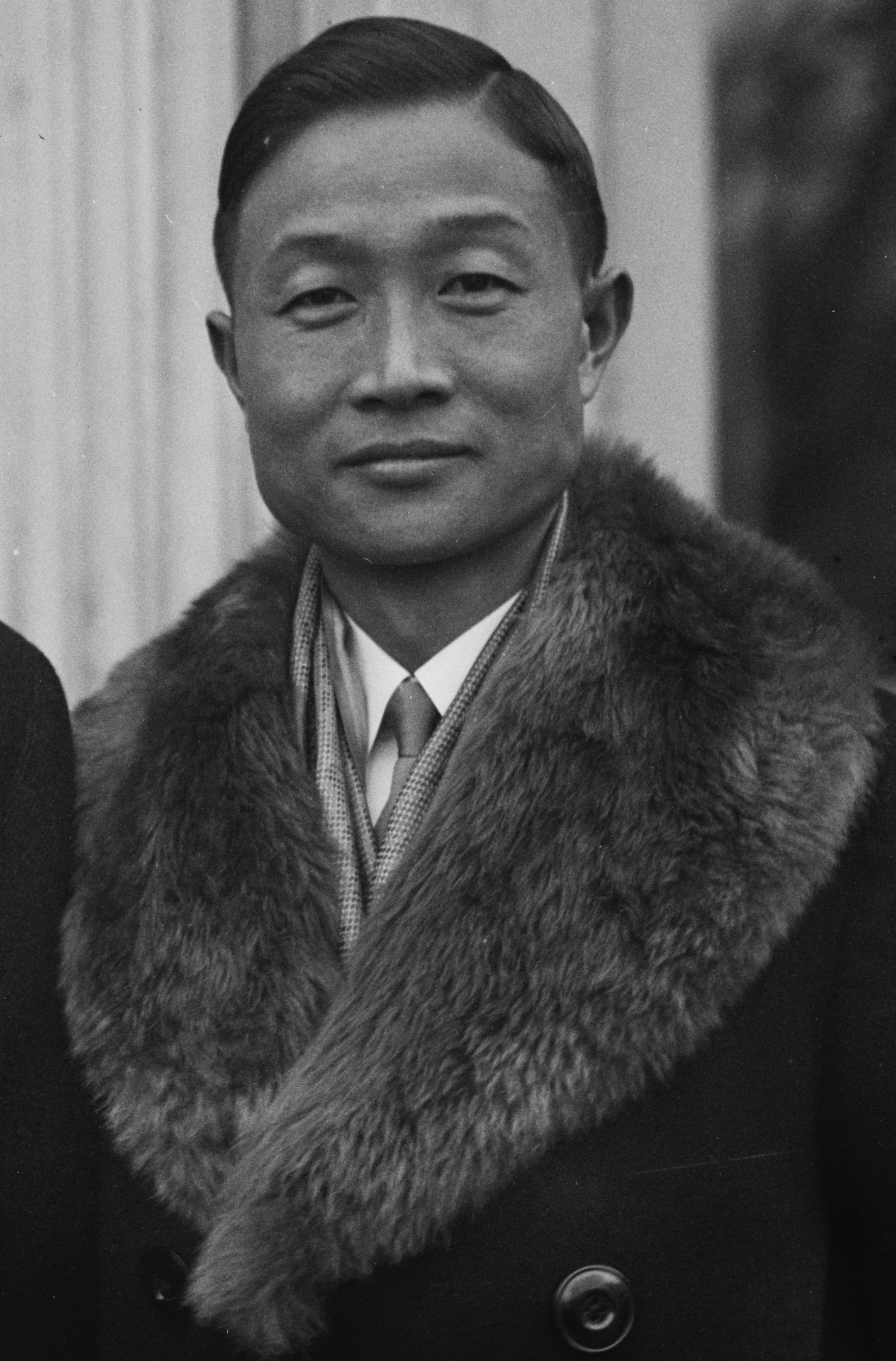
- Y. C. James Yen, pictured during a visit at the White House in 1928.
- Born: Yen Yang-chu; October 16, 1890; Bazhong, Sichuan, Qing Empire
- Died: January 17, 1990 (aged 99); Manhattan, New York City, United States
- Other name: Jimmy
- Education: West China Diocesan College; St. Paul's College, Hong Kong; Hong Kong University; Yale University
- Occupation: Educator
- Spouse: Alice Ordania Yen (née Huie)

Y. C. James Yen (traditional Chinese: 晏陽初; simplified Chinese: 晏阳初; pinyin: Yàn Yángchū; Wade–Giles: Yen Yang-chʽu, October 16, 1890/1893 – January 17, 1990), known to his many English speaking friends as "Jimmy," was a Chinese educator and organizer known for his work in mass literacy and rural reconstruction, first in China, then in many countries.

After working with Chinese laborers in France during World War I, in the 1920s Yen first organized the Chinese National Association of the Mass Education Movement to bring literacy to the Chinese masses, then turned to the villages of China to organize Rural Reconstruction, most famously at Ding Xian, (or, in the spelling of the time, Ting Hsien), a county in Hebei, from 1926-1937. He was instrumental in founding the Joint Commission on Rural Reconstruction in 1948, which then moved to Taiwan. In 1952, Dr. Yen organized the Philippine Rural Reconstruction Movement and in 1960, he established the International Institute of Rural Reconstruction. He returned to China in the 1980s but died in New York in 1990 and was buried with his wife Alice in Silang, Cavite, Philippines at the International Institute of Rural Reconstruction.

Yen was described as a "trans-Pacific liberal," with an "explicitly liberal and democratic allegiance," who appropriated American ideas and techniques for patriotic Chinese uses.

== Biography ==
Born to a scholarly but not wealthy family in Bazhong, Sichuan, in 1890. He is said to have reported that he was born in 1893, three years younger than his actual age, because of his short stature. At the age of 13, Yen was sent to West China Diocesan College (天道學堂), Langzhong (Paoning) run by the China Inland Mission, and received baptism the next year. In 1906, he was transferred to an American Methodist Episcopal Mission school in Chengdu (Chengtu) at the college principal William Henry Aldis's suggestion, there he became friends with James R. Stewart, a young missionary from British Hong Kong and son of Robert Stewart. With Stewart's help, he enrolled at St. Paul's College, Hong Kong in 1913. Yen adopted the name James in memory of James R. Stewart after he died in 1916 in France during the First World War. He later studied at Hong Kong University, and graduated in 1918 from Yale University, where he was a member of Beta Theta Pi fraternity. After graduation he went to France to join the work of the International YMCA with the Chinese Labor Corps in France workers who had been sent to support the Allies in World War I. Working with them to read and write letters, Yen recalled, he found "for the first time in my ignorant intellectual life" the value of the common people of his own country. What they lacked was education. Therefore, Yen wrote a widely copied literacy primer which used 1,000 basic characters.

After earning a master's degree from Princeton University and serving as President of the Chinese Students Christian Association, Yen returned to China in 1921 to head national mass literacy campaigns under the Chinese National YMCA. In 1923, Yen and leading intellectuals such as Liang Qichao, Hu Shih, and Tao Xingzhi formed the National Association of Mass Education Movements (MEM). The MEM organized campaigns across the country which coordinated volunteer teachers, local leaders, and any available location in order to attract students who could not pay high tuitions. Among the volunteer teachers was Mao Zedong. These campaigns attracted more than five million students and served as a model for even more widespread schools.

Yen later recalled that at this time he regarded himself not as a "Christian," which implied membership in a church, but as a "follower of Christ," implying a direct relation with Jesus. He criticized most missionaries for not being in touch with the realities of China but enthusiastically welcomed the support of those Chinese and foreign Christian organizations which addressed the problems of the village.

In 1926, the MEM set up a village campaign in Ding Xian, a county some 200 miles south of Beijing. The Ting Hsien Experiment (in the romanization of the time) used People’s Schools to coordinate innovations ranging from hybrid pigs and economic cooperatives to village dramas and village health workers. Yen joined Liang Shuming and other independent reformers to form a National Rural Reconstruction Movement which included several hundred local and national organizations. The Rural Reconstruction Movement aimed to create a new countryside as the basis for a new Chinese nation. The work at Ding Xian attracted nationwide attention and developed many new techniques for rural development which did not depend on central government control, violent revolution, or large infusions of foreign money.

In 1937 the Japanese invasion drove MEM operations first to Hunan, then to Sichuan, but Yen spent much of the war in Washington, D.C. After 1945, Yen found himself increasingly at odds with the Nationalist government’s military preoccupation; in 1948 he persuaded the American Congress to fund an independent Sino-American Joint Commission on Rural Reconstruction, of which he became one of the commissioners. In 1950, when his work in China was halted by the incoming Communist government, Yen led the Philippine Rural Reconstruction Movement and founded the International Institute of Rural Reconstruction, with headquarters in the Philippines.

After 1949, he was labeled a "henchman of American imperialism" by the Chinese communist regime. In 1985 the Chinese government finally welcomed Yen back to China and acknowledged his immense contribution to Mass Education and Rural Reconstruction. He died in New York City in Jan 1990.

== Legacy ==
In the late 1990s and early 2000s, the New Rural Reconstruction Movement took up Yen's name and legacy to address the problems of the countryside created by the success of the globalized economy. In July 2003, grassroots activists founded the James Yen Institute for Rural Reconstruction in Dingzhou, the site of the MEM's activities before the war.

Yen's charismatic speaking style and forceful personality made him attractive to many groups in China as well as many foreign friends. The China-raised American author Pearl S. Buck published a short book of interviews with Yen, Tell The People; Talks With James Yen About the Mass Education Movement (New York: John Day, 1945).

John Hersey, whose father was a missionary in China who worked with Yen in the 1920s, wrote a novel The Call (New York: Knopf, 1984), which includes an only slightly fictionalized portrait of Yen under the name "Johnny Wu."

== Works ==
- Yen, James Y. C. (1929). China's New Scholar-Farmer. [S.l.]: Chinese National Association of the Mass Education Movement.
- —— (1934). The Ting Hsien Experiment. Peiping: Chinese National Association of the Mass Education Movement.
- —— (1943). Buck, Pearl S. (ed.). Tell the People: Talks with James Yen About the Mass Education Movement. New York: John Day Company. Translated as: Enrong, Song, ed. (2003). 告语人民 (Gao Yu Ren Min) [Tell the People] (in Chinese). Guilin: Guangxi shifan daxue chubanshe. ISBN 9787563337774.
- —— (1980). Enrong, Song (ed.). 晏阳初全集 (Yan Yangchu quanji) [Works of Yan Yangchu]. Changsha, Hunan..

== See also ==
- Protestantism in Sichuan
- Stephen Yang – Sichuanese Quaker and educator
