= Wen Tiejun =

Chinese agricultural economist

- 温铁军
- Born: May 1951 (age 75); Beijing, China
- Occupation: Economist

Academic background
- Education: Renmin University of China; China Agricultural University

Academic work
- Discipline: Agricultural economics
- Sub-discipline: Three Rural Issues
- Institutions: Renmin University of China

Chinese name
- Traditional Chinese: 溫鐵軍
- Simplified Chinese: 温铁军
Transcriptions
Standard Mandarin
- Hanyu Pinyin: Wēn Tiějūn

Wen Tiejun (Chinese: 温铁军; born May 1951) is a Chinese agricultural economist and a professor at the Renmin University of China, who is well-known for his studies in the Three Rural Issues in Mainland China.

== Biography ==
Wen was born in Beijing in May 1951, while his ancestral home in Changli County, Hebei. After graduating from the Journalism Department of the Renmin University of China in 1983, he was sent by the Chinese government to study in the Institute of Social Investigation of the University of Michigan and the World Bank, and then studied at the Columbia University, Cornell University and the University of Southern California. In 2000, he studied at the Duke University, and lectured at Johns Hopkins University, Washington University in St. Louis, the University of California, Berkeley and Carter Center.

After returning to China, Wen studied in both the School of Economics and Management and the Graduate School of China Agricultural University. He successively worked in the Research Office of the General Political Department of the Central Military Commission, the Central Rural Policy Research Office, the Liaison Office of the Rural Development Research Center of the State Council, the Office of the National Rural Reform Experimental Zone, the Rural Economic Research Center of the Ministry of Agriculture, and the China Economic System Reform Research Association.

== Views ==
In the 1990s and early 2000s, Wen critiqued China's approach to rural marketization and nationwide urbanization policies. He criticized state-directed rural modernization and what he viewed as the fetishization of technocratic modernization models.

Wen often expresses his views of sustainable development with reference to the concept of ecological civilization. Wen's approach to ecological civilization emphasizes the need to maintain traditional rural ways of living while supporting income parity, small-scale production, and social justice. As of at least 2023, Wen's interpretations of the ecological civilization concept are a minority view within Chinese political and academic discourse on the subject.

== Publications ==
- 解构现代化：温铁军演讲录 [Deconstruction and Modernization: Wen Tiejun's Speech] (in Chinese). Guangzhou, Guangdong: Guangdong People's Publishing House. 2004. ISBN 9787218045573.
- 三农问题与世纪反思 [Three Rural Issues and Reflections on the Century] (in Chinese). Beijing: Sanlian Bookstore. 2005. ISBN 9787108022639.
- 新农村建设理论探索 [Theoretical Exploration of New Rural Construction] (in Chinese). Beijing: Wenjin Publishing House. 2006. ISBN 9787805545059.
- 新农村建设实践展示 [Demonstration of New Rural Construction Practice] (in Chinese). Beijing: Wenjin Publishing House. 2006. ISBN 9787805545066.
- 农村基层干部科技知识读本 [Science and Technology Knowledge Reader for Rural Grassroots Cadres] (in Chinese). Changsha, Hunan: Hunan Science and Technology Press. 2007. ISBN 9787535750020.
- “三农”问题与制度变迁 ["Three Rural Issues" and Institutional Changes] (in Chinese). Beijing: China Economic Publishing House. 2009. ISBN 9787501786732.
- 中国新农村建设报告 [Report on China's New Rural Construction] (in Chinese). Fuzhou, Fujian: Fujian People’s Publishing House. 2010. ISBN 9787211061556.
- 广东发展模式和经济结构调整战略研究 [A Study on Guangdong's Development Model and Economic Structure Adjustment Strategy] (in Chinese). Beijing: China Agricultural Science and Technology Press. 2010. ISBN 9787802338593.
- 解读苏南 [Interpretation of Southern Jiangsu] (in Chinese). Suzhou, Jiangsu: Suzhou University Press. 2011. ISBN 9787811376500.
- 社会主义新农村的基础设施建设与管理问题研究 [Research on Infrastructure Construction and Management of New Socialist Countryside] (in Chinese). Beijing: Science Press. 2011. ISBN 9787030313737.
- 八次危机：中国的真实经验1949—2009 [Eight Crises: China's Real Experience (1949–2009)] (in Chinese). Shanghai: Oriental Publishing House. 2013. ISBN 9787506055574.
- 我们到底要什么 [What Do We Want] (in Chinese). Beijing: Huaxia Publishing House. 2015. ISBN 9787508034676.
- 告别百年激进 [Farewell to the 100 Years of Radicalism] (in Chinese). Shanghai: Oriental Publishing House. 2016. ISBN 9787506088527.
- 居危思危：国家安全与乡村治理 [National Security and Rural Governance] (in Chinese). Shanghai: Oriental Publishing House. 2016. ISBN 9787506089821.
- 中国农业的生态化转型：社会化生态农业理论与实践 [Ecological Transformation of the Agriculture of China: Theory and Practice of Socialized Ecological Agriculture] (in Chinese). Beijing: China Agricultural Press. 2017. ISBN 9787109224841.
- 乡建笔记：新青与乡村的生命对话 [Notes on Rural Construction: Life Dialogue between New Youth and Rural Areas] (in Chinese). Shanghai: Oriental Publishing House. 2020. ISBN 9787520712545.

=== Co-authored publications ===
- Wen, Tiejun; Xing Hui (2004). 进城务工百事通 [Knowledge Manual for Migrant Workers in Cities] (in Chinese). Beijing: Higher Education Press. ISBN 9787040159080.
- Kong, Xiangzhi; Li, Sufang; Fang Fengwen; Wen, Tiejun (2012). 粮食主销区价格调控问题研究：以北京市为例 [Study on Price Regulation in Main Grain Selling Areas: a Case Study of Beijing] (in Chinese). Beijing: China Agricultural Press. ISBN 9787109159228.
- Zhu, Xinkai; Wen, Tiejun; Kong, Xiangzhi (2013). 中国农村消费市场：理论与实践 [China's Rural Consumer Market: Theory and Practice] (in Chinese). Beijing: China Agricultural Press. ISBN 9787109137271.
- Chen, Weiping; Wen, Tiejun; Kong, Xiangzhi (2013). 中国社区支持农业消费者感知价值的实证研究 [An Empirical Study on the Perceived Value of Chinese community supported agricultural consumers] (in Chinese). Beijing: China Agricultural Press. ISBN 9787109177345.
- 马九杰; Wen, Tiejun; Kong, Xiangzhi (2013). 订单农业与价值链金融：贸易和信贷互联的交易制度及其影响 [Order Agriculture and Value Chain Finance: the Transaction System of Trade and Credit Interconnection and Its Influence] (in Chinese). Beijing: China Agricultural Press. ISBN 9787109164789.
- Zhong, Zhen; Wen, Tiejun; Kong, Xiangzhi (2014). 转型中的奶农合作社研究：基于十余个案例的观察 [Research on Dairy Farmers' Cooperatives in Transition: Based on Observation of More Than Ten Cases] (in Chinese). Beijing: China Agricultural Press. ISBN 9787109191013.
- Zhong, Zhen; Wen, Tiejun; Kong, Xiangzhi; Sun, Juan (2015). 国外乳品质量安全管理体系研究 [A Study on Foreign Dairy Quality and Safety Management System] (in Chinese). Beijing: China Agricultural Press. ISBN 9787109204133.
- Kong, Xiangzhi; 毛飞; 伍振军; Wen, Tiejun (2015). 土地流转与新型农业经营主体培育 [Land Circulation and Cultivation of New Agricultural Management Subjects] (in Chinese). Beijing: China Agricultural Press. ISBN 9787109202795.
- Wen, Tiejun; Yang, Shuai (2016). “三农”与“三治” ["Three Rural Issues" and "Three Governance"] (in Chinese). Beijing: China Renmin University Press. ISBN 9787300231341.
- Wen, Tiejun; Guo, Guanglei (2017). 中国农业的生态化转型：社会化生态农业理论与实践 [Ecological Transformation of the Agriculture of China: Theory and Practice of Socialized Ecological Agriculture] (in Chinese). Beijing: China Agricultural Press. ISBN 9787109224841.
- Wen, Tiejun; Zhang, Xiaode (2018). 乡村振兴十人谈：乡村振兴战略深度解读 [Rural Revitalization: An In-Depth Interpretation of Rural Revitalization Strategy] (in Chinese). Nanchang, Jiangxi: Jiangxi Education Publishing House. ISBN 9787570504138.
- Wen, Tiejun; Pan, Jia'en (2018). 中国乡村建设百图录 [A Hundred Atlas of Rural Construction in China] (in Chinese). Chongqing: Southwest Normal University Press. ISBN 9787562191032.
- Wen, Tiejun; Dong, Xiaodan (2019). 去依附：中国化解第一次经济危机的真实经验 [De Dependence: China's Real Experience in Resolving the First Economic Crisis] (in Chinese). Shanghai: Oriental Publishing House. ISBN 9787520710732.
