= Cambodian Center for Study and Development in Agriculture =

CEDAC (Centre d'Etude et de Development Agricole Cambodgien/Cambodian Center for Study and Development in Agriculture) is an agricultural and rural development organization set up in August 1997 to work for the development of ecologically based family agriculture, and to promote a cooperative and mutual assistance movement in the rural areas of Cambodia. Initial support came from the French non-governmental organization (NGO), GRET (Groupe de Recherches et d'Echanges Technologiques).

The Cambodian Centre for study and development Agriculture, also known as the CEDAC, has a big role when it comes to strengthening the agricultural sector. It does this by allowing smaller farmers to improve their economic knowledge. Farmers Help Group is one of the other organizations that help farmers advocate for their farmers' rights, making sure their voices are heard in policy discussions. As a result, it helps farmers have a sense of unity that reduces exploitation by unnecessary people and it creates a more equal opportunity. Additionally, they also provide extensive training on how to have more sustainable farming techniques, for farmers to increase their knowledge by also keeping their natural way of doing it. This collective approach not only boosts incomes in the long run but also encourages long-term agricultural sustainability.

One important benefit of the cooperatives is their ability to improve profits through the shared resources and bulk marketing. In Cambodia, there is a cooperative organization that, as reported by Open Health News, helps farmers increase their earnings by reducing production costs and improving market linkages. By merging resources such as, smallholder farmers access better seeds, fertilizers, and equipment at lower prices. These cooperatives also negotiate directly with specific buyers, ensuring that the farmer receives fair prices for produce Open Health News. This model is particularly effective in rural areas, where individual farmers often lack bargaining power, thereby contributing to poverty reduction and rural economic growth.

Research from the Cambodia Development Resource Institute CDRI emphasizes cooperatives' role in promoting climate-resilient agriculture. In Cambodia climate change has caused several problems/ challenges in regarding unpredictable rainfall and soil degradation. Many Cooperatives have been providing training on climate-smart practices, such as crop diversification and water-efficient irrigation. Initiatives like those are documented by Cambodia's National Council for Sustainable Development also known as the NCSD. They further show how cooperatives facilitate the access to the government and NGO support for sustainable farming projects NCSD 2. This is resulting in farmers gaining more knowledge and resources about cooperatives helping them build resilience against environmental shocks, ensuring food security.

Farmer cooperatives can help advance Cambodia’s agricultural sector by improving quality of life, increasing farmers' market access, and promoting sustainability. These cooperatives enable small-scale farmers to overcome economic and environmental challenges. Still, greater investment and policy support are crucial to be able to expand these initiatives. Strengthening these cooperatives will benefit farmers and support Cambodia’s broader economic development, making agriculture more viable and sustainable.

== See also ==
- Agriculture in Cambodia
