= Liang Shuming =

Chinese philosopher (1893–1988)

Liang Shuming 梁漱溟
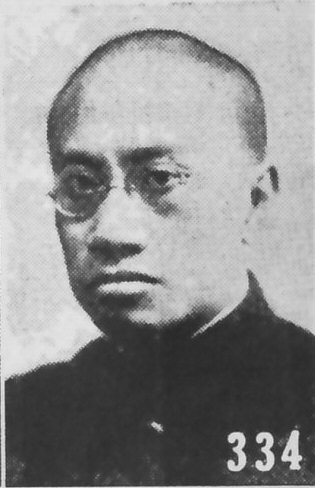
- Born: Liang Huanding 梁煥鼎; 18 October 1893; Beijing, Qing Empire
- Died: 23 June 1988 (aged 94); Beijing, People's Republic of China
- Other names: Liang Shouming 梁壽銘; Liang Shouming 梁壽名; Liang Shoumin 梁瘦民
- Title: Principal of Guangdong Guangya Middle School
- Term: 1928–1929
- Political party: China Democratic League
- Opponents: Feng Youlan; Mao Zedong

Liang Shuming (Chinese: 梁漱溟; pinyin: Liáng Shùmíng, Wade-Giles Liang Shu-ming; sometimes Liang Sou-ming, October 18, 1893 – June 23, 1988), born Liang Huanding (梁焕鼎), courtesy name Shouming (壽銘), was a Chinese philosopher, politician, and writer in the Rural Reconstruction Movement during the late Qing dynasty and early Republican eras of Chinese history.

== Biography ==
Liang was born in Beijing. His family were ethnic Mongolians of Guilin and Guangxi origin. He was the son of a famous intellectual who committed suicide apparently in despair at the state of the Chinese nation. He had a modern education and exposure to Western writings. Liang was always fascinated by Buddhism, but never joined a monastery due to the opposition of his father. At the age of sixteen, he refused to allow his mother to discuss marriage on his behalf and at nineteen he became a vegetarian, remaining so for the rest of his life.

In 1917 he was recruited by Cai Yuanpei to the philosophy department of Beijing University, where he produced an influential book based on his lectures entitled Eastern and Western Cultures and their Philosophies, which expounded some of the doctrines of a modern Confucianism. He also displayed the influence of Henri Bergson, then popular in China, as well as Buddhist Yogachara philosophy. Although Liang had abandoned his determination to become a monk in 1920 and his celibacy in 1921, Buddhism influenced him for the rest of his life.

Regarding Western civilization as doomed to eventual failure, Liang did not advocate complete reform and adoption of Western institutions. He nonetheless believed that reform was needed to make China equal to the rest of the world. It was his view that the required prerequisites for these institutions did not exist in China, so they would not succeed if introduced. Instead, he pushed for change to socialism starting at the grassroots level. To this end, he founded the Shandong Rural Reconstruction Institute and helped to found the China Democratic League.

Liang was famous for his critique of Marxist class theory, stating that, despite obvious disparities of wealth, Chinese rural society could not be unambiguously classified along class lines. One and the same family (particularly the large patriarchal lineages found in many regions) would commonly have some members among the "haves" and others among the "have-nots". The class struggle advocated by the Maoists would necessitate kinsmen attacking each other.

After the Sino-Japanese War, he mediated disputes between the Communist and Nationalist parties. After the victory of the Communists in 1949, he was occasionally persecuted in ideological campaigns, but refused to admit any error. He died in Beijing.

== Published works ==
Released in 1921, Eastern and Western Cultures and their Philosophies expounded on Liang's theory of three cultures. This was one of four main Neo-Confucian responses to Scientism. His theory stemmed from Yogachara Buddhism's three natures. His theory was based in his definition of the formation of distinct cultures. In Liang's book he states: "What is culture? It is the life-style of a people. What is life? It is the expression of inexhaustible will—something quite close to the will in Schopenhauer—always being satisfied and yet not fully satisfied".

According to Liang, will decides life and life decides culture, so cultures are different when the wills and desires of the people who populate them differ. Liang saw three orientations of the will: the desire 1) to change and affect your surroundings to bend to your will 2) to change your will so you do not desire to change your surroundings 3) to eliminate will entirely so one no longer desires anything because of his understanding that much of the world is an illusion. To Liang, the three orientations of will were not unconnected but a progression. He says that since knowledge starts with applying reason to your surroundings the first orientation is the most formative. This leads to an imbalance, where one must start to use intuition to relate morally to the world. Finally, as intuition develops, it leads to hardship instead of relieving it. This leads to direct perception, which is the third orientation. Liang maintained that the West held the first orientation, while China held the second and India held the third.

Liang's perspective, influenced by his observations of World War I, was that the West had achieved economic growth by conquering nature, but in doing so it had cut itself of from the wider perspective on humanity maintained by the Confucian tradition.

In his book The Substance of Chinese Culture, Liang contrasted Chinese culture with that of Western culture. He did this by exploring the relationship between the social structures in the two regions. Social structure, he asserted, created the cultural factors determining everything about the two cultures. He said Social structure is heavily influenced by cultural viewpoint, which in turn is defined by the social foundation of the society (its means of existence). Liang believed society had three forms: communities, families and individuals. A cultural viewpoint that heavily emphasizes one combination of these will differ greatly from a viewpoint that emphasizes different ones.

Liang believed that while China had stressed the importance of family, the West focused on the relationship of the individual to the community. He said this led China down a path dedicated to an ethics-based society, while the West produced an individual-based society instead. China was led down its path because of feelings of kinship and emotional bonds, which dominated their society. The West, due to their emphasis on mutual rights, proceeded down a path revolving around class distinction, economic independence and laws. The Chinese, however, had a society of professional divisions due to greater social mobility, mutual responsibility and personal bonds to maintain order. Finally, Liang brings up his three cultures theory and China's position in it. He states that although China was in the second stage, it had skipped the first, and consequently lacked the development of profit and power. Rather than suggesting China go back to the first cultural stage, Liang suggests the introduction of Western science and democracy into Chinese society to promote development in those areas.

== Rural reconstruction ==
Liang Shuming believed that the rural village was the most important aspect of Chinese society and that for the last hundred years Chinese history had been characterized by its destruction. Between the years of 1931 and 1937 Liang was instructing the rural reconstruction in Zouping County of the Shandong Province. Many people assert that he was the reason for the great improvements witnessed there. His main emphases in rural reconstruction were the cultivation of group unity, development of science and technology, and the elimination of outdated traditions.

Liang, appointed by Han Fuju to engage in rural reconstruction in Zouping County, was convinced the most effective method would be to integrate county and village schools and the local government. Between 1931 and 1933 Liang trained 800 people to run schools all over Shandong and in 1932 the Guomindang said that every province should have one of these rural research reconstruction institutions.

Liang's Rural Research Reconstruction Institution had three departments. The first was the Research Department on Rural Reconstruction, headed by Liang Himself. This department trained students who already had a university education to become science advisors. The Training Department of Service personnel took students with a middle-school education to become the villages' service personnel. The final department, called the Rural Reconstruction District, was implemented to integrate local governance into the university.

== Buddhism and Confucianism ==
At the age of 89 in an interview with Guy Alitto, Liang proclaimed himself a Buddhist. He had been interested in Buddhism since his youth, which he often attributed to his feelings that many of the mistakes of the past had been made due to a focus on the external world for answers that come from within. In his article "DOUBT", Liang expounded on the theory of ether in physics to maintain that much of the world is illusory and one must simply be conscious of this fact in order to see the world as it truly is and attain freedom. Liang wrote an "Introduction to Indian Philosophy" where he explored key concepts in Buddhism. In "CONC", he explored the history of consciousness in Buddhism and attributed the Consciousness-Only school to Asanga. He also maintained that people only get an illusory image through observations and opposed the idea of logical inference on the basis that it only explains conceptual questions.

Liang was critical of Chinese folk religion. He believed that it was primitive to allow society to reach a high level of socialization while at the same time promoting conservatism that impeded social development and promoted low moral standards and selfishness. He felt that Confucianism was China's answer to religion as it provided a way to harmonize with the cosmos instead of being isolated from that which you worship.

In contrasting Confucianism with religions he came to two conclusions. First that unlike western religion everyone is thought to have innate moral reason, which means they must not all have uniform morals dictated by an institution like the church. Second, in his "Treatise on the Differences and Similarities between Confucianism and Buddhism" that the two were not unrelated, but while Confucianism is based on the person and talks about moral character, that Buddhism transcends the person to talk about a final understanding. When ordered in 1974 to criticize Confucius and Lin Biao, he refused and instead wrote Human Mind and Human Life. He was often considered a beacon of intellectual freedom as well as China's conscience.

== See also ==
- Chinese philosophy
- Religion in China

== Bibliography ==
- Alitto, Guy. The Last Confucian: Liang Shu-ming and the Chinese Dilemma of Modernity 2nd ed. 1986, University of California Press.
- de Bary, Wm. Theodore, (ed.) Sources of Chinese Tradition, Volume II (Second Edition) New York: Columbia, 2000.
