= Chinese National Association of the Mass Education Movement =

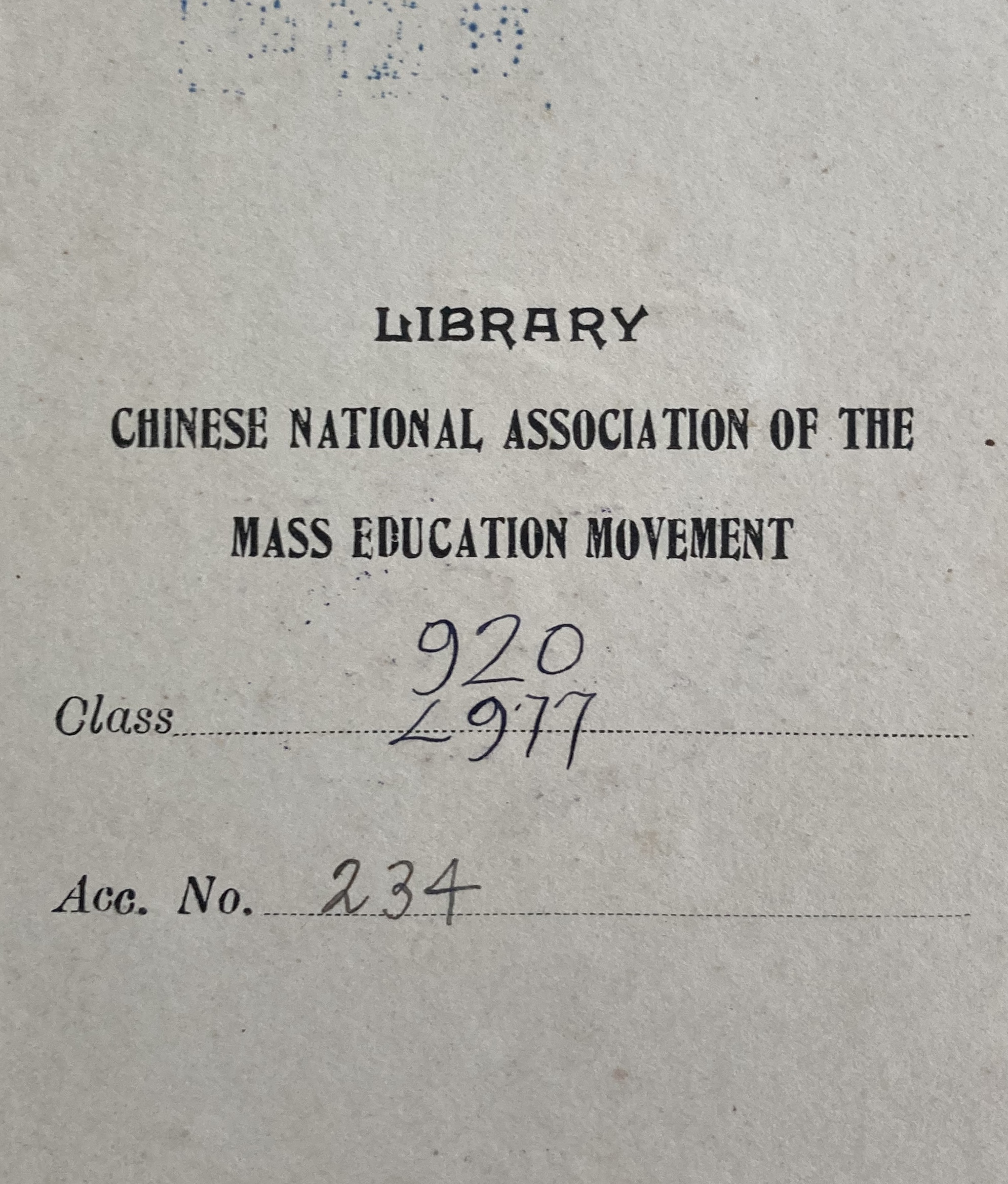
Ex-libris plate from a book owned by the association

Chinese National Association of the Mass Education Movement (Traditional Chinese: 中華平民教育促進會, Simplified Chinese: 中华平民教育促进会), was founded in 1923 with the aim of using popular, accessible education as a means of societal reform, by Tao Xingzhi, Zhu Qihui, and Y. C. James Yen and educational representatives from various provinces. Initially based in Beijing, branches were successively established in more than 20 provinces and regions across the country, where they opened schools for the common people in rural areas. Zhu Qihui served as the chairwoman, Tao Xingzhi was the secretary of the board of directors, and Yan Yangchu was the general secretary.

== Ding Xian Experiment ==
In the 1926, James Yen chose Ding Xian in Hebei as the "North China Experimental Zone", to engage in popular education and rural construction, in a pioneering project known as Ding Xian Experiment. The Ding County experiment was halted due to the outbreak of the Second Sino-Japanese War, when James Yen moved to Chongqing to continue his work in popular education.
