= Agerskovgruppen =

Danish agricultural activist group

Agerskovgruppen (lit. 'The Agerskov Group') is an activist association of farmers in Denmark. It was formed in January 2011 by two Southern Jutland farmers, Jens Peter Aggesen and Thorkild Fink, who were dissatisfied with the regulation of agriculture resulting from water area plans and with Lars Løkke Rasmussen I Government's Green Growth Plan. The association takes its name from the village of Agerskov in Southern Jutland, and the historic Agerskov Inn is the association's base, where it holds some of its meetings.

Agerskovgruppen has organized several tractor demonstrations over time and has threatened to block Copenhagen with tractors if the Parliament passes a CO_{2} tax on agricultural emissions of greenhouse gases.

== Organization and Membership ==
Agerskovgruppen was originally an informal network but was transformed into a formal association in 2020 when the group sued the state over a case concerning after-crop requirements. Except for a brief period in 2017, Jens Peter Aggesen has been the chairman throughout the years.

As of 2024, the group has about 200 members. It has organized so-called storm meetings in Agerskov with between 250 and 800 participating farmers. In total, there are about 7,500 farmers in Denmark.

== Activism ==
The association is considered a more radical and activist agricultural organization compared to the dominant organization Landbrug & Fødevarer and Landsforeningen for Bæredygtigt Landbrug, which are themselves usually seen as a critical opposition to Landbrug & Fødevarer. Agerskovgruppen has therefore organized several tractor demonstrations, both in the local area and in Copenhagen.

Some of Agerskovgruppen's members also pay membership fees to Bæredygtigt Landbrug. Agerskovgruppen's chairman Jens Peter Aggesen was previously a member of Bæredygtigt Landbrug but left in 2024 when BL introduced an ethical code for the association's meetings after Agerskovgruppen's vice-chairman Holger Iversen, at a meeting with economics professor Michael Svarer, chairman of the Svarer Committee on a green tax reform, had suggested that in earlier times someone like the professor would have been hanged.

Agerskovgruppen does not trust calculations from biologists and climate experts about proposals to reduce agricultural emissions of nitrogen through fields to the sea and the effects of CO_{2} taxes. In 2024, the group threatened to move against Christiansborg and block Copenhagen with tractors if Parliament introduced a CO_{2} tax on greenhouse gas emissions from agriculture.
