= Rural Reconstruction Movement =

Rural reform and development movement in Republican China

The Rural Reconstruction Movement was started in China in the 1920s by Y.C. James Yen, Liang Shuming and others to revive the Chinese village. They strove for a middle way, independent of the Nationalist government but in competition with the radical revolutionary approach to the village espoused by Mao Zedong and the Chinese Communist Party.

== History ==
Yen's Ting Hsien (Ding Xian) Experiment in Dingzhou, Hebei and Liang's school at Zouping, Shandong, were only the earliest and most prominent of hundreds of village projects, educational foundations, and government zones which aimed to change the Chinese countryside. After 1931, the Nanking government offered qualified support but placed restrictions on the expansion of its work. American Christian missionaries gave their enthusiastic support. The movement was prominent in building Chinese resistance to Japan during the latter's invasions by strengthening the village economy, culture, and political structure, including pioneering work in village health. Many social activists who participated in this movement were graduated as professors of the United States. They made tangible but limited progress in modernizing the tax, infrastructural, economic, cultural, and educational equipment and mechanisms of rural regions until the cancellation of government coordination and subsidies in the mid-to-late 1930s due to rampant wars and the lack of resources. The rural reconstructive activists advocated a “third way” between the communist violent land reform and the reformism of the Nationalist Government based on the respect of human rights and individual liberties for educational doctrine.

After the outbreak of the Second Sino-Japanese War, Rural Reconstruction activists formed the Rural Reconstruction Party, at first an important part of the China Democratic League but then rendered politically irrelevant in the emerging war between the Chinese Communists and the Chinese Nationalists. In 1948, however, James Yen persuaded the US Congress to fund the Sino-American Joint Commission on Rural Reconstruction. Before moving to Taiwan, the JCRR carried out the largest land reform project carried out in mainland China before 1949, as well as health and education projects. In Taiwan in the 1950s, the JCRR was key in laying the rural foundation for the quick economic growth of the 1960s and the 1970s.

The rural reconstruction movement started by Dr. Yen continues to be active in Asia, Africa, and Latin America. The International Institute of Rural Reconstruction (IIRR) had headquarters in the Philippines and celebrated its 50th anniversary in 2010.

In the 1990s, several academics and social reformers in China started a New Rural Reconstruction Movement, with stations at Ding County and Zouping.

== See also ==
- New Life Movement
- Y. C. James Yen
- Nanjing Decade
