= Zheng Jue =

Zheng Jue (鄭玨) was an official of the Chinese dynasty Tang dynasty and the succeeding Later Liang and Later Tang of the Five Dynasties and Ten Kingdoms period, serving as a chancellor during both Later Liang and Later Tang.

== Background ==
It is not known when or where Zheng Jue was born. He was a grandnephew to the Tang dynasty official Zheng Qi, who served as a chancellor during the reign of Emperor Zhaozong of Tang. Zheng Jue's father Zheng Hui (鄭徽) served as an assistant to the late-Tang warlord Zhang Quanyi, who served as the mayor of and controlled the Tang eastern capital Luoyang during those years. Zheng Jue passed the imperial examinations in the Jinshi class during Emperor Zhaozong's Guanghua era (898–901). (It was said that previously, he had failed the Jinshi examinations repeatedly, but Zhang, whom he was depending on (suggesting, but not conclusively indicating, that his father Zheng Hui was deceased by this point), interceded for him with the testing authorities, such that he was given a pass.) For the rest of the Tang dynasty, he served successively as a copyeditor at Hongwen Pavilion (弘文館), an assistant at Jixian Institute (集賢院), and an imperial censor with the title Jiancha Yushi (監察御史).

== During Later Liang ==
After Tang fell and was succeeded by Later Liang, Zheng Jue served initially as a Bujue (補闕, a low-level consultant in the imperial government), then an imperial chronicler (起居郎, Qiju Lang), then an imperial scholar (翰林學士, Hanlin Xueshi), then the deputy minister of rites (禮部侍郎, Libu Shilang). It was said that throughout Zheng's career, Zhang Quanyi exerted his influence to aid Zheng in his promotions. Zheng was also known for writing beautifully and elegantly.

In 916, during the reign of Later Liang's third and final emperor Zhu Zhen, Zheng Jue was made Zhongshu Shilang (中書侍郎, the deputy head of the legislative bureau of government (中書省, Zhongshu Sheng)) and given the designation Tong Zhongshu Menxia Pingzhangshi (同中書門下平章事), making him a chancellor. In 923, as the Later Liang capital Daliang was left defenseless as Later Liang prepared a massive four-prong attack against its rival north of the Yellow River, Later Tang, Later Tang's emperor Li Cunxu launched a surprise attack on Daliang itself. When Zhu realized it and summoned his officials for a last-ditch strategy session, Zheng suggested that Zhu give him the imperial seal and let him head toward the Later Tang camp, claiming to be surrendering, to see if that would slow the Later Tang advance. Zhu himself was skeptical as to whether this would work, and Zheng then admitted that there was no likelihood for success, drawing laughter from others. With Li Cunxu's army approaching Daliang, Zhu committed suicide, ending Later Liang.

== During Later Tang ==
After Later Tang's conquest of Later Liang, Li Cunxu, who saw himself as the legitimate successor to Tang, exiled a number of Later Liang officials who were from Tang aristocratic families, to punish them for, he reasoned, betraying Tang. As part of these exiles, Zheng Jue was sent to Lai Prefecture to serve as its census officer. Shortly thereafter, he was slightly promoted to be the military advisor to the prefect of Cao Prefecture (曹州, in modern Heze, Shandong). Nevertheless, Zhang Quanyi, who had become an honored Later Tang official after submitting to Later Tang, was interceding for him with Li's chief of staff Guo Chongtao, trying to get him made chancellor again; instead, though, he was made an advisor to the Crown Prince — an honorary position as there was no crown prince at that time.

In 926, Li Cunxu was killed in a mutiny at then-capital Luoyang. His adoptive brother Li Siyuan, who had previously rebelled against him, arrived at Luoyang shortly after and became emperor. Shortly after, the general Ren Huan returned from a campaign against Former Shu, and was expected to be made chancellor. Li Siyuan's chief of staff An Chonghui, not wanting Ren to serve as chancellor alone, sought to have someone else serve with Ren. An's close associate Kong Xun recommended Zheng, claiming that during Zheng's service as Later Liang chancellor, he was cautious and lenient, capable of writing, and capable of judging character. An thus recommended Zheng to Li Siyuan. Subsequent, Li Siyuan made Ren and Zheng chancellors.

Meanwhile, as shortly after two other chancellors that Li Cunxu had commissioned, Doulu Ge and Wei Yue, were removed from their offices, there were talks of more chancellor commissions. Kong recommended Cui Xie to An, while Ren recommended Li Qi. However, both Zheng and Kong disliked Li Qi, which led to disputes between them and Ren. Eventually, Li Siyuan commissioned Cui and Feng Dao as chancellors.

In 928, Zheng, who was then, in addition to being chancellor, also serving as Menxia Shilang (門下侍郎, deputy head of the examination bureau (門下省, Menxia Sheng)) and minister of justice (刑部尚書, Xingbu Shangshu), requested retirement. Li Siyuan gave him the title of Zuo Pushe (左僕射) and allowed him to retire. Li Siyuan also gave him the honorary title of Kaifu Yitong Sansi (開府儀同三司) and granted him an estate at Zheng Prefecture (鄭州, in modern Zhengzhou, Henan). He died early in Li Siyuan's Changxing era (930–933) and was given posthumous honors.

== Notes and references ==
- Old History of the Five Dynasties, vol. 58.
- New History of the Five Dynasties, vol. 54.
- Zizhi Tongjian, vols. 272, 275, 276.
