= Kong Xun =

Kong Xun (Chinese: 孔循) (884-April 4, 931), known early in his life as Zhao Yinheng (趙殷衡), also having used surnames of Li (李) and Zhu (朱) early in life, was an official of the Chinese Five Dynasties and Ten Kingdoms period states Later Liang and Later Tang. He became prominent during the reign of Emperor Mingzong of Later Tang due to his alliance with Emperor Mingzong's trusted advisor An Chonghui, but later had a fallout with An, was ejected from the central government, and would not return to it toward the end of his life.

== Background ==
Kong Xun was born in 884, during the reign of Emperor Xizong of Tang, but his ancestry and home territory has been lost to history, as was his original personal name. He became an orphan early in his life, and gradually ended up in Bian Prefecture (汴州, in modern Kaifeng, Henan). He was taken into the household of a rich man named Li Rang (李讓), and Li raised him as an adoptive son. Later, when Zhu Quanzhong became the military governor (Jiedushi) of Xuanwu Circuit (宣武, headquartered at Bian Prefecture), Li became an adoptive son of Zhu's, and so Kong also changed his family name to Zhu. As he grew older, he served in Zhu Quanzhong's army, and became favored by a wet nurse of one of Zhu Quanzhong's sons. She thus took him as an adoptive son, and as her husband's family name was Zhao, Kong took the family name of Zhao and a new personal name of Yinheng.

In 904, Zhu Quanzhong, who then had Emperor Zhaozong of Tang under his control, forced the Tang emperor to move the capital from Chang'an to Luoyang, which was more firmly under his control. Once Emperor Zhaozong arrived in Luoyang, all of the palace personnel were commissioned by Zhu, so that Zhu could tightly control the palace affairs. Zhao Yinheng became one of the deputy directors of palace affairs (宣徽副使, Xuanhui Fushi), under the director Wang Yin (王殷). While serving in that office, he participated in plotting, at Zhu's order, the assassination of Emperor Zhaozong in late 904, along with Jiang Xuanhui (蔣玄暉) and Zhang Tingfan (張廷範). (Emperor Zhaozong was succeeded by his young son Emperor Ai.)

== During the reign of Emperor Ai of Tang ==
In 905, Zhu Quanzhong was in preparation of seizing the imperial throne. Jiang Xuanhui, Zhang Tingfan, and another of Zhu's associates, the chancellor Liu Can, thus were preparing various traditional ceremonial steps for the dynastic transition, including the creation of Zhu to a princely title greater than the Prince of Liang title that he carried at that time and also the bestowment of the nine bestowments. Zhu, however, was impatient and wanted the transition to be speeded up. Wang Yin and Zhao Yinheng were jealous of Jiang and wanted to replace him, and so they submitted false accusations to Zhu stating that Jiang and Liu were using these ceremonies to try to extend Tang's dynastic life, hoping for a change in circumstances. Zhu believed in the accusations, and shortly after had Jiang, Liu, and Zhang arrested and executed. Wang and Zhao then further falsely accused Emperor Ai's mother Empress Dowager He of having an affair with Jiang; she thereafter was also killed by Wang and Zhao under secret order from Zhu. Zhu thereafter had Emperor Ai yield the throne to him in 907, ending Tang and starting a new Later Liang as its Emperor Taizu.

== During Later Liang ==
Sometime during Later Liang, Zhao Yinheng changed his family name back to Kong and took a new personal name of Xun. Among the offices he served in were defender of Ru Prefecture (汝州, in modern Zhumadian, Henan), general of the imperial guards, and director of material pricing (租庸使, Zuyongshi), but it is not clear what the exact progression of his offices were.

== During Later Tang ==
=== During Emperor Zhuangzong's reign and aftermaths ===
After Later Liang was destroyed by its archrival Later Tang in 923, Kong Xun became a subject of Later Tang's Emperor Zhuangzong, and as of 924 was serving as a general of the imperial guards. That year, the Later Tang director of material pricing Wang Zhengyan (王正言) suffered a stroke. Under the recommendation of Emperor Zhuangzong's favored performer Jing Jin (景進), Emperor Zhuangzong promoted Wang's deputy Kong Qian to be director, with Kong Xun serving as his deputy. For the rest of Emperor Zhuangzong's reign, Kong Qian became known for inflicting heavy taxation on the people so that he could increase the emperor's personal wealth, which caused the people's anger against Emperor Zhuangzong; how much involvement Kong Xun had in Kong Qian's oppressive tax scheme is unclear.

As of 926, Kong Xun was serving as the acting prefect of Bian Prefecture, when Emperor Zhuangzong was facing multiple rebellions against him due to the resentment of the people and his own generals. One of the chief rebels was Emperor Zhuangzong's adoptive brother Li Siyuan, who had rebelled at Yedu (鄴都, in modern Handan, Hebei) (under duress by his own subordinates, according to traditional sources). Li Siyuan was advancing south from Yedu toward Bian Prefecture, while Emperor Zhuangzong was trying to head from the capital Luoyang to Bian Prefecture to cut off Li Siyuan's advance. Kong decided to play both sides, so he sent emissaries to both Emperor Zhuangzong and Li Siyuan welcoming them, while secretly informing his subordinates, "Whoever gets here first will get to enter." Li Siyuan arrived at Bian Prefecture first, so he welcomed Li Siyuan into the city. When Emperor Zhuangzong realized this, he returned to Luoyang, where he was then killed in a mutiny headed by the officer Guo Congqian (郭從謙). Li Siyuan subsequently entered Luoyang and was initially declared regent (while Li Siyuan was still pondering whether to take the throne himself or to offer the throne to Emperor Zhuangzong's son Li Jiji, who was then returning from the campaign in which Later Tang forces conquered Former Shu). Under the recommendation of Li Siyuan's ally Li Shaozhen, Li Siyuan made Kong Xun his chief of staff (Shumishi) when the carryover chief of staff Zhang Juhan requested retirement. Shortly after, when Li Jiji's own officers turned against him, Li Jiji committed suicide, so Li Siyuan prepared to take the throne. Li Shaozhen and Kong advocated that he end the use of the Tang dynastic name, but under the advice of the official Li Qi, Li Siyuan decided to retain the Tang dynastic name, taking the throne in the role of Emperor Zhuangzong's heir (as Emperor Mingzong).

=== During Emperor Mingzong's reign ===
Shortly after Emperor Mingzong took the throne, the Bian Prefecture officer Zhang Jian (張諫) started a mutiny there, but the mutiny was quickly suppressed by the general Li Yanrao (李彥饒). Emperor Mingzong briefly put Kong Xun in charge of Bian Prefecture, and he arrested the mutineers' family members — some 3,000 households — and slaughtered them.

Meanwhile, Kong developed an alliance with fellow chief of staff An Chonghui, who was a close associate of Emperor Mingzong's and who was very powerful in his administration. As An believed that Kong was experienced in dealing with administrative matters, he often listened to Kong's suggestions. After Emperor Mingzong removed the carryover chancellors Doulu Ge and Wei Yue, he was considering whom to commission as chancellors. Kong did not like the idea of having more chancellors from north of the Yellow River (i.e., from the region of Later Tang's predecessor state Jin, as opposed to the former Later Liang realm south of the Yellow River), and so was recommending Zheng Jue and Cui Xie, while the chancellor Ren Huan recommended Li Qi. Zheng was made chancellor, but Kong wanted Cui to be made chancellor as well, and so accused Li Qi of corruption. As a result, Emperor Mingzong commissioned Cui and Feng Dao as chancellors in spring 927. Shortly after, Emperor Mingzong also gave chancellor designations to An and Kong.

After Emperor Zhuangzong's death, Gao Jixing the military governor of Jingnan Circuit (荊南, headquartered in modern Jingzhou, Hubei) the Prince of Nanping, who was already acting somewhat independently of the imperial government, became even more independent-acting, including attacking nearby prefectures and taking them under his control. Emperor Mingzong, in anger, declared a general campaign against Gao, with the general Liu Xun (劉訓) in command. Liu put Jingnan's capital Jiangling under siege, but was unable to capture it quickly due to its strong defenses, and many soldiers and officers, including Liu himself, began to suffer from illnesses. In summer 927, Emperor Mingzong sent Kong to the Jiangling front to review the matter. Kong sent emissaries to Gao, trying to persuade him to surrender, but Gao refused. With Jiangling's defense holding, Emperor Mingzong was forced to recall Liu's army.

In 927, when Emperor Mingzong was visiting Bian Prefecture, he left Kong in charge of Luoyang. During this time, there was a commoner at Luoyang who violated the ban against private brewing of liquors (which was a state monopoly), and Kong reacted by slaughtering his entire family. Emperor Mingzong viewed this as a gross injustice (although he apparently did not punish Kong for it) and therefore in 928 ended the liquor monopoly.

During these years, Kong and An's alliance continued, but it would soon end. Emperor Mingzong was wanting to take a daughter of An's to be the wife for one of his sons, and Kong stated to An, "You, Lord, has responsibilities that are close to the emperor, and it is inappropriate to enter a marital relationship with an imperial prince." An, believing Kong's good faith in advising so, declined Emperor Mingzong's proposal. Meanwhile, though, Kong was ingratiating himself with Emperor Mingzong's favorite concubine Consort Wang, and as a result, Consort Wang proposed to have Emperor Mingzong's son Li Conghou marry Kong's daughter. Emperor Mingzong agreed, and when An realized that Kong had, in effect, betrayed him, he became very angry. In spring 928, he had Kong made the military governor of Zhongwu Circuit (忠武, headquartered in modern Xuchang, Henan), ejecting him from the imperial government, although Kong continued to carry the honorary chancellor title of Tong Zhongshu Menxia Pingzhangshi (同中書門下平章事) and defender of Luoyang as honorary titles. When Li Chonghou and Kong's daughter married in winter 928, Kong went to Bian Prefecture to attend the ceremony, and Kong tried to get Consort Wang to intercede for him to allow him to stay at the imperial government; An, however, argued vehemently against it, and once the wedding was over, Emperor Mingzong ordered Kong back to Zhongwu.

Kong was subsequently made the military governor of Henghai Circuit (橫海, headquartered in modern Cangzhou, Hebei). He died in 931, while still serving at Henghai. His daughter would later become empress during Li Conghou's brief reign after Emperor Mingzong's death.

== Notes and references ==
- New History of the Five Dynasties, vol. 43.
- Zizhi Tongjian, vols. 265, 273, 274, 275, 276, 277.
