= Li Qi (Five Dynasties) =

Li Qi (Chinese: 李琪; 871 – October 26, 930?), courtesy name Taixiu (台秀), was an official of the Chinese Tang dynasty and its successor states Later Liang and Later Tang of the Five Dynasties and Ten Kingdoms period, serving as a chancellor during Later Liang.

== Background and service during the Tang dynasty ==
Li Qi was born in 871, during the reign of Emperor Yizong of Tang. His ancestors had been Tang dynasty officials for generations, and his fifth-generation ancestor Li Cheng (李憕) was particularly well known for his faithfulness to Tang during the An-Shi Rebellion, during the early stage of which he served as the defender of the eastern capital Luoyang and was killed by An Lushan for refusing to surrender, after An captured the city. Li Qi's father Li Hu (李縠) served as a secretary to Wang Duo, who was the overall commander of Tang forces against the great rebellion led by Huang Chao during the reign of Emperor Yizong's son Emperor Xizong.

When Li Qi was 12, he was already writing poems well enough that he became known to Wang, but Wang had some suspicions whether the child actually wrote the poems himself, or someone else wrote them for him. On one occasion, when Wang invited Li Hu to a meal at his office, he secretly sent a messenger to go test Li Qi, requiring him to write a poem dedicated to the three great subjects who helped Emperor Gao of Han in establishing the Han dynasty (i.e., Xiao He, Han Xin, and Zhang Liang). Li Qi wrote the poem quickly. Wang was greatly shocked by the child's talent and was particularly impressed with the final stanza, and he stated, "This child has great talent. He will dominate the field of literature."

During the subsequent reign of Emperor Xizong's brother Emperor Zhaozong, the official Li Xi and Li Xi's son were both well known for their literary abilities. At that time, Li Qi was 17, and he submitted a scroll of his poems to Li Xi. Li Xi read his poems and was surprised. He welcomed Li Qi into his mansion and stated to him, "I had been disappointed that, in the recent years, when the literati wrote poems, they only wrote several lines without giving their poems titles. You, son, not only wrote beautiful sentences, but wrote just as beautiful titles. I am afraid of you." After this incident, Li Qi became even more well-known. At some point, he passed the imperial examinations in the Jinshi class. (His older brother Li Ting (李珽) also did at some point.) Later, early in Emperor Zhaozong's Tianfu era (901–904), he further passed a special imperial examination for those who were well-learned and capable of writing. He then served as the sheriff of Wugong County (武功, in modern Xianyang, Shaanxi). He later successively served as a surveyor for the director of supplies; Zuo Shiyi (左拾遺), a low-level consultant at the examination bureau of government (門下省, Menxia Sheng); and an imperial censor with the title of Dianzhong Shi Yushi (殿中侍御史). It was said that ever since he began serving as an imperial censor, if he saw an inappropriate policy, he would submit a petition discussing it, and that his writing was so beautiful that the reader would be entranced by it.

== Service during the Later Liang ==
During the subsequent Later Liang, both Li Qi and his older brother Li Ting were well known to Later Liang's founder Emperor Taizu, who made Li Ting Chongzheng Xueshi (崇政學士), a scholar at the office of palace communications. Li Qi was promoted from his Zuo Shiyi position, initially to be the higher rank of Zuo Bujue (左補闕), and then later an imperial scholar (翰林學士, Hanlin Xueshi). He was eventually promoted to be the deputy minister of census (戶部侍郎, Hubu Shilang) and chief imperial scholar (翰林學士承旨). It was said that during Emperor Taizu's numerous campaigns against rival states Qi and Jin, Li Qi often accompanied him and was responsible for issuing orders and edicts. During this time, Li Qi gained the reputation for valuing his promises, discovering talents, rewarding the good, and having harmony in his household.

During the subsequent reign of Emperor Taizu's son Zhu Zhen, Li served successively as the deputy minister of defense (兵部侍郎, Bingbu Shilang), deputy minister of rites (禮部侍郎, Lǐbu Shilang), and deputy minister of civil service affairs (吏部侍郎, Lìbu Shilang, note different tone). He also was put in charge, along with other officials Feng Xijia (馮錫嘉), Zhang Chong (張充), and Chi Yinxiang (郗殷象), of drafting the a chronicle of Emperor Taizu's reign. He was later made deputy chief imperial censor (御史中丞, Yushi Zhongcheng), and then Shangshu You Cheng (尚書右丞), one of the secretaries general at the executive bureau of government (尚書省, Shangshu Sheng).

In 920, Li Qi was made Zhongshu Shilang (中書侍郎), the deputy head of the legislative bureau (中書省, Zhongshu Sheng), and given the designation Tong Zhongshu Menxia Pingzhangshi (同中書門下平章事), making him a chancellor. It was said that he was in alliance with Zhu's close associates Zhao Yan and Zhang Hanjie (張漢傑), and, because of that association, was often accepting bribes. He was also described to be careless, while his chancellor colleague Xiao Qing was described as careful. However, due to Li's talent, Zhu listened to him more than did Xiao. Xiao secretly collected evidence of Li's faults. He was soon able to show Zhu that whenever acting officials bribed Li, Li would make them full officials. Zhu, in anger, wanted to exile Li, but due to Zhao's and Zhang's intercession, Li was only removed from his chancellor post and given the post Taizi Shaobao (太子少保) — an advisor to the Crown Prince, but an honorary post because there was no crown prince at that time.

== Service during the Later Tang ==
=== During Emperor Zhuangzong's reign ===
In 923, Later Tang (i.e., Jin, whose prince Li Cunxu had earlier declared himself emperor (known in historiography as Emperor Zhuangzong), claiming to be the legitimate successor to Tang) captured the Later Liang capital Daliang in a surprise attack; Zhu Zhen committed suicide as the city fell, ending Later Liang, and Later Tang took over Later Liang's territory. It was said that Emperor Zhuangzong had heard of Li Qi's fame before and wanted to give him important offices. In particular, many advisors to Emperor Zhuangzong believed that Guo Chongtao, then the dominating figure at court as Emperor Zhuangzong's chief of staff, was insufficiently well-versed in civilian matters and that he should supplement himself with prior officials with Tang government experience. These advisors tended to recommend Xue Tinggui (薛廷珪) and Li as potential chancellors; however, Guo opposed both, on the grounds that Xue was overly extravagant and Li was too careless. Instead, at Guo's and Doulu Ge's recommendations, Zhao Guangyin and Wei Yue were made chancellors. Li then successively served as minister of worship (太常卿, Taichang Qing) and the minister of civil service affairs (吏部尚書, Lìbu Shangshu).

In 925, due to major flooding at that time, Emperor Zhuangzong was concerned at the lack of food supplies for his armies. He requested opinion from the imperial officials, and Li Qi submitted a petition in which he advocated properly setting a budget before military actions, reducing tax burdens on the farmers to encourage farming, and filling government coffers by having those who are willing to give money to the government be given titles and offices. Emperor Zhuangzong much approved of Li's suggestions, but the suggestions were not actually implemented. Still, Emperor Zhuangzong made him the director of budgeting (國計使, Guojishi) and was said to be considering promoting him to greater office, when Emperor Zhuangzong himself was killed in a mutiny at the Later Tang capital Luoyang.

=== During Emperor Mingzong's reign ===
Emperor Zhuangzong's adoptive brother Li Siyuan, the leader of another major mutiny, soon arrived at Luoyang and took over control of the city, initially with the title of regent. He was preparing to take the throne himself, when a question arose as to what he would be claiming to be the emperor of. His associates Li Shaozhen and Kong Xun, believing that Tang's Mandate of Heaven had ended, advocated that he change the name of the state. Li Siyuan himself, however, felt that his life and career were so connected to Emperor Zhuangzong, his grandfather Li Guochang, and father Li Keyong, such that he could not just become disconnected with them. Li Qi pointed out, if the name of the state was changed, then Li Siyuan would effectively be turning his back on three generation of lords that he served after, and that given his status as an adoptive son, he could take the throne under the Tang name and use the ceremony of an enthroned heir. Li Siyuan agreed, and subsequently took the throne as Emperor Mingzong.

After Emperor Mingzong's taking the throne, his chief of staff An Chonghui became the dominant figure at court. There was an incident where the minor official Ma Yan (馬延) accidentally collided with his train, An had Ma executed on the spot. When Li Qi, who was then apparently serving as the deputy chief imperial censor (御史中丞, Yushi Zhongcheng) reported this to Emperor Mingzong, Emperor Mingzong reacted, at An's request, by issuing an edict blaming the executed-Ma for the incident and declaring that the people should be careful in respecting the senior officials of the state. (It was said that initially, Li was even hesitant to report this incident to Emperor Mingzong at all, and first had the chancellor Ren Huan notify An the reasons why he had to report it, and even then was circumspect in his report.)

By spring 927, after Doulu Ge and Wei Yue were removed from chancellor positions, there were discussions at court as to who would replace them. By this point, An had come to trust Kong greatly, and at Kong's suggestion, An first recommended Zheng Jue, who was made chancellor, and then recommended Cui Xie. Ren, however, favored Li, but because Zheng disliked Li, Kong became against Li, stating to An, "Li Qi is well-versed in literature, but is corrupt. A chancellor should be upright and tolerant, so that he could be a leader to the officials." At a subsequent discussion before Emperor Mingzong, An and Ren got into a heated argument over the merits of Cui and Li. Eventually, Emperor Mingzong commissioned Cui and Feng Dao as chancellors, bypassing Li.

After this dispute, it was said that Li became much suspected by the chancellors, such that they examined his submissions carefully to look for faults. For example, in 929, when Emperor Mingzong was returning to Luoyang from Bian Prefecture (汴州, i.e., Daliang), Li Qi, as the highest-ranked official then at Luoyang, led a group of officials to welcome him. Apparently to praise Emperor Mingzong and the general Wang Yanqiu, who had just defeated the rebellious Wang Du and Wang Du's allied Khitan troops, the military governor (Jiedushi) of Yiwu Circuit (義武, headquartered at Ding Prefecture (定州), in modern Baoding, Hebei), Li, in his submission to Emperor Mingzong, wrote the sentence, "the violent gang of Khitan has been defeated, and the rebellious city of Zhending [(真定)] has fallen," and in doing so confused Zhending — the capital of Yiwu's neighboring circuit Chengde (成德, headquartered in modern Shijiazhuang, Hebei) — with Ding Prefecture. When this was pointed out, Li was punished with having one month of salary withheld from him. Also, when the general Huo Yanwei (i.e., Li Shaozhen, who changed his name from the Emperor Zhuangzong-bestowed imperial clan name back to his birth name) died, Li was put in charge of drafting the tomb monument text. As both Li and Huo served Later Liang, Li described Huo's career during Later Liang as if it were under Later Tang, despite that Later Tang officially viewed Later Liang as an illegitimate regime. The chancellors rebuked him and had Emperor Mingzong issue an order for revision.

It was said that Li Qi, while learned and talented, did not have restraint over his behavior and was overly aggressive in the government despite his actually knowing that doing so was risky, because he lacked an ability to calm himself. He was eventually ordered into retirement with the title of Taizi Taifu (太子太傅) — senior advisor to the Crown Prince, but an entirely honorary position since there was no crown prince at the time. He died in 930, at his mansion at Fushan Block (福善里) in Luoyang. Before his death, he compiled a 10-volume collection of edicts that he had written, and published it with the title of Collection of the Golden Door (金門集), and it was said that the work was popular among the people.

== Sources ==
=== Primary texts ===
- Old History of the Five Dynasties, vol. 58.
- New History of the Five Dynasties, vol. 54.
- Zizhi Tongjian, vols. 271, 272, 274, 275.
