= Cui Xie =

Tang dynasty official

Cui Xie (崔協) (died April 9, 929), courtesy name Sihua (思化), was an official of the Chinese dynasty Tang dynasty, and the subsequent Five Dynasties and Ten Kingdoms period states Later Liang and Later Tang, serving as a chancellor during the reign of Later Tang's second emperor Li Siyuan (Emperor Mingzong).

== Background ==
It is not known when Cui Xie was born. He came from the prominent aristocratic Cui clan of Qinghe, from which many officials came throughout the Tang dynasty. His grandfather Cui Guan (崔瓘) served as the minister of civil service affairs (吏部尚書, Libu Shangshu), while his father Cui Yanrong (崔彥融) served as the prefect of Chu Prefecture (楚州, in modern Huai'an, Jiangsu) — but no higher, having had his career derailed by the more senior official Cui Rao (崔蕘), who exposed him for bribing high-level officials. Through the rest of his life, therefore, Cui Yanrong bore a deep hatred for Cui Rao and indoctrinated his sons to hate Cui Rao as well. Cui Xie himself was known for filial piety in his youth. At some point, he passed the imperial examinations in the Jinshi class, and started his official career as a surveyor for the director of the treasury, as well as the sheriff of Weinan County (渭南, in modern Weinan, Shaanxi), and served as an editor for imperial histories.

== During the Later Liang ==
After Tang ended and was replaced by (in its central part) Later Liang, Cui Xie served in the posts (unclear whether simultaneously, but appeared to be simultaneously) of Zuosi Langzhong (左司郎中, a supervisory official serving under one of the secretaries generals of the Executive Bureau of government (尚書省, Shangshu Sheng)), the magistrate of Wannian County (萬年, one of the two counties making up the Tang capital Chang'an but no longer capital during Later Liang times), and imperial attendant (給事中, Jishizhong). After promotions, he eventually reached the post of deputy minister of defense (兵部侍郎, Bingbu Shilang). However, he once had an encounter with Cui Rao's son Cui Jujian (崔居儉), who was then serving as Zhongshu Sheren (中書舍人), a comparably-leveled official at the legislative bureau (中書省, Zhongshu Sheng). He yelled out to Cui Jujian in a harsh tone, "How dare you see me, the son of Cui Rao?" When Cui Jujian reported this (apparently to the emperor, although it is not known who was the emperor at that time), Cui Xie was demoted to be the head of the Crown Prince's household — a completely honorary position, as there was never a prince who was crowned the Crown Prince during Later Liang. However, shortly after, he was restored to his prior rank, as deputy minister of civil service affairs (吏部侍郎, Libu Shilang).

== During Later Tang ==
Later Liang was in turn conquered by its northern rival Later Tang, and Cui Xie became deputy chief imperial censor (御史中丞, Yushi Zhongcheng) in the new administration of Later Tang's first emperor Li Cunxu. However, in his reports, he would often make grammatical or diction errors, and therefore was often called out and punished for it. He was also said to be impressive in appearance and capable of speech, but having logical lapses in his arguments, such that he gained a reputation for having style without substance.

Early in the subsequent administration of Li Cunxu's adoptive brother and successor Li Siyuan, Cui served successively as the minister of rites (禮部尚書, Libu Shangshu) and then as the minister of worship (太常卿, Taichang Qing). In 927, after Li Siyuan had removed two chancellors left over from Li Cunxu's administration, Doulu Ge and Wei Yue, he was considering who else to commission as chancellors to replace Doulu and Wei. One of his chiefs of staff, Kong Xun, did not like having chancellors from north of the Yellow River — i.e., from the territory of Later Tang's predecessor state, Jin — and thus recommended Cui. The chancellor Ren Huan recommended Li Qi, but fellow chancellor Zheng Jue disliked Li Qi, and therefore persuaded Kong's chief of staff colleague An Chonghui — who was then the most powerful official at Li Siyuan's court and with whom Kong was closely aligned, that Li Qi was corrupt and unsuitable. And therefore recommended Cui as well when they discussed the matter before the emperor. Upon hearing An's recommendation, Ren responded:

An Chonghui does not know the officials at court well, and therefore was deceived. While Cui Xie is from a prominent family, he does not know many words. I am already an unlearned chancellor. How can there be another chancellor like Cui Xie, to draw the laughter from the entire empire?

Li Siyuan himself suggested that the imperial scholar Feng Dao might be suitable, and then ordered these officials to rediscuss the matter. This drew Kong's displeasure about how Ren interfered with his recommendation, and he became even more determined to have Cui made chancellor. When An subsequently discussed the matter with Ren again, Ren compared choosing Cui over Li Qi to choosing beetle dung over fragrant styrax balls. Still, with Kong making daily compliments of Cui and attacks against Li Qi, eventually, Cui and Feng were made chancellors with the designation Tong Zhongshu Menxia Pingzhangshi (同中書門下平章事), and Li Qi was not.

It was said that Cui Xie did not handle many of the important matters of state as chancellor, and that whenever he had to author important documents, he had others write them for him. At that time, it was felt that the imperial university was being neglected, and Li Siyuan therefore had Cui take on the additional responsibility as the principal of the imperial university. He subsequently proposed that 200 students be admitted each year, a proposal that was considered by the popular opinion at the time to be inadequate.

In early 929, Li Siyuan was returning from the eastern capital Daliang to the then-capital Luoyang, with the imperial officials attending him on the trek. While on the way, Cui Xie died at Xushui (須水, in modern Zhengzhou, Henan), due to a stroke. He was given posthumous honors, and the posthumous name Gongjing (恭靖, "respectful and meek").

== Notes and references ==
- History of the Five Dynasties, vol. 58.
- Zizhi Tongjian, vols. 275, 276.
