= Lu Cheng =

Lu Cheng (盧程) was an official of the Chinese Five Dynasties and Ten Kingdoms period Later Tang state (and Later Tang's predecessor state Jin), briefly serving as a chancellor at the time of the founding of Later Tang.

== Background ==
It is not known when or where Lu Cheng was born, although it was said that he was from a prominent aristocratic family. Both his grandfather, Lu Yi (盧懿), and father, Lu Yun (盧蘊), were said to be prominent officials, although their titles were not stated in historical accounts. Lu Cheng himself passed the imperial examinations in the Jinshi class late in the Tianfu era (901-904) of the Emperor Zhaozong of Tang. The chancellor Cui Yin, who was then also the acting director of the salt and iron monopolies, made Lu one of his surveyors.

After the major warlord Zhu Quanzhong the military governor of Xuanwu Circuit (宣武, headquartered in modern Kaifeng, Henan) forced Emperor Zhaozong to move the capital from Chang'an to Luoyang in 904, Zhu's associate, then-chancellor Liu Can, began to carry out persecutions against Tang aristocratic families. Lu thus fled north of the Yellow River, traveling in the regions formerly of Yan and Zhao (i.e., modern Hebei/Beijing). He sometimes donned Taoist monk robes and went to meet regional governors (apparently hoping to be commissioned by them), but was not yet well-known at the time. Because he was friendly with Doulu Ge, who was then serving on the staff for Wang Chuzhi the military governor of Yiwu Circuit (義武, headquartered in modern Baoding, Hebei), and Lu Rubi (盧汝弼), who was then serving on the staff at Hedong Circuit (河東, headquartered in modern Taiyuan, Shanxi) (then ruled by Li Cunxu the Prince of Jin), he first went to visit Doulu, but Wang's treatment of him was not to his satisfaction, so he went to Lu Rubi. Lu Rubi recommended him to Li, who thereafter made him the circuit judicial officer (推官, Tuiguan), and later executive secretary (支使, Zhishi). It was said that Lu Cheng was harsh and lacking in talent, and was prone to argument and arrogance due to his aristocratic background; he was therefore not regarded highly in public opinion.

== During Jin ==
Around the new year 919, Li's assistant Wang Jian (王緘) was killed at a major battle between Jin and its archrival Later Liang. After Li returned to Taiyuan, he held a feast, and publicly named Feng Dao as Wang's successor, despite Feng's reservations that he was not senior enough to succeed Wang — specifically, Lu was more senior than Feng (as was Lu Rubi) and initially expected either himself or Lu Rubi to be named as Wang's successor, such that he privately complained, "The Lord does not take people seriously, such that he put the son of a farmer in high position." On one occasion, when Lu Cheng accompanied Li on a campaign, Li summoned him to the command tent and asked him to draft an order for Li, but he declined, claiming that he was not a talented writer; after that, he was never asked to draft an order again. At that time, the eunuch monitor Zhang Chengye in charge of headquarter matters at Hedong whenever Li was out on campaign. Lu's responsibilities as Zhishi involved overseeing the circuit treasurers, and he did not like this responsibility and asked Zhang to take him off the duty, claiming to be not talented with money matters. Zhang rebuked him: "You, Lord, call yourself a civilian officer. You should be able to use your literary talents to aid the state and the hegemon [(i.e., Li)]. You had once been asked to draft an order, and you claim not to be a good writer. And when it came to the responsibilities of Zhishi, you want to abdicate them. What exactly can you do?" Lu, realizing that his attitude was not appropriate, wept and thanked Zhang for the rebuke. He later was made Li's assistant in Li's role as governor (觀察使, Guanchashi) of Hedong.

== During Later Tang ==
In 923, Li Cunxu was preparing to claim imperial title himself as emperor of a new Later Tang, and he was considering whom to make his chancellors. At that time, his assistant in his role as military governor (Jiedushi) of Hedong, Lu Zhi (盧質), was considered to be the ranking official under him with aristocratic heritage and therefore considered the most appropriate candidate. (By that point, Lu Rubi and a senior former Tang official, Su Xun (蘇循), had died.) Lu Zhi, however, strenuously declined, and instead recommended Doulu Ge and Lu Cheng. Li thus summoned Doulu and Lu Cheng, making them chancellors in his provisional imperial government. Shortly after, he claimed imperial title at Xingtang (興唐, in modern Handan, Hebei), and he formally made Doulu and Lu Cheng chancellors with the designation Tong Zhongshu Menxia Pingzhangshi (同中書門下平章事). Lu Cheng was also made Zhongshu Shilang (中書侍郎), the deputy head of the legislative bureau of government (中書省, Zhongshu Sheng).

As, in claiming imperial title, Li honored his mother Lady Cao as empress dowager and his father Li Keyong's wife Lady Liu consort dowager, he dispatched Lu to Taiyuan to honor them. On the way, it was said that Lu was arrogant, while riding the litter there at the cost of much manual labor, and if the local officials displeased him, he freely whipped and humiliated them. He also spoke insultingly of Emperor Gao of Han and Confucius.

Later in the year, there was a time when Lu made a personal request to the administrators at Xingtang's municipal government, and the request was not handled to his satisfaction, such that he whipped their backs. Ren Tuan (任團), the deputy mayor of Xingtang and the minister of palace supplies, who was the husband to Li's cousin, went to visit Lu to protest the behavior, and Lu insulted him, stating, "You, Lord, are nothing but an insect. How dare you try to depend on the power of your wife?" Ren reported this incident to Li, who angrily stated, "We mistakenly made this idiot a chancellor; how dare he insult our minister?" He wanted to order Lu Cheng to commit suicide, but at much effort by Lu Zhi to intercede, Lu Cheng was demoted to be a member of the staff of the Crown Prince — a completely honorary position as there was no crown prince at the time — and not ordered to die.

Later in the year, Li conquered Later Liang and moved his capital to Luoyang. Lu, along with the other imperial officials, accompanied him to Luoyang, and fell off a horse on the way. He subsequently suffered a stroke as a result and died. He was given posthumous honors.

== Notes and references ==
- History of the Five Dynasties, vol. 67.
- New History of the Five Dynasties, vol. 28.
- Zizhi Tongjian, vols. vol. 272.
