= Empress Kong =

Empress Kong (孔皇后, personal name unknown) (died 934), formally Empress Ai (哀皇后, "the lamentable empress"), was an empress of the Chinese Five Dynasties and Ten Kingdoms Period state Later Tang. Her husband was its third emperor Li Conghou (Emperor Min).

== Background ==
It is not known when the future Empress Kong was born. Her father was Kong Xun, who had served as an official of Later Tang's predecessor (and rival) Later Liang prior to serving Later Tang.

By 928, Kong Xun was serving as a chief of staff for Later Tang's second emperor Li Siyuan, and he was a close associate of fellow chief of staff An Chonghui, who was then the most powerful figure at court. At one point, Li Siyuan had wanted to take An's daughter as wife for one of his sons. Kong dissuaded An, arguing that given how honored and how close to the emperor he was, it was inappropriate to further create a marital relationship, so An declined. However, thereafter, there were those who told An that Kong was good at alienating people. When Kong heard this, apparently wanting to create a relationship with the imperial household independent of his relationship with An, he ingratiated Li Siyuan's favorite concubine Consort Wang and sought that his daughter be married to an imperial prince. Consort Wang thus suggested to Li Siyuan that Kong's daughter be married to his son Li Conghou. Li Siyuan agreed. When An heard this, he became incensed, and he had Kong ejected from the court (then at Daliang) to serve as the defender of Luoyang. However, this did not stop the marriage, and the wedding took place around the new year 929. It was because of the wedding's taking place that Kong was able to go to Daliang to attend the wedding. Once at Daliang, he again tried to ingratiate Consort Wang and her associates, hoping to stay at Daliang. Due to An's stern opposition, however, he was returned to Luoyang.

Princess Kong was said to be wise in her actions, and she bore four sons for Li Conghou.

== As empress ==
Li Siyuan died in late 933, and Li Conghou became emperor. According to the New History of the Five Dynasties, he created Princess Kong empress, but a formal creation ceremony was not held at that time.

At that time, the court scene was controlled by Li Conghou's chiefs of staff Zhu Hongzhao and Feng Yun. They suspected the powers held by Li Conghou's older adoptive brother Li Congke the military governor (jiedushi) of Fengxiang Circuit (鳳翔, headquartered in modern Baoji, Shaanxi) and brother-in-law Shi Jingtang the military governor of Hedong Circuit (河東, headquartered in modern Taiyuan, Shanxi). Li Congke's oldest son Li Chongji (李重吉) was then a commander of the imperial guards, and they did not want him to hold such a command. They therefore sent him out of the capital to serve as military prefect of Bo Prefecture (亳州, in modern Bozhou, Anhui). In addition, they forced Li Congke's daughter Li Huiming (李惠明), who had become a Buddhist nun at then-capital Luoyang, to live in the palace, believing that this would give them greater control on her father. As a result, Li Congke became fearful.

In spring 934, not wanting Shi to remain at Hedong for long, Zhu and Feng transferred Shi, Li Congke, and Fan Yanguang the military governor of Chengde Circuit (成德, headquartered in modern Shijiazhuang, Hebei) to new assignments. Believing that this was intended to target him, Li Congke rebelled. During his rebellion, Li Chongji and Li Huiming were executed. Li Congke's rebellion was successful, and he quickly reached Luoyang's vicinity. Li Conghou fled, hoping to gain Shi's support, but was soon put under effective house arrest by Shi, who pledged allegiance to Li Congke. At that time, Empress Kong was ill, and her children were young, and therefore none of them was able to accompany him. Li Congke thereafter took the throne, and had Li Conghou killed. After that, Li Congke sent a messenger to Empress Kong, stating, "Now, where is Li Chongji?" He then put her and her sons to death. After Shi subsequently overthrew Li Congke with assistance of Liao dynasty in 936 and established his own Later Jin, he posthumously gave Empress Kong her posthumous name of Ai ("lamentable").

== Notes and references ==
- History of the Five Dynasties, vol. 49.
- New History of the Five Dynasties, vol. 15.
- Zizhi Tongjian, vols. 278, 279.

| Preceded by Empress Cao | Empress of Later Tang; 933?–934 | Succeeded by Empress Liu |
