= Xiao Qing =

Chinese politician

Xiao Qing (蕭頃; 862 – 19 June 930?), courtesy name Zicheng (子澄), was an official of the Chinese Tang dynasty and its successor states Later Liang and Later Tang of the Five Dynasties and Ten Kingdoms period, serving as a chancellor during Later Liang.

== Background ==
Xiao Qing was born in 862, during the reign of Emperor Yizong of Tang. His family was from Wannian (萬年), one of the two counties making up the Tang dynasty capital Chang'an. His line was a prominent one—having produced a number of chancellors and other important officials, including his grandfather Xiao Fang, who served as a chancellor during the reign of Emperor Xizong of Tang. His father Xiao Lin (蕭廩) served as the mayor of Jingzhao Municipality (京兆, i.e., the Chang'an area). Xiao Qing himself was said to be intelligent and capable in literary matters.

== Service during the Tang dynasty ==
During the reign of Emperor Yizong's son Emperor Zhaozong, Xiao Qing passed the imperial examinations in the Jinshi class, and subsequently entered governmental service. He served successively as a surveyor for the treasury (度支巡官, Duzhi Xunguan); scholar at the ministry of ceremonies (太常博士, Taichang Boshi); and low-level consultant (右補闕, You Bujue) at the legislative bureau of government (中書省, Zhongshu Sheng). While serving as You Bujue, there were times when a number of warlords requested that they be allowed to build temples dedicated to their ancestors. Xiao submitted a petition to Emperor Zhaozong, discussing why such requests were inappropriate, so those requests were rejected.

Later, while Xiao was serving as Libu Yuanwailang (吏部員外郎), a low-level official at the ministry of civil service affairs (吏部, Libu), there was a time when the former chancellor Zhang Jun, was serving as one of the Puye (僕射, the heads of the executive bureau (尚書省, Shangshu Sheng), which the ministry of civil service belonged to). At that time, Zhang's ally, the major warlord Zhu Quanzhong the military governor of Xuanwu Circuit (宣武, headquartered in modern Kaifeng, Henan), had sent his attendant Gao Shao (高邵) to demand that one of his (Zhu's) sons be given an official post based on Zhu's own prominence. The agencies responsible for such commissions rejected the request, finding it to be without precedent. Zhang, however, to please Zhu, insisted on the commission's approval, and went to the agencies himself to demand so. Xiao wrote (apparently to Zhang, but may be to Emperor Zhaozong): "It is not the customs of the southern palace [(i.e., the part of the governmental complex where the imperial officials worked)] that a Puye, without gathering his subordinate officials to consult with them, personally go to the agencies to issue orders." When Zhang became aware of what Xiao wrote, he apologized profusely. Xiao thus became well known after that, and this also impressed Zhu.

== Service during Later Liang ==
After Zhu Quanzhong later seized the throne and established his own Later Liang as its Emperor Taizu, Xiao Qing became a Later Liang official, and successively served as imperial attendant (給事中, Jishizhong), mid-level consultant (諫議大夫, Jianyi Daifu), deputy chief imperial censor (御史大夫, Yushi Daifu), and deputy minister of rites (禮部侍郎, Lǐbu Shilang). In that office, he was responsible for imperial examinations, and became known for his abilities.

In 918, by which time Emperor Taizu's son Zhu Zhen was emperor, Xiao was serving as the deputy minister of civil service affairs (吏部侍郎, Lìbu Shilang, note different tone), when he was made the deputy head of the legislative bureau (中書侍郎, Zhongshu Shilang) and given the designation Tong Zhongshu Menxia Pingzhangshi (同中書門下平章事), making him a chancellor.

In 920, Li Qi was also made a chancellor due to his association with Zhu Zhen's close associates Zhao Yan and Zhang Hanjie (張漢傑), and soon Xiao and Li were in conflict with each other. It was said that while Xiao did not display displeasure, he secretly sought out evidence of Li's faults. Li, who was careless and willing to accept bribes, was often making acting officials who bribed him full officials. Xiao reported this to the emperor. Zhu Zhen, in anger, wanted to exile Li, but Zhao and Zhang interceded for Li for him to avoid that fate, although he was removed from chancellorship.

== Service during Later Tang ==
In 923, Emperor Zhuangzong of Later Liang's archrival Later Tang, which claimed to be Tang's legitimate successor, captured the Later Liang capital Daliang in a surprise attack. Zhu Zhen committed suicide as the city fell, ending Later Liang, and Later Tang took over Later Liang's territory. Emperor Zhuangzong, believing that Xiao Qing and a number of other high-level Later Liang officials, including Xiao's chancellor colleague Zheng Jue, whose ancestors had been Tang officials for generations, were disloyal to Tang and should be punished, and therefore exiled them—in Xiao's case, he was exiled to be the census officer of Deng Prefecture (登州, in modern Yantai, Shandong). He was later slightly promoted to be the military advisor to the prefect of Pu Prefecture (濮州, in modern Puyang, Henan), and yet later recalled to then-Later Tang capital Luoyang to serve as Taizi Binke (太子賓客)—an honorary post as the Crown Prince's advisor (as there was no crown prince at that time).

Early in the Tiancheng era (926–930) of Emperor Zhuangzong's adoptive brother and successor Emperor Mingzong, Xiao successively served as the minister of rites (禮部尚書, Libu Shangshu), then as the minister of ceremonies (太常卿, Taichang Qing), and retired as Taizi Shaobao (太子少保, also an advisor to the Crown Prince, but also honorary as there was no crown prince at the time). He died at the age of 68.

== Notes and references ==
- Old History of the Five Dynasties, vol. 58.
- Zizhi Tongjian, vols. 270, 271, 272.
