= Zhao Feng =

Zhao Feng (Chinese: 趙鳳; pinyin: Zhào Fèng; died 935) was a Chinese military general and politician of the Chinese Five Dynasties and Ten Kingdoms period state Later Tang, serving as a chancellor during the reign of Emperor Mingzong.

== Background and life prior to Later Tang's establishment ==
Zhao Feng was probably born during the reign of Emperor Xizong of Tang in the late 870s or early 880s, as he would describe himself as either 49 or in his 50s in 934 shortly before his death, but the exact year is not known. It is known, however, that he was from You Prefecture (幽州, in modern Beijing). In his youth, he became a Confucian scholar. As he was later referred to as a Jinshi (進士), he probably also passed the imperial examinations during Tang.

The region eventually came under control of the warlord Liu Shouguang the military governor of Lulong Circuit (盧龍, headquartered at You Prefecture), and sometime after Liu became a nominal vassal of Tang's successor state Later Liang (the first of the five dynasties that controlled the Central Plains and north China during the Five Dynasties and Ten Kingdoms period) and received the title of Prince of Yan, Liu decided to conscript as many men into his army as possible and tattoo their faces. Many scholars were fearful of this fate and became Buddhist monks to avoid this. Zhao was one of those who took tonsure to avoid this fate, although he subsequently fled to Yan's neighboring state Jin, and came to serve on staff of Liu Shouguang's brother Liu Shouqi (劉守奇), who had also fled to Jin to avoid his brother's rule.

In 912, when Jin's prince Li Cunxu launched a major attack on Yan (which Liu Shouguang had proclaimed a separate empire by that point with himself being emperor), commanded by his major general Zhou Dewei, Liu Shouqi accompanied Zhou on the campaign. When Zhou put Yan's Zhuo Prefecture (涿州, in modern Baoding, Hebei) under siege, the prefect Liu Zhiwen (劉知溫) initially defended the city against the siege, but when Liu Shouqi appeared at the city walls to persuade him to surrender, he did. Zhou, however, was jealous of Liu Shouqi's easily being able to persuade Liu Zhiwen to surrender, and made a false accusation against Liu Shouqi to Li. When Li subsequently summoned Liu Shouqi to his presence, Liu Shouqi, not sure what Li would do, fled with Zhao and another staff member, Liu Qufei (劉去非), to Later Liang. Later Liang's Emperor Taizu commissioned Liu Shouqi as the prefect of Bo Prefecture (博州, in modern Liaocheng, Shandong), and Zhao accompanied Liu Shouqi to Bo Prefecture to serve as his secretary. It was not stated in historical accounts whether Zhao also accompanied Liu Shouqi to Shunhua Circuit (順化, headquartered in modern Cangzhou, Hebei) when Later Liang took it from Yan in 913 and made Liu Shouqi its military governor (Jiedushi), but it was said that after Liu Shouqi's subsequent death, Zhao became the secretary to the military governor of Tianping Circuit (天平, headquartered in modern Tai'an, Shandong).

== During Later Tang ==
=== During Emperor Zhuangzong's reign ===
In 923, Li Cunxu declared himself emperor of a new Later Tang (as Emperor Zhuangzong), claiming to be the legitimate successor to Tang. Soon thereafter, in a surprise attack across the Yellow River commanded by Emperor Zhuangzong's adoptive brother Li Siyuan, Later Tang forces captured Tianping's capital Yun Prefecture (鄆州). Li Siyuan took Zhao Feng and the deputy military commander Cui Dang (崔簹) captive and delivered them to Emperor Zhuangzong's then-location, Xingtang (興唐, in modern Handan, Hebei). Emperor Zhuangzong, who had been impressed with Zhao's reputation previously, made him an imperial scholar with the title of Huluan Xueshi (扈鑾學士). After he completed the conquest of Later Liang later in the year, he gave Zhao the more formal imperial scholar title of Hanlin Xueshi (翰林學士) and also made him Zhongshu Sheren (中書舍人), a mid-level official at the legislative bureau of government (中書省, Zhongshu Sheng).

During Emperor Zhuangzong's reign, Zhao became known for his frank advice to Emperor Zhuangzong — which the emperor appreciated but rarely accepted. For example, in 924, when Emperor Zhuangzong's wife Empress Liu wanted to make the very wealthy ex-Later Liang official Zhang Quanyi her godfather, apparently because he offered her many gifts, Empress Liu asked Zhao to draft a letter thanking Zhang. Zhao, instead, submitted a secret petition to Emperor Zhuangzong, stating, "Ever since ancient times, there was no occasion when the mother of the territory under the heavens called a subject her father." Emperor Zhuangzong praised Zhao for his frankness, but still allowed Empress Liu and Zhang to enter into this relationship. On another occasion, when Zhang's adoptive son Hao Jisun (郝繼孫) was sentenced to death for a crime, Emperor Zhuangzong's close associates, including eunuchs and performers, wanted to confiscate Hao's considerable wealth. Zhao submitted another petition, pointing out that as an adoptive son to Zhang, Hao should not have had his separate wealth, and that confiscating the wealth that Hao maintained would give an impression that sentencing him to death was for the purpose of taking that wealth. It appeared that Emperor Zhuangzong also did not accept this advice.

=== During Emperor Mingzong's reign ===
In 926, Emperor Zhuangzong was killed in a mutiny at the capital Luoyang that spawned from a series of mutinies after the major general Guo Chongtao had been killed on the orders of Empress Liu. Li Siyuan, who had led one of the mutinies, then arrived at Luoyang and, after initially claiming the title of regent, later took the throne (as Emperor Mingzong). As Emperor Mingzong was illiterate, and his chief of staff (Shumishi) An Chonghui, while literate, was not well-versed in the literatures and history, Emperor Mingzong was having difficulty reacting to the petitions that came to him, as emperor. At An's suggestion, Emperor Mingzong thus established two high posts for imperial scholars at Duanming Palace (端明殿), and commissioned Zhao Feng and Feng Dao to serve in those posts.

Zhao, while recommended by An, was also friendly with the chancellor Ren Huan, whom, however, An viewed as a political enemy, and who was removed from his chancellor post in 927, apparently under An's instigation. Later in the year, however, An, believing that Ren might join the general Zhu Shouyin in rebellion, persuaded Emperor Mingzong to order Ren to commit suicide. Despite An's power, Zhao, weeping, nevertheless stated to him, "Ren Huan is a righteous man; how would he consider rebelling? You, Lord, are so excessive in your punishments, and how can you govern the state like this?" It was said that An was shamed by Zhao's speech, but the speech apparently had no effect, as Ren's death was subsequently carried out.

Prior to Emperor Mingzong's becoming emperor, a fortuneteller named Zhou Xuanbao (周玄豹) had stated to him that his appearance showed honor beyond measure. After Emperor Mingzong became emperor, he wanted to summon Zhou to his presence. Zhao recommended against this, stating:

Zhou Xuanbao stated that Your Imperial Majesty would become the Son of Heaven. While those words have come true, what other prediction can he make to Your Imperial Majesty? If you invite him to the capital, people who are frivolous and treacherous will surely crowd his house, asking him for predictions. Ever since ancient times, these fortunetellers' frivolous words have led to many people to have their families slaughtered. This is not the way to protect the state.

After Zhao's advice, Emperor Mingzong only gave Zhou an honorary commission and awards in gold and silk, and did not summon him.

In 927, Emperor Mingzong had briefly moved his court from Luoyang to the eastern capital Kaifeng. (It was Emperor Mingzong's announcement of this movement that led to Zhu's rebellion, as Zhu, who was then Kaifeng's defender, believed that the move was targeting him.) In 928, Emperor Mingzong considered going from there to Yedu (鄴都, i.e., the same city as Xingtang). The imperial guard soldiers were displeased that they had just had to move their families from Luoyang to Kaifeng and now faced a prospect of further moving them from Kaifeng to Yedu. Further, the warlord Wang Du the military governor of Yiwu Circuit (義武, headquartered in modern Baoding) also believed that the move was targeting him, and therefore prepared to resist. Despite this, most officials did not dare to oppose Emperor Mingzong's move. Zhao reported these issues to An and, in frank words, and An agreed; after An reported Zhao's advice to Emperor Mingzong, Emperor Mingzong stopped the planned movement to Yedu.

On another occasion, when a Buddhist monk who had visited the Western Regions (Xiyu) regions offered to the emperor a relic that the monk claimed to be a tooth from a Buddha, Emperor Mingzong awarded the monk many gifts. Zhao pointed out that under Buddhist tradition, the Buddha's tooth should be indestructible, and asked to test it. He took an axe to it, and it crumbled easily. Emperor Mingzong thereafter stopped the awards to the monk.

In 929, Emperor Mingzong made Zhao Menxia Shilang (門下侍郎, deputy head of the examination bureau (門下省, Menxia Sheng)) and a chancellor, with the designation Tong Zhongshu Menxia Pingzhangshi (同中書門下平章事). This brought displeasure from Zhao's fellow imperial scholar Yu Qiao (于嶠), who had been previously friendly with Zhao but who believed himself to be more capable than Zhao. Yu and another official, Xiao Xifu (蕭希甫), thereafter submitted a number of petitions that attacked the governance at the time but particularly targeting Zhao. Zhao became resentful of them, but did not initially react. Meanwhile, Yu also offended An based on a dispute that Yu had with one of his neighbors over a watermill, and at An's instruction, Zhao had Yu demoted to the less prestigious position of Mishu Shaojian (秘書少監), the deputy head of the Palace Library. Yu wanted to discuss with Zhao about this, and so took wine to Zhao's house, intending to drink with Zhao and talk. Zhao knew what Yu wanted to see him for and therefore had his servant refuse the meeting for him, claiming that he was bathing. In anger, Yu urinated on the entryway of Zhao's servant's booth and cursed the servant. The servant instead claimed to Zhao that Yu cursed Zhao and urinated on Zhao's mansion door. Zhao reported this to Emperor Mingzong, who reacted by stripping Yu of his offices and exiling him, first to Wu Prefecture (武州, in modern Zhangjiakou, Hebei), then to Zhenwu (振武, headquartered in modern Shuozhou, Shanxi). It was said that the people lamented this punishment as overly harsh.

In 930, An, who had past grudges against Emperor Mingzong's adoptive son Li Congke, encouraged Li Congke's subordinate Yang Yanwen (楊彥溫) to mutiny, to try to inculpate Li Congke. Li Congke was forced to flee to Luoyang. After Yang's mutiny was put down, An tried to have Feng and Zhao suggest to Emperor Mingzong that Li Congke should be punished for his lack of control over the army, but Emperor Mingzong rebuffed them, only having Li Congke return to his mansion. Subsequently, the officers Li Xingde (李行德) and Zhang Jian (張儉) encouraged one Bian Yanwen (邊彥溫) into falsely accusing An of plotting a rebellion. Emperor Mingzong, disbelieving the accusation, immediately had Bian put to death, and later, at Zhao's suggestion, also had Li Xingde and Zhang, as well as their families, put to death. Still, An was under much attack for holding onto power too long, such that Emperor Mingzong considered replacing him and such that An himself offered to resign. Feng believed that what was best for An was for him to be relieved of his position as Shumishi. Zhao disagreed and argued to Emperor Mingzong that An, as his chief advisor, should not be easily removed. Emperor Mingzong agreed (at that time) and left An in his post as Shumishi.

In 931, with the Later Tang forces commanded by Emperor Mingzong's son-in-law Shi Jingtang having no success against two rebel generals, Meng Zhixiang the military governor of Xichuan Circuit (西川, headquartered in modern Chengdu, Sichuan) and Dong Zhang the military governor of Dongchuan Circuit (東川, headquartered in modern Mianyang, Sichuan) — whose rebellions were considered to be caused by An's suspicions against them — An offered to head to the front to oversee the campaign himself. However, as soon as he left the capital, the general Zhu Hongzhao the military governor of Fengxiang Circuit (鳳翔, headquartered in modern Baoji, Shaanxi) accused An of plotting to take over Shi's army. Emperor Mingzong thereafter summoned An back to Luoyang, but even before An could reach there, instead commissioned him to be the military governor of Huguo Circuit (護國, headquartered in modern Yuncheng, Shanxi), a fairly surprising demotion for someone of such high power. With An's safety considered precarious at that point, Zhao wanted to try to save An and so stated to Emperor Mingzong:

An Chonghui is Your Imperial Majesty's house servant. He will surely not rebel, but because his actions were careless, he opened himself to accusations. If Your Imperial Majesty does not carefully examine his heart, he will soon be dead.

Emperor Mingzong came to believe that Zhao was in league with An, and therefore became very displeased. After An was subsequently ordered to retire, and then killed, Emperor Mingzong also sent Zhao out of the capital, to serve as the military governor of Anguo Circuit (安國, headquartered in modern Xingtai, Hebei), still carrying the Tong Zhongshu Menxia Pingzhangshi title as an honorary chancellor title. It was said that while at Anguo, Zhao distributed his salaries to the officers, staff members, and guests, and did not keep wealth for himself.

=== After Emperor Mingzong's reign ===
Emperor Mingzong died in 933 and was succeeded by his biological son Li Conghou the Prince of Song (as Emperor Min). In 934, Emperor Min's leading advisors Zhu Hongzhao and Feng Yun, not wanting Shi Jingtang (who was then the military governor of Hedong Circuit (河東, headquartered in modern Taiyuan, Shanxi)) and Li Congke (who was then the military governor of Fengxiang) to be entrenched, tried to move them both. Li Congke, believing that they had unfriendly intentions toward him, rebelled, and quickly advanced on Luoyang, forcing Emperor Min to flee to Wei Prefecture (衛州, in modern Xinxiang, Henan). When Zhao heard this, he initially wanted to take his soldiers and staff and immediately head to Wei Prefecture to attend to Emperor Min — despite the dangers such an action might have — and the soldiers were initially willing to follow him. He never carried out the journey, however, before news came that Emperor Min had been killed by emissaries sent by Li Congke.

Li Congke subsequently took the throne. He summoned Zhao back to Luoyang to serve in the honorary post of Taizi Taibao (太子太保). However, due to a foot ailment, Zhao was unable to attend imperial meetings. When the illness became greater, Zhao tried to discern his own fortune using the I Ching, but as soon as he was about to discern the results, he tossed them aside, stating, "Our family has never had someone who reached the age of 49, and was for generations poor and unhonored. I have already reached that age, and had been both general and chancellor. Why do I want more years?" He died in 935.

== Notes and references ==
- History of the Five Dynasties, vol. 67.
- New History of the Five Dynasties, vol. 28.
- Zizhi Tongjian, vols. 268, 272, 273, 275, 276, 277, 278, 279.
