= Kong Qian =

Chinese politician (died 926)

Kong Qian (Chinese: 孔謙) (died 28 May 926) was a Chinese economist and politician of the Five Dynasties and Ten Kingdoms period state Later Tang and Later Tang's predecessor state Jin. He was credited with making sure that the campaigns of Later Tang's founding emperor Emperor Zhuangzong (Li Cunxu) were well-financed, but his methods of extracting funds from the people were also said to be so exacting that the people eventually became resentful of Emperor Zhuangzong, helping to lead to Emperor Zhuangzong's downfall.

== Background ==
It is not known when Kong Qian was born, but it is known that he was from Wei Prefecture (魏州, in modern Handan, Hebei). At some point prior to the surrender of Tianxiong Circuit (天雄, headquartered at Wei Prefecture) to Jin in 915 — i.e., at a time when Tianxiong belonged to Jin's archrival Later Liang — Kong became the accounting officer at Wei Prefecture. He thus became a Jin subject when Tianxiong became a Jin possession then. He was said to be diligent and good at managing the books.

== During Jin ==
After Tianxiong became Jin possession, Jin's prince Li Cunxu personally assumed the title of military governor (Jiedushi) of Tianxiong. Apparently impressed with Kong Qian's abilities, Li made him the officer in charge of the treasury. It was said that Kong flattered the prince and carefully cultivated relationships with powerful individuals, such that he became increasingly powerful. For the next eight years (until 923, when Later Liang fell), as the Jin and Later Liang forces battled on the Yellow River border, it was said that despite Tianxiong's war-ravaged status, Kong made sure that the Jin army never lacked money or food, but as a result of his high taxations and other means of wresting wealth from the people, the people of Tianxiong came to bear a heavy resentment for the prince.

== During Later Tang ==
In 923, Li Cunxu declared himself the emperor of a new Later Tang (as Emperor Zhuangzong) at Wei Prefecture (which he renamed Xingtang Municipality (興唐)). As part of the orders commissioning various officers to imperial offices, he was considering whom to name as the director of material pricing (租庸使, Zuyongshi) — i.e., the official in charge of the key functions of taxation, treasury, and salt and iron monopolies. Kong Qian considered himself capable and suitable for the position, but the popular sentiment among the officials at the time was that Kong was of too lowly birth and had insufficient previous accomplishments to serve in such a post, so Emperor Zhuangzong's chief of staff Guo Chongtao recommended the senior officer Zhang Xian (張憲) to serve in that office, with Kong serving as his deputy. This displeased Kong.

Later in the year, Emperor Zhuangzong, in a surprise attack, captured the Later Liang capital Daliang. The Later Liang emperor Zhu Zhen committed suicide, ending Later Liang and allowing Later Tang to take control of Later Liang territory, and Emperor Zhuangzong subsequently made Luoyang his capital, designating Xingtang as the eastern capital. Shortly after, Kong, wanting to get Zhang out of the role of supervising him, went to see Guo, and suggested that Zhang would be suitable for the important role of defender of Xingtang, by emphasizing Xingtang's importance and that Zhang was the only suitable person for that position. Guo agreed and recommended Zhang to be Xingtang's defender. However, instead of becoming director of material pricing as Kong expected, Kong remained deputy, with the chancellor Doulu Ge assuming the director of material pricing office as an additional office, again disappointing Kong.

In 924, Kong argued to Guo that because Doulu's position as chancellor already required him to carry out many duties, his work as the director of material pricing was getting backlogged. He further showed Guo a note that suggested that Doulu was misappropriating treasury funds. When Guo brought this matter with Doulu, Doulu became fearful and offered the office to Guo. Guo declined. When Emperor Zhuangzong asked Guo for an alternative recommendation, Guo again recommended Zhang, and Emperor Zhuangzong thus initially issued an order summoning Zhang from Xingtang to serve as director of material pricing. This displeased Kong, and Zhang's morally upright nature was also causing concern among other officials. Kong thus went to Doulu with an alternative idea:

The tedious matters involving money and grains can be simply handled by a hardworking administrator. The Wei capital is an important home base, and how can it be disregarded? The mayor of Xingtang, Wang Zhengyan [(王正言), who would be in line to become the defender of Xingtang if Zhang were recalled)] is morally upright, but is not sufficiently intelligent. If you are to give him an important responsibility, you should let him be here at the imperial court so that others can assist him; that is better than letting him have executive authority.

Doulu mentioned this idea to Guo, and Guo subsequently suggested to Emperor Zhuangzong to leave Zhang at Xingtang. Instead, Wang was made the director of imperial pricing, again with Kong as his deputy. This was a situation Kong preferred, as he saw Wang as weak and apprehensive and therefore someone that he could control.

Meanwhile, Kong was concentrating his efforts on gathering tax revenue so that he could use the revenues to make the emperor and other powerful individuals happy. Indeed, it was said that whatever taxes Emperor Zhuangzong might have ordered exempted in his edicts, Kong disregarded the exemptions and collected the taxes anyway, such that the emperor's edicts lost credibility. Further, when the people, as they were allowed to, submitted silk in lieu of money for taxes, Kong would have the silk assessed at lower value than it actually was, thus causing the people more grief.

By fall 924, Kong was displeased that he was still just deputy director of material pricing, and therefore often criticized Wang before Guo. He further bribed Emperor Zhuangzong's favorite performers and eunuchs, hoping that they would help intercede with the emperor for him. However, he was not successful at that time at replacing Wang. In anger, he offered to resign, and Emperor Zhuangzong, believing that he was trying to dodge responsibility, was so angry that he considered arresting Kong, only relenting when one of his favorite performers, Jing Jin (景進), interceded on Kong's behalf. When Wang suffered a stroke later in the year, Kong was finally made director of material pricing, with the former Later Liang official Kong Xun serving as his deputy. As described in the Zizhi Tongjian:

From this point on, Kong Qian was able to follow his wishes. He collected heavy taxes and did so swiftly, to supply for the expenditures of the emperor. The people suffered greatly.

Meanwhile, by 925, the central part of the Later Tang realm, including Xingtang, was suffering from a major famine. The elite Yinqiang corps from Xingtang, who served as Emperor Zhuangzong's personal guard corps, were already resentful because Emperor Zhuangzong had not delivered on the promise that they would be heavily rewarded with wealth after he destroyed Later Liang. In this famine, their family members, who remained at Xingtang, suffered greatly, and many starved, despite Kong Qian's efforts to have food delivered to Xingtang and distributed to the soldiers' families, leading to many soldiers resenting him. By spring 926, particularly after Emperor Zhuangzong executed Guo and another major general, Zhu Youqian, without good cause, the Later Tang realm became overrun with mutinies. In summer 926, Emperor Zhuangzong was killed in battle at Luoyang in one of those mutinies, and one of the rebel leaders, Emperor Zhuangzong's adoptive brother Li Siyuan, quickly arrived at Luoyang and assumed (for that time) the title of regent. (He would later take the throne as Emperor Mingzong.) Believing that Kong was responsible for causing suffering for both soldiers and civilians, he ordered Kong be executed, and ended the regulations that Kong promulgated that he considered overly harsh. He also abolished the office of director of material pricing, redivided the directorate's responsibilities among three agencies in charge of taxation, treasury, and monopolies (i.e., to the state it was before Later Liang consolidated those responsibilities into a single office), and returned to the chancellors.

== Notes and references ==
- History of the Five Dynasties, vol. 73.
- New History of the Five Dynasties, vol. 26.
- Zizhi Tongjian, vols. 269, 272, 273, 274, 275.
