= Ren Huan =

Ren Huan (Chinese: 任圜; died 927) was a Chinese military general and politician of the Chinese Five Dynasties and Ten Kingdoms period state Later Tang (and Later Tang's predecessor state Jin). He served as a chancellor during the reign of Later Tang's second emperor Li Siyuan, but became embroiled in a power struggle with Li Siyuan's powerful chief of staff An Chonghui. He eventually was forced into retirement, but An eventually had Li Siyuan order him to commit suicide.

== Background ==
It is not known when Ren Huan was born, but it was known that his family was originally from Sanyuan (三原, in modern Xianyang, Shaanxi). His grandfather Ren Qing (任清) served as a deputy mayor of Chengdu. His father Ren Maohong (任茂宏), in order to avoid late-Tang dynasty wars that engulfed the region, fled to Taiyuan, then under the rule of the major warlord Li Keyong the military governor (jiedushi) of Hedong Circuit (河東, headquartered in modern Taiyuan). Li Keyong recommended him as the magistrate of Xihe County (西河, in modern Linfen, Shanxi).

Ren Maohong had five sons—Ren Tu (任圖), Ren Hui (任回), Ren Huan, Ren Tuan (任團), and Ren Jiong (任冏). All five were said to remarkable in appearance and behavior, impressing Li. He gave a daughter of a clansman in marriage to Ren Tuan. While Li Keyong's adoptive nephew Li Sizhao served under Li Keyong in the Hedong army, he became friendly with Ren Huan. Thus, when Li Keyong put him in charge of Zhaoyi Circuit (昭義, headquartered in modern Changzhi, Shanxi), at his request, Ren Huan was made his executive secretary in his role as governor (觀察使, Guanchashi).

== During Jin ==
It was said that Ren Huan was handsome in appearance and capable in speaking. There had been an occasion when false accusations were laid against Li Sizhao to Li Keyong's son and successor Li Cunxu (who then ruled the domain as the Prince of Jin after Tang's fall). Whenever Ren served as emissary from Li Sizhao to Li Cunxu's court, he would explain on Li Sizhao's behalf, to keep the communications open and friendly. When Ren's mother died, Li Cunxu, in the name of the emperor of the fallen Tang, recalled him to governmental service, serving as Li Sizhao's judicial officer in his role as governor of Zhaoyi.

In 922, during Li Cunxu's campaign against Zhang Chujin, whose father Zhang Wenli had assassinated Li Cunxu's ally Wang Rong the Prince of Zhao and taken over Zhao lands, Li Sizhao was killed in battle. Under orders that Li Sizhao left before he died, the command of the Zhaoyi soldiers then with Li Cunxu's army was given to Ren, and Ren kept the command structure and pass codes in place, such that during the continued siege of Zhao's capital Zhen Prefecture (鎮州, in modern Shijiazhuang, Hebei), the Zhen rebels were unaware of Li Sizhao's death for some time. Li Cunxu awarded Ren greatly for this appropriate handling of the situation. Ren subsequently served under the subsequent Jin commanders of the operations, Li Cunjin and Li Cunshen, and served with distinction. When Zhang Chujin's brother Zhang Chuqiu (張處球) was facing him during the siege and begged him to help find a way such that Li Cunxu would spare him and his brothers, Ren pointed out to him that given what Zhang Wenli did, it was difficult for him and his brothers to be spared, but they should at least make overtures to surrender, and if they did, there was a good chance that their sons would be spared. Zhang Chuqiu believed Ren and did so. It was said that it was because of this that, after Zhen eventually fell, while the Zhang brothers were killed, the populace was largely spared.

After the Zhen siege, it appeared that Ren returned to Zhaoyi (which, by that point, was under the acting command of Li Sizhao's son Li Jitao and had been renamed Anyi to observe naming taboo for Li Sizhao), as he was described to have been summoned to Li Cunxu's court, then at Wei Prefecture (魏州, in modern Handan, Hebei), from Anyi, along with the eunuch monitor of the army, Zhang Juhan, in anticipation of Li Cunxu's preparations to take the throne as emperor of a new Later Tang. (However, this caused apprehension on Li Jitao's part, as his taking of the circuit was not with the full sanction of Li Cunxu, and he believed that Li Cunxu's summoning of Ren and Zhang were in anticipation of actions against him, and therefore submitted the circuit to the emperor of Jin's archrival Later Liang, Zhu Zhen.)

== During Later Tang ==
=== During Li Cunxu's reign ===
Shortly after, in 923, Li Cunxu declared himself emperor of Later Tang. He, for the time being, set his capital at Wei (which he made into Xingtang Municipality (興唐)), while making several other cities subsidiary capitals. In particular, he made Zhen the northern capital as a new Zhending Municipality (真定), and made Ren Huan its mayor and defender, as well as the minister of public works (工部尚書, Gongbu Shangshu). Later in the year, Li Cunxu conquered Later Liang and made Luoyang his capital instead. He gave his chief of staff Guo Chongtao the post of military governor of Chengde Circuit (成德, headquartered at Zhending), and Ren was made the commander of the Chengde army and the director of supplies in the northern circuits, as well as continuing to serve as the acting mayor of Zhending. As Guo (at that time) was friendly with Ren, he entrusted the matters of the circuit to Ren in his absence (as he continued to serve as chief of staff to the emperor), and Ren was said to have governed it with grace and love for the people. However, the relationship between Ren and Guo soon deteriorated over Ren's not always following Guo's directions, and Ren's trust for a corrupt judicial officer, Zhang Peng (張彭). It was said that at Zhang's machinations, the funds that were designated for governmental loans to the people were hidden from the books, purportedly for Ren's benefit. Subsequently, when Li Cunxu requisitioned Wang Rong's ladies in waiting to Luoyang, Zhang hid a particularly beautiful one, a Lady Xu, for himself. When this was discovered, Guo summoned Zhang to Luoyang, planning to have him punished. In fear, Zhang revealed the hidden governmental loan funds, and Guo, believing that Zhang was now faithful to him, spared Zhang, and this incident led to a further deterioration of his relationship with Ren. In 925, Ren was recalled to the imperial government to serve only as the minister of public works.

Later in 925, Li Cunxu commissioned his son Li Jiji the Prince of Wei as the overall commander of operations against Later Tang's southwestern neighbor Former Shu, intending to destroy Former Shu. Guo was made Li Jiji's deputy, but was in effective command of the operations. Ren and Li Yu were made strategists for the campaign. (It was said that Guo requested Ren's presence on the campaign because he was afraid that if he did not, Ren might speak against him.) After the army subsequently destroyed Former Shu, Guo wanted to commission Ren as the military governor of Wutai Circuit (武泰, headquartered in modern Chongqing), but Ren declined. When there were subsequent pockets of resistance against Later Tang rule in the Former Shu lands, Guo sent Ren and Zhang Yun (張筠) to wipe these pockets of resistance.

In spring 926, Li Jiji and Guo were about to depart from Former Shu's capital Chengdu back to Luoyang with the army, but Li Jiji was set to leave Ren at Chengdu to serve as acting military governor of Xichuan Circuit (西川, headquartered at Chengdu), until the military governor that Li Cunxu commissioned, Meng Zhixiang, could arrive and take over. However, at that time, an order issued by Li Jiji's mother (Li Cunxu's wife) Empress Liu arrived, ordering Li Jiji to kill Guo. (Empress Liu had become convinced that Guo was about to rebel, while Li Cunxu, while having his suspicions, refused to believe so, and therefore she decided to issue the order herself.) Li Jiji, after some hesitation, carried out the order to kill Guo, and subsequently had Ren take over Guo's responsibilities as his deputy.

Guo's death, and that of another major general, Zhu Youqian, on similarly ungrounded suspicions, caused much unrest in the army ranks and led to a number of mutinies. One of the main ones was by one of the generals most involved in the operations against Former Shu, Li Shaochen, who tried to cut off Li Jiji's path and take over the Shu lands himself. Li Jiji had Ren command the elite soldiers of the army against Li Shaochen. Li Shaochen, believing that Ren was a civilian who did not know military matters, did not take Ren seriously, but Ren repeatedly defeated him, forcing him into defending Han Prefecture (漢州, in modern Deyang, Sichuan) and not being able to go on the offensive. Eventually, Han fell; Li Shaochen tried to flee but was captured in flight, and later executed.

The mutinies continued, however, and in summer 926, Li Cunxu was himself killed in a mutiny at Luoyang itself. One of the generals who had previously rebelled against Li Cunxu, Li Cunxu's adoptive brother Li Siyuan, quickly arrived at Luoyang and claimed the title of regent, initially appearing to be ready to welcome Li Jiji back to Luoyang to succeed to the throne, but soon taking an ambiguous posture. Li Jiji decided to head quickly back to Luoyang. On the way, however, the morale of his army began to collapse, and he committed suicide. Ren took over the command of his army and returned it to Luoyang, where Li Siyuan shortly after took the throne.

=== During Li Siyuan's reign ===
After Li Siyuan took the throne, he commissioned Ren Huan and Zheng Jue as chancellors with the designation Tong Zhongshu Menxia Pingzhangshi (同中書門下平章事). They were also both made Zhongshu Shilang (中書侍郎, the deputy head of the legislative bureau of government (中書省, Zhongshu Sheng)). Ren, in addition, was also made the acting director of the three financial agencies (taxation, treasury, and salt and iron monopolies). It was said that Ren was very conscious of the importance of his duties, and did his best effort to find virtuous and talent people to serve in government and cut off improper ways of advancement. Within a year, the imperial treasury became replenished, and the imperial government was on solid footing, with both the army and civilians comforted. However, his focus on governance drew jealousy and suspicion from Li Siyuan's powerful chief of staff An Chonghui. In particular, at an occasion when Ren and An had a private meeting at Ren's mansion, a beautiful singing girl of Ren's performed. An requested her, but Ren refused, further hurting their relationship.

By 927, two holdover chancellors from Li Cunxu's reign, Doulu Ge and Wei Yue, had been removed. There were thus talks that more chancellors were needed. An's close associate Kong Xun was formerly a Later Liang official and did not want to see more chancellors from former Jin territory, and therefore recommended fellow Later Liang official Cui Xie. Ren recommended Li Qi who, while also formerly a Later Liang official, was disliked by both Zheng and Kong. Kong told An that Li Qi was corrupt, and therefore An recommended Cui, leading to further dispute between An and Ren. Eventually, Li Siyuan decided to commission Cui and Feng Dao as chancellors.

Despite the disputes with An, Ren believed that his long-standing relationship with Li Siyuan allowed him to continue to speak boldly, and many other powerful people came to dislike him. In 927, there was a time when Ren and An were arguing regarding what agency would be responsible for issuing credentials for imperial messengers. Based on long-standing regulations, the credentials were to be issued by the ministry of census (戶部, Hubu), but An requested that the credentials be issued by the palace (i.e., by An, as chief of staff) instead. They got into a lengthy argument before Li Siyuan, and Ren became very loud during the argument. After the imperial meeting was complete, a lady in waiting told Li Siyuan, "When your servant served in the Chang'an palace [(i.e., during Tang)], I did not ever see a chancellor and a chief of staff argue like this. He is showing disrespect to the emperor." Li Siyuan, aggravated, approved An's proposal. Ren thereafter requested to resign his acting directorate of the three financial agencies, and Li Siyuan agreed, transferring those authorities to Meng Gu (孟鵠). Shortly after, Li Siyuan further relieved Ren from his chancellorship altogether, making him an acting advisor to the Crown Prince—an honorary post, as there was no crown prince at the time.

Later in the year, Ren requested retirement to Ci Prefecture (磁州, in modern Handan), and Li Siyuan approved the request. Several months later, when the general Zhu Shouyin the military governor of Xuanwu Circuit (宣武, headquartered in modern Kaifeng, Henan) rebelled against Li Siyuan, An's associates told him that he has to consider whether Ren might have encouraged Zhu's rebellion. An agreed, and persuaded Li Siyuan to issue an order to have Ren commit suicide, despite the protestations of An's associate, the official Zhao Feng. When the imperial messenger reached Ci, Ren summoned his family members to feast with him, and then committed suicide. He was said to have died with a solemn expression. He was later given posthumous honors during the reign of Li Siyuan's adoptive son Li Congke.

== Notes and references ==
- History of the Five Dynasties, vol. 67.
- New History of the Five Dynasties, vol. 28.
- Zizhi Tongjian, vols. 271, 272, 273, 274, 275, 276.
