= Feng Dao =

Chinese inventor, printer, and politician (882–954)

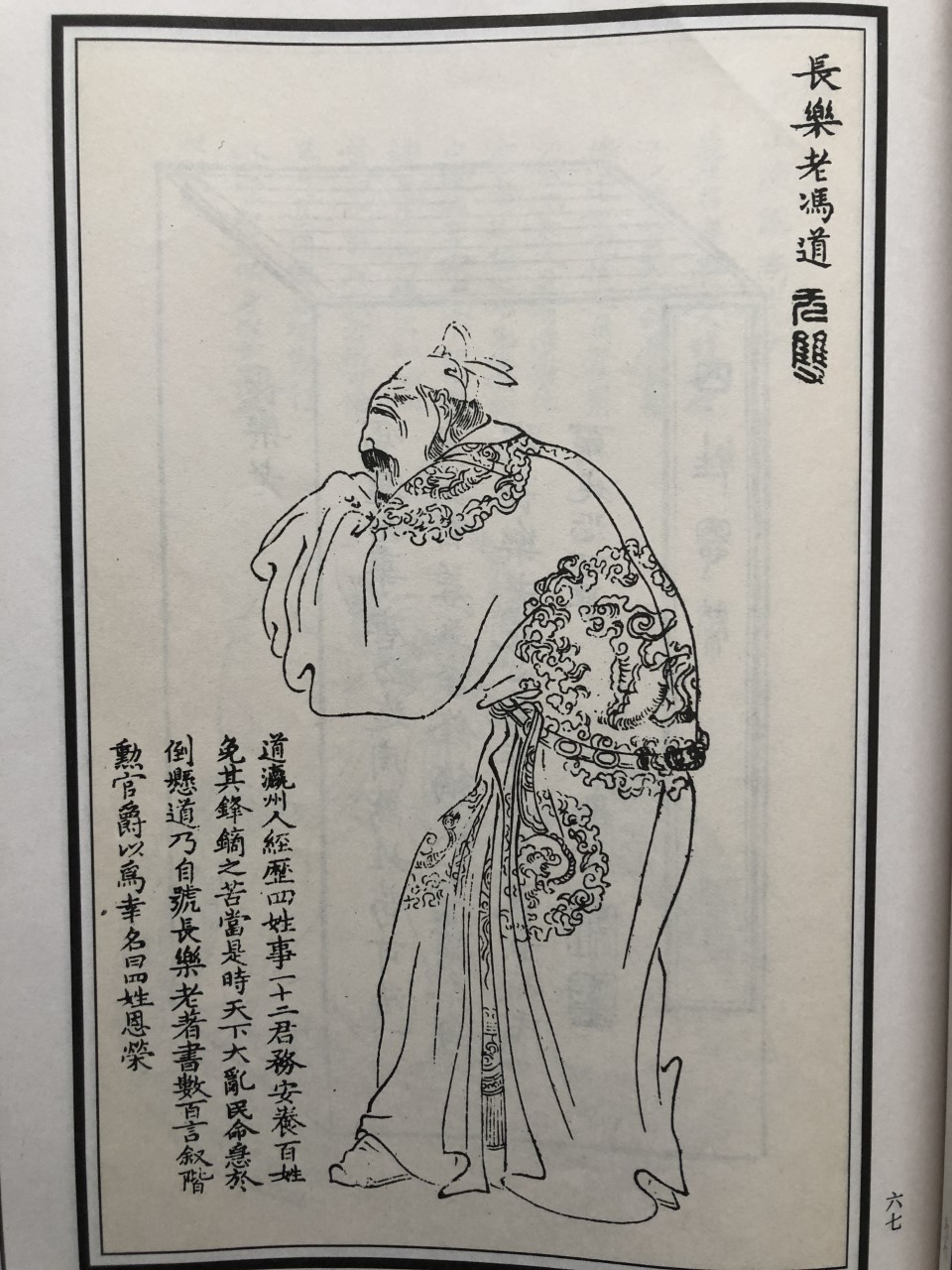
- Feng Dao as depicted in the Wu Shuang Pu
- Born: 882; Jingcheng, Ying Prefecture, Tang dynasty
- Died: 21 May 954 (aged 71–72)
- Occupation: Chancellor
- Known for: Improvements to the printing process

Chinese name
- Traditional Chinese: 馮道
- Simplified Chinese: 冯道
Transcriptions
Standard Mandarin
- Hanyu Pinyin: Féng Dào
- Wade–Giles: Fêng Tao
- IPA: [fə̌ŋ tâʊ]
Middle Chinese
- Middle Chinese: /bɨuŋ dɑuX/

Courtesy name Feng Kedao
- Traditional Chinese: 馮可道
- Simplified Chinese: 冯可道
- Literal meaning: Capable for the Way
Transcriptions
Standard Mandarin
- Hanyu Pinyin: Féng Kědào
- Wade–Giles: Fêng K'o-tao

Title Wenyi Prince of Ying
- Chinese: 瀛文懿王
Transcriptions
Standard Mandarin
- Hanyu Pinyin: Yíng Wényì Wáng
- Wade–Giles: Ying Wên-i Wang

Feng Dao (882 – 21 May 954), courtesy name Kedao, posthumous title the Wenyi Prince of Ying, was a Chinese inventor, printer, and official. He was a government official during the Five Dynasties and Ten Kingdoms period, who served (in chronological order) Jie Yan and the Later Tang, the Later Jin, the Liao, the Later Han, and the Later Zhou dynasties. He was chancellor of the Later Tang, Later Jin, and Later Zhou dynasties.

For his contribution to improving the block-printing process for Chinese works, scholars have compared him to the German inventor and blacksmith Johannes Gutenberg. Traditional historians such as Ouyang Xiu and Sima Guang praised him for his various virtues but also vilified him for not being faithful to a single dynasty but being willing to serve a number of successive dynasties.

== Life ==
=== Early years ===
Feng Dao was born in 882, during the reign of Emperor Xizong of the late Tang. His family was from Jingcheng (景城) in modern Cangzhou, Hebei. His ancestors had been farmers and scholars. Feng Dao himself was said to be virtuous and tolerant in his youth, studious and capable in writing. He did not look down on poor clothes or food and was willing to endure hard labor and poverty to support his parents.

=== Yan ===
At some point, he was invited by Liu Shouguang, one of the major late-Tang warlords, to serve as a secretary at the prefectural government of Liu's capital Youzhou in modern Beijing. By 911, the Tang had fallen to the Later Liang, Liu had first submitted to the Later Liang and then declared his own state of Yan, and Feng had become a military advisor to Liu. In that year, Liu gathered his troops and prepared to attack Yiwu in modern Baoding, Hebei, ruled at the time by a de facto independent military governor (jiedushi) named Wang Chuzhi. Wang was allied with the larger state Jin and supported its opposition to the Later Liang. Feng tried to urge Liu not to attack Yiwu, arguing that the time was inopportune. This angered Liu, who imprisoned him but spared him from execution after others interceded on his behalf.

=== Jin ===
Feng thereafter fled to Jin, where Zhang Chengye, the chief eunuch and a military advisor to Jin's prince Li Cunxu, recommended him to be the secretary general of Jin's capital Taiyuan.

At that time, Li Cunxu was engaged in repeated campaigns to capture territories north of the Yellow River from the Later Liang, and the military matters required frequent drafting of orders, which Li entrusted to Feng Dao.

In or around 919, there was an incident where Li had a dispute with his chief military advisor Guo Chongtao, after Guo had opined that Li was inviting too many officers to his meals and that the number should be reduced. In anger, Li responded, "Is it that we do not get to even decide how many of the people who are willing to die for us would be at our meals? Maybe the army should choose a new commander, and we will return to Taiyuan." He asked Feng to draft a declaration to that effect. Feng took his pen but hesitated to write, and he responded to Li,

Your Royal Highness is now planning to conquer the lands south of the Yellow River and then all the lands under Heaven. Guo Chongtao's request is not overly inappropriate. Even if Your Royal Highness disagreed with him, why make this dispute shock all those near and far, such that our enemies would learn this and believe that you and your subjects are discordant? This cannot be good for your reputation.

Soon thereafter, Guo came to apologize, and the matter was put to rest. It was said that others became impressed with Feng's temerity in advising the prince. It was also said that Feng lived frugally during these campaigns, living in straw huts with no beds and sharing his salary with his staff members. Oftentimes, officers pillaged the region and took beautiful women. Sometimes they would give women to Feng as gifts. Feng would not take them, but would instead find their families and allow their return.

=== Later Tang ===
In 923, Li declared himself the emperor of a new Later Tang dynasty (posthumously remembered as its Emperor Zhuangzong). He made Feng an imperial scholar along with Lu Zhi (盧質). After Li conquered the Later Liang later in the year and took its territory under his control, he made Feng zhongshu sheren (中書舍人), a mid-level official at the Central Secretariat, and a deputy minister of the census (戶部侍郎, hubu shilang) at the Ministry of Revenue.

When Feng's father died shortly afterwards, he left governmental service to observe the traditional multiyear period of mourning at his family home in Jingcheng. At that time, Feng had already become well-known, and the Khitan Empire considered raiding Jingcheng to seize him but, with the Later Tang border forces well prepared, the Khitan raid was called off. While Feng was at Jingcheng, there was a famine in the region. He distributed his wealth to aid the people around him. He was also said to have assisted plowing the fields of those who were unable to farm them or neglectful in doing so.

After the end of Feng's mourning period for his father—probably in 926 given the usual three-year term and based on subsequent events—Emperor Zhuangzong summoned Feng back to the imperial government (then at Luoyang) to again serve as an imperial scholar. By the time Feng had reached Bianzhou (now Kaifeng in Henan), however, the Later Tang state was in great disorder because of the many mutinies that had risen against the emperor, including one led by the emperor's adopted brother Li Siyuan. Bian's prefect Kong Xun urged Feng to remain with him until the situation became clearer, but Feng noted that he was under order to report as soon as possible and continued on his way. Soon thereafter, Emperor Zhuangzong was killed in a mutiny within the capital itself, and Li Siyuan arrived at Luoyang to claim the throne (posthumously remembered as Emperor Mingzong).

Li Siyuan had long been respectful of Feng's capabilities and virtues. As he himself was illiterate and his chief advisor An Chonghui, though literate, was not well learned, An recommended setting up a system where chief scholars would advise the emperor on historical and literary matters. Li thereafter established two posts for imperial scholars at Duanming Hall (端明殿) and commissioned Feng Dao and Zhao Feng to those posts. In 927, the emperor further made both Feng and Cui Xie chancellors with the designation of tong zhongshu menxia pingzhangshi (同中書門下平章事) and title of deputy heads of the Central Secretariat (中書侍郎, Zhongshu shilang). Feng's commission was somewhat of a compromise choice, as the senior chancellor Ren Huan recommended Li Qi while Kong, then one of the emperor's chiefs of staff (shumishi) along with An, pushed for Cui. While serving as chancellor, Feng often pointed out to the emperor the difficulties that farmers faced, and Emperor Mingzong collected the poems that Feng wrote about such difficulties, often having attendants read the poems to him. The emperor created him Duke of Shiping.

An had long borne a grudge against Emperor Mingzong's adoptive son Li Congke, who was then the military governor (jiedushi) of Huguo (護國) around modern Yuncheng, Shanxi. In 930, An encouraged Li Congke's subordinate Yang Yanwen (楊彥溫) to mutiny and seize Huguo's capital Hezhong (河中), forcing Li Congke to return to Luoyang. An then had Feng and Zhao submit petitions asking for Li Congke to be punished, but Emperor Mingzong refused their request as well as An's subsequent request as well. Later in the year, Emperor Mingzong and An had more open disputes over the handling of the rebellions by Meng Zhixiang, the military governor of Xichuan (西川) around modern Chengdu, Sichuan, and Dong Zhang, the military governor of Dongchuan (東川) around modern Mianyang, Sichuan. An submitted a resignation, which many officials urged him to withdraw. Feng believed that An's best course of action at that time was to resign and so urged the other officials not to stop An from resigning, but Zhao disagreed and was able to persuade An to remain chief of staff. (Feng turned out to be correct as, after the rift between Emperor Mingzong and An became greater, the emperor had An demoted and then killed in 931.

In 933, Emperor Mingzong became gravely ill. His oldest son Li Congrong, generally considered his presumptive heir, was fearful that the imperial officials would oppose his succession and therefore decided to try to seize power by force even before Emperor Mingzong's death. Li Congrong's mutiny ended in failure, and he was killed. Some of the key officials urged the mass execution of Li Congrong's staff members, but Feng Dao and Feng Yun urged leniency and so most of them were only exiled. Emperor Mingzong died shortly after and was succeeded by his son Li Conghou, the Prince of Song, posthumously remembered as Emperor Min. Feng Dao continued to serve Emperor Min as chancellor.

In 934, Emperor Min's chief advisors Feng Yun and Zhu Hongzhao wanted to reduce the power of Li Congke, then the military governor of Fengxiang (鳳翔) around modern Baoji, Shaanxi, and Emperor Min's brother-in-law Shi Jingtang, the military governor of Hedong (河東) around modern Taiyuan. They therefore issued a series of transfer orders that transferred Li Congke to Hedong and Shi to Chengde around modern Shijiazhuang, Hebei. Li Congke considered this a trap and therefore rebelled. The imperial army sent to attack him mutinied and joined his rebellion, and he approached Luoyang while Emperor Min fled. As Li Congke was ready to enter Luoyang, Feng Dao—in an action that was criticized both at that time and in posterity—requested that the official Lu Dao (盧導) draft a petition urging Li Congke to take the throne, to be distributed to various officials for ratification. Lu refused to draft the petition and rebuked Feng. Still, subsequently, an edict was issued in the name of Emperor Mingzong's wife, the Empress Dowager Cao, deposing Emperor Min and making Li Congke emperor. Emperor Min was subsequently killed in exile. Li Congke had Feng Dao oversee construction of Emperor Mingzong's tomb. Once the tomb was completed, he sent Feng out of the capital to serve as the military governor of Kuangguo (匡國) around modern Weinan, Shaanxi, still carrying the tong zhongshu menxia pingzhangshi honorary chancellor title. While at Kuangguo's capital Tongzhou (同州), Feng's governance was said to be lenient. In 935, Li Congke recalled him from Kuangguo to serve as sikong (司空), a highly honorable post as one of the Three Excellencies but one that lacked real authority. Indeed, as there had long not been anyone who served merely as one of the Three Excellencies without a substantive post (Feng himself had served as sikong as well when he was chancellor earlier, as an additional title), no one in the imperial government knew what the sikong was supposed to do on his own. The chancellor Lu Wenji thought that the sikong was supposed to be in charge of cleaning the altar at imperial sacrifices—a ceremonial duty that Feng stated that he would be honored to carry out—but soon Lu figured out that it was inappropriate to ask the highly honored Feng to actually carry out cleanings and so did not mention it again.

=== Later Jin ===
In 936, Li Congke ordered Shi Jingtang's transfer to Tianping (天平) around modern Tai'an, Shandong. Shi likewise considered this a trap and likewise revolted. Aided by the Khitan Empire's Emperor Taizong, he declared himself emperor of the new dynasty of the Later Jin (posthumously remembered as its Emperor Gaozu) and marched on Luoyang. After Shi defeated the Later Tang army sent to subdue him, Li Congke committed suicide along with his wife the empress Liu, his children, and Empress Dowager Cao. The victorious Later Jin emperor then entered Luoyang. Later in the year, he gave Feng Dao, in addition to his nonsubstantive sikong title, the titles tong zhongzhu menxia pingzhangshi and deputy head of the Chancellory (門下侍郎, Menxia shilang), thus making him chancellor again.

In 938, Emperor Gaozu honored the Khitan emperor as his "father emperor" while referring to himself as the "son emperor" and also offered honored titles to Emperor Taizong's mother Empress Dowager Shulü Ping. As a sign of further respect, he sent Feng and another senior official, Liu Xu, to Khitan to offer those honors as well as gifts for the emperor and empress dowager. The mission was undertaken despite Emperor Gaozu's worry that Emperor Taizong, impressed by Feng, might detain him. Feng pointed out that given Khitan's aid to Emperor Gaozu, he was willing to take the risk on the emperor's behalf. Emperor Taizong did consider keeping the scholar but eventually allowed Feng to return to Later Jin.

In 939, Emperor Gaozu abolished the office of shumishi, believing that it had grown overly powerful and gave its powers to his chancellors, particularly Feng. He was soon given the titles of situ (司徒), another one of the Three Excellencies, and head of the Chancellory (侍中, shizhong). He was also created the Duke of Lu. It was said that at one point, Feng offered to resign on account of illness. Emperor Gaozu sent his nephew Shi Chonggui, the Prince of Zheng and most honored male member of the imperial family at that point, as Emperor Gaozu's sons—except for the young Shi Chongrui—had all been killed either in his own rebellion against the Later Tang or in rebellions against him. Shi Chonggui dissuaded Feng from resigning, relaying the emperor's comment, "If you do not return, I will personally come visit you." Feng returned to continue to serve as chancellor, and it was said that no one was more honored in the administration. Once back, Feng and his fellow chancellor Li Song recommended that Emperor Gaozu's brother-in-law Du Chongwei, then deputy commander of the imperial guards, replace his commander Liu Zhiyuan (later Emperor Gaozu of the Later Han), earning Liu's resentment.

Because Shi Chongrui was young, Emperor Gaozu of the Later Jin never designated him as the crown prince and heir. However, in 942, when the emperor grew ill, he summoned Feng, had Shi Chongrui come out to bow to Feng, and put Shi Chongrui in Feng's lap, hinting strongly that he wanted Feng to support Shi Chongrui to succeed him. When Emperor Gaozu died soon thereafter, however, Feng discussed the matter with the Jing Yanguang, then commander of the imperial guards. Feng and Jing both felt that, given the perilous state of the Later Jin, an older emperor was needed. They therefore supported Shi Chonggui, then titled Prince of Qi, to be emperor. Shi Chonggui gave Feng the honorary title of taiwei (太尉), another of the Three Excellencies), and created him Duke of Yan.

Once emperor, Shi Chonggui ended his predecessor's submissive approach towards the Khitan Empire. In particular, Shi Chonggui took the position advocated by Jing, no longer referring to himself as "son" and "your subject" when writing to Emperor Taizong but instead only as "grandson". This left the personal relationship intact while disavowing Later Jin as a Khitan vassal staten. Li Song tried to argue against this stance but, with Feng neither opposing nor supporting it, Shi Chonggui used the format in his letter notifying the Khitans of Emperor Gaozu's death and his own succession. This displeased Emperor Taizong, who wrote back rebuking Shi Chonggui for taking the throne without Khitan approval. Emperor Taizong took no overt hostile action at that time but, by 944, there were repeated Khitan incursions into Later Jin territory. Zhao Yanshou, a Chinese general fighting for the Khitan Empire, advocated a general campaign and Emperor Taizong began to go along, promising Zhao would be made vassal emperor of the Central Plains if they succeeded in overthrowing the Later Jin. As Feng developed a reputation for indecision, Shi Chonggui returned him to Kuangguo to serve as its military governor, carrying the shizhong honorary chancellor title. After about a year there, he was transferred to Weisheng (威勝) around modern Nanyang, Henan, with the title of director of the Central Secretariat (中書令, Zhongshu ling) as an honorary chancellor title.

=== Liao ===
In 946, Emperor Taizong of the Khitan Empire defeated Du Wei (as Du Chongwei was known after he removed the 重 character from his name to observe naming taboo after Shi Chonggui's ascension as emperor) and then convinced him to surrender entirely rather than retreating, regrouping, and continuing to fight. Taizong was then able to advance all the way to the Later Jin capital at Kaifeng, forcing Shi Chonggui to surrender. The next year, rather than promoting Zhao as promised, he adopted Chinese imperial regalia, declared the enlarged Khitan Empire the Great Liao dynasty, and summoned the Later Jin military governors to Kaifeng for a personal audience. Feng Dao, still commanding Weisheng, went and submitted to the new regime. As both Zhao Yanshou and Zhang Li (張礪) had recommended Li Song, Emperor Taizong treated both Feng and Li with respect. He made Li shumishi while giving Feng the title of acting taifu (太傅) and, while not officially a shumishi, had him working out of that office and consulted on important matters. It was said that there was a conversation where Emperor Taizong asked him, "How do I save all the people under Heaven?" Feng responded, "At this time, not even if the Buddha reentered the world could the people be saved. Only the Emperor can save them." It was believed that these words, along with an intercession by Zhao, were the reason that Emperor Taizong did not carry out mass executions of his new Han Chinese subjects. Meanwhile, Emperor Taizong openly disliked the Later Jin general Liu Jixun (劉繼勳) for his involvement with planning Shi Chonggui's anti-Khitan campaign. Liu responded by accusing Feng and Jing Yangguang of being behind the campaign, which prompted the emperor to rebuke him for blaming Feng and to order the general removed to the far northern Liao city of Huanglong (黃龍) in modern Changchun, Jilin.

By the spring of 947, however, Emperor Taizong was faced with numerous mutinies by his Han Chinese soldiers due to his harsh raids against the population. He decided to leave his brother-in-law Xiao Han in charge of Kaifeng while he himself took the imperial treasury and the empire's key officials north, back to securely Khitan lands. He died on the way. The Liao generals supported his nephew Yelü Ruan as his successor (posthumously remembered as Emperor Shizong). Yelü Ruan first imprisoned Zhao (who still coveted the throne) and then declared himself emperor. Meanwhile, amid the power vacuum, Liu Zhiyuan declared himself emperor of a new Later Han dynasty and advanced south, quickly entering Kaifeng as Xiao withdrew from it and overrunning most of Liao's southern territory, previously held by the Later Jin.

Within the Khitan Empire itself, the empress dowager Shulü opposed Emperor Shizong's ascension and sent an army against him. He defeated it and subsequently put her under house arrest. During the campaign, however, he left the general Yelü Mada as prefect over Heng around modern Shijiazhuang. Emperor Taizong had died nearby and many of the imperial officials headed north—including Feng and the other former Later Jin chancellors Li Song and He Ning—had remained in the prefectural seat at Hengzhou (now Zhengding). Yelü Mada was corrupt and harsh, putting the Han soldiers under severe restrictions and drawing their discontent. When Emperor Shizong subsequently sent an order for the Later Jin officials to continue to advance north to attend to the funeral of Emperor Taizong, the Han soldiers mutinied under the officer Bai Zairong (白再榮). During the battle inside Hengzhou, Feng, Li Song, and He Ning followed the advice of Li Gu and personally went to encourage the Chinese soldiers, who then rallied and successfully expelled Yelü Mada and his Khitans. The soldiers then offered the military governorship of Chengde to Feng, but Feng declined the post as better suited to a military officer. Bai then became acting military governor and submitted Chengde and its prefectures (including Heng) to the Later Han.

=== Later Han ===
Feng Dao, Li Song, and He Ning subsequently went to then-Later Han capital Kaifeng. Emperor Gaozu immediately commissioned Li Song and He Ning with honorary titles (albeit not substantive ones), but did not commission Feng until spring 948 (when he gave Feng the even more honored title of Taishi (太師), but no substantive offices).

At the time of Emperor Gaozu's death in spring 948 (shortly after Feng was commissioned Taishi), Emperor Gaozu had left directions to the officials and generals he entrusted his son Liu Chengyou (Emperor Yin) to (Su Fengji, Yang Bin, Shi Hongzhao, and Guo Wei) to watch Du Chongwei (who had restored his original name after Later Jin's fall) closely, and shortly after Emperor Gaozu's death, the four, announcing the order as an order from Emperor Gaozu, had Du put to death. This caused great apprehension to Li Shouzhen, who had also become a Later Han subject. Later in spring 948, Li therefore rebelled at his post as military governor of Huguo and claimed the title of Prince of Qin, in alliance with Wang Jingchong the military governor of Fengxiang and Zhao Siwan, a rebel officer who had seized control of Jinchang Circuit (晉昌, headquartered in modern Xi'an, Shaanxi). The leading officials decided to have Guo lead the imperial guard troops against Li. Before Guo departed, he went to see Feng to request Feng's opinion; Feng opined to him that since Li had long led the imperial guards that Guo would be commanding, he needed to destroy their affinity to Li by rewarding them greatly regardless of impact on the imperial treasury. Guo agreed, and it was said that this move made Guo popular among the imperial guards such that Li had no ability to sway them. Guo was thereafter able to defeat Li in 949, and Li committed suicide; Wang subsequently also did so, and Zhao, after initially surrendering to Later Han forces sent against him, reconsidered, and was then killed by Later Han troops, ending the three rebellions.

In 950, Feng wrote an autobiographical note titled the Self-Description of the Old Man from Changle (長樂老自述) that discussed family history and his career, including the honors that had been bestowed on him and his family members by the succeeding dynasties. (This text drew severe criticism from the later Song dynasty historians Ouyang Xiu (the lead editor of the New History of the Five Dynasties) and Sima Guang (the lead editor of the Zizhi Tongjian), both of whom described Feng as disloyal and the most wicked among officials as a result.)

In winter 950, Emperor Yin, angry that Yang, Shi, and Guo, along with the chancellor Wang Zhang, had held onto power and not let him make decisions alone, had Yang, Shi, and Wang killed. Guo, who was commanding an army to the north and not at the capital Kaifeng at that time, escaped the fate, but Emperor Yin still had his family and that of Guo's army monitor Wang Jun killed. Guo thereafter rebelled and took the army toward Kaifeng, defeating the imperial army that Emperor Yin personally commanded to face him. Emperor Yin fled and was killed in flight. When Guo subsequently entered the capital, Feng did not bow to him, but accepted his bows, stating to him calmly, "This trip you, Shizhong, undertook, was not an easy one." This apparently set back Guo's plan to take the throne himself, and Guo subsequently led the officials to greet Emperor Gaozu's wife Empress Dowager Li, who decreed that Emperor Gaozu's nephew Liu Yun, whom Emperor Gaozu had adopted as a son and who was then the military governor of Wuning Circuit (武寧, headquartered in modern Xuzhou, Jiangsu), be made emperor. She then sent Feng, along with the officials Wang Du (王度) and Zhao Shangjiao (趙上交), to Wuning's capital Xu Prefecture (徐州) to escort Liu Yun back to the capital to take the throne.

However, the officers under Guo were largely against supporting another member of the Liu family as emperor, as they were fearful of being punished for having sacked the capital. They subsequently mutinied at Chan Prefecture (澶州, in modern Puyang, Henan) and supported Guo as emperor. Guo accepted, and headed back into Kaifeng, softening Empress Dowager Li's resistance by promising to honor her like a mother, while sending his officer Guo Chongwei to intercept Liu Yun's train. When Guo Chongwei arrived, he took over Liu Yun's escorting forces and delivered Guo Wei's orders, summoning Feng back to the capital, leaving Liu Yun with Zhao and Wang, and effectively putting Liu Yun under house arrest. (Liu Yun was later killed.) In spring 951, Guo Wei took the throne as Emperor Taizu of a new Later Zhou.

=== Later Zhou ===
Shortly after the new Later Zhou emperor took the throne, he made Feng Dao Zhongshu Ling, thus restoring him to chancellorship.

Later in the year, the general Murong Yanchao, a half brother of Later Han's Emperor Gaozu, who initially submitted to Later Zhou, rebelled at Taining Circuit (泰寧, headquartered in modern Jining, Shandong). After Murong was defeated and committed suicide in early 952, Emperor Taizu considered slaughtering Murong's soldiers. However, the imperial scholar Dou Yi (竇儀) met with Feng and fellow chancellor Fan Zhi and persuaded them to argue to Emperor Taizu (along with Dou himself) that the Taining soldiers were merely forced into combat by Murong. They were able to persuade Emperor Taizu, who thereafter pardoned the Taining soldiers.

Later that year, another imperial scholar, Xu Taifu (許台符), had requested that Ge Yanyu (葛延遇) and Li Cheng (李澄), who had falsely accused Li Song of plotting to join Li Shouzhen's rebellion in 948 and whose false accusations led to the slaughter of Li Song and his family, be put to death. Feng opined that there had been a chance in dynasties and many general pardons in the interim, so the charges should not be pursued. However, fellow chancellor Wang Jun was impressed by Xu's fervor to avenge Li Song, and recommended Ge's and Li Cheng's death. Emperor Taizu thereafter put Ge and Li Cheng to death.

In 953, believing that Wang was growing too powerful and too insolent in his behavior (including trying to prevent Emperor Taizu's adoptive son Guo Rong from coming to the capital Kaifeng to pay homage to the emperor, in fear of Guo Rong's diverting powers from him), Emperor Taizu, after consulting with Feng and the other chancellors, forced Wang into medical retirement. (After Wang's retirement and subsequent death, Guo Rong was able to stay at the capital and thereafter would remain in the power center.)

Emperor Taizu died in 954 and was succeeded by Guo Rong (as Emperor Shizong). Shortly after Emperor Shizong's enthronement, even before Emperor Taizu's burial, Li Yun's biological father Liu Min (né Liu Chong), who had declared himself emperor and legitimate successor of the Later Han throne at Taiyuan, shortly after Emperor Taizu's proclamation of Later Zhou (and whose state, while claiming to be a continuation of Later Han, became known historically as Northern Han), decided to launch a major attack on Later Zhou with Liao support, hoping to reestablish Han control over the central plains. Emperor Shizong decided to react by personally leading an army against Liu Min. Feng and many other officials had reservations about having the new emperor personally lead the army (arguing that Emperor Shizong's absence may lead to other rebellions), which led to a heated exchange recorded by historians between Emperor Shizong and Feng:

Emperor Shizong: "When Emperor Taizong of Tang conquered the territory under the heavens, he always fought personally. How can I avoid this hard work?"
Feng: "I do not know that Your Imperial Majesty can be compared to Emperor Taizong of Tang."
Emperor Shizong: "Our forces are so strong, and defeating Liu Chong will be like a mountain crushing an egg!"
Feng: "I do not know that Your Imperial Majesty can be compared to a mountain."

The tone of the exchange displeased Emperor Shizong, but the chancellor Wang Pu agreed with Emperor Shizong's idea of personally leading an army, and so Emperor Shizong did so anyway. As Emperor Shizong was ready to depart, he commissioned Feng to be in charge of accompanying Emperor Taizu's casket to the imperial tomb and overseeing its burial. Emperor Shizong ended up crushing the Northern Han army on the campaign, while Feng died before Emperor Shizong's victorious return.

== Legacy ==
In 932, Feng Dao ordered the Confucian classics printed using an improved form of block printing. About a century after the invention of block printing Feng Dao significantly improved the process and utilized it as a political tool. The project was completed in 953, when the completed printing blocks were presented to Emperor Taizu of Later Zhou. He is generally regarded as the inventor of modern printing in China, as Johannes Gutenberg is in Europe. The first standard edition of the Confucian classics with commentary was published in 130 volumes between 932 and 953 in what is now Xi'an. The version of the text that Feng used came from the text that the Tang chancellor Zheng Tan had ordered carved on stone at then-Tang capital Chang'an. The improved printing technology quickly spread, with the earliest known Korean book printed in similar fashion in 950.

"The work of Feng Tao and his associates for printing in China may be compared to the work of Gutenberg in Europe. There had been printing before Gutenberg—block printing certainly and very likely experimentation in typography also—but Gutenberg's Bible heralded a new day in the civilization of Europe. In the same way there had been printing before Feng Tao, but it was an obscure art that had little effect on the culture of the country. Feng Tao's Classics made printing a power that ushered in the renaissance of the Sung era."

Feng Dao is depicted in the Wu Shuang Pu by Jin Guliang.
