= An Chonghui =

Shumishi An Chonghui
- 安重誨
- Modern portrait of An Chonghui

Shumishi of Later Tang
- In office 925 – 931
- Monarch: Li Siyuan

Personal details
- Born: Ying Prefecture (應州, modern Shuozhou, Shanxi)
- Died: June 25, 931 Hezhong

Military service
- Rank: Zhongmenshi (中門使)
- Battles/wars: Zhu Wen campaigns against Zhu Xuan; Li Siyuan campaigns against Li Cunxu

An Chonghui (d. June 25, 931?) (Chinese: 安重誨; Wade–Giles: An Ch'ung-hui, fl. 10th century) was the chief of staff (Shumishi) and chief advisor to Li Siyuan (Emperor Mingzong) (r. 926–933) of the Chinese Five Dynasties and Ten Kingdoms period state Later Tang.

For most of Emperor Mingzong's reign, An was the most powerful figure at court, making key military and political decisions that, in his eyes, sought to strengthen the authority of the Later Tang imperial state. However, his ruthless actions toward political enemies—including Emperor Mingzong's adoptive son Li Congke the Prince of Lu—created much resentment. After the campaign against the regional warlords Meng Zhixiang and Dong Zhang, which An instigated, stalled, An was forced to retire, and then was killed in retirement, under accusations that he had alienated Meng, Dong, and the Later Tang nominal vassal Qian Liu the King of Wuyue, from the Later Tang emperor. He was said to have, at his death, lamented that he was not able to rid the state of Li Congke.

== Background ==
It is not known when An Chonghui was born, but it is known that his family was from Ying Prefecture (應州, in modern Shuozhou, Shanxi) and that his ancestors were tribal chiefs in the region. His father An Fuqian (安福遷) was known for ferocity in battle and became an officer under the late-Tang dynasty major warlord Li Keyong (founder of Jin) the military governor (jiedushi) of Hedong Circuit (河東, headquartered in modern Taiyuan, Shanxi). In 894, when Li Keyong's allies Zhu Xuan the military governor of Tianping Circuit (天平, headquartered in modern Tai'an, Shandong) and Zhu Xuan's cousin Zhu Jin the military governor of Taining Circuit (泰寧, headquartered in modern Jining, Shandong) sought aid from Li Keyong as they were under attack by Li Keyong's archrival Zhu Quanzhong the military governor of Xuanwu Circuit (宣武, headquartered in modern Kaifeng, Henan), Li Keyong sent An Fuqian and two brothers—older brother An Fushun (安福順) and An Fuqing (安福慶), who was likely older as well—with 500 cavalry soldiers, to aid Zhu Xuan and Zhu Jin. An Fuqian was subsequently killed in battle when fighting the Xuanwu forces.

== During Li Cunxu's reign ==
The first historical reference made to An Chonghui himself was in 916, by which time Tang had ended, and the sons of Li Keyong and Zhu Quanzhong were ruling separate and rival realms that they inherited from their fathers—Li Keyong's biological son Li Cunxu as the Prince of Jin and Zhu Quanzhong's son Zhu Zhen as the Emperor of Later Liang. In 916, Li Cunxu made his adoptive brother Li Siyuan the military governor of Anguo Circuit (安國, headquartered in modern Xingtai, Hebei). An was then serving under Li Siyuan with the officer rank of Zhongmenshi (中門使) and faithful to Li Siyuan, and Li Siyuan trusted him deeply. He was friendly with Li Siyuan's sons Li Congrong and Li Conghou from Li Congrong's and Li Conghou's childhood, and the brothers respected him. However, he did not have a good relationship with Li Siyuan's adoptive son Li Congke, as there was a time when they were drinking and got into an argument, and Li Congke beat him badly. Li Congke later apologized, but An continued to bear a grudge against Li Congke.

For more than a decade, An followed Li Siyuan in his campaigns serving under Li Cunxu, who eventually declared himself emperor of a new Later Tang (as its Emperor Zhuangzong) and conquered Later Liang. However, by 926, the Later Tang realm was overrun by mutinies after Emperor Zhuangzong had, without good cause, executed two of the major generals, Guo Chongtao and Zhu Youqian. When Li Siyuan was sent to battle the mutineers at Yedu (鄴都, in modern Handan, Hebei), Li Siyuan's own forces mutinied and forced him to join the Yedu mutineers. After Li Siyuan freed himself from the Yedu mutineers, he considered returning to his own circuit Chengde Circuit (成德, headquartered in modern Shijiazhuang, Hebei), which he was then the military governor of, to consider his next step, but An and Li Siyuan's deputy Li Shaozhen pointed out that that exposed him to be defenseless against charges that another general, Li Shaorong, might lay against him, convinced him to head south back toward the capital Luoyang instead. Subsequently, with Li Shaorong indeed accusing Li Siyuan of treason and cutting off Li Siyuan's attempts to send messengers to Emperor Zhuangzong to defend himself, Li Siyuan decided to indeed rebel, and therefore had An draft summons on his behalf, asking other generals to join his army, as he advanced toward Kaifeng (Bian prefecture).

Li Siyuan quickly entered Kaifeng, and then from there advanced toward Luoyang. Emperor Zhuangzong organized an army to try to resist him, but was shortly thereafter killed in a mutiny at Luoyang. When Li Siyuan arrived at Luoyang, he was welcomed into the city and assumed, for the time, the title of regent. He made An his chief of staff, with Zhang Yanlang, whose daughter was An's daughter-in-law, serving as An's deputy. Meanwhile, An and Li Shaozhen tried to get the political situation ready for Li Siyuan's eventual enthronement, by killing Li Cunxu's brothers Li Cunque (李存確) the Prince of Tong and Li Cunji (李存紀) the Prince of Ya, without Li Siyuan's prior approval. Later, after Li Cunxu's oldest son Li Jiji the Prince of Wei committed suicide as his army refused to follow him in a campaign against Li Siyuan, Li Siyuan took the throne (as Emperor Mingzong).

== During Li Siyuan's reign ==
=== As shumishi ===
==== During the Tiancheng era (926–930) ====
An Chonghui quickly became the most powerful advisor for Emperor Mingzong, and, as Emperor Mingzong was illiterate, he relied on An to read to him the petitions coming from throughout the realm, although An, realizing that he was also not capable of handling all these petitions, recommended the imperial scholars Feng Dao and Zhao Feng to serve in that role. As chief advisor, however, he quickly developed a rivalry with the chancellor Ren Huan, as Ren was putting much of his own imprint on the governance, drawing An's jealousy. Meanwhile, Emperor Mingzong wanted to reward An by commissioning him as the military governor of Shannan East Circuit (山南東道, headquartered in modern Xiangyang, Hubei) and serving remotely (with an acting military governor at the circuit itself). An believed that Shannan East was too important of a circuit to lack an actual military governor at the circuit, and therefore declined; Emperor Mingzong subsequently agreed.

Despite his faithfulness to Emperor Mingzong, An was also known for his arrogance and violence. When the minor official Ma Yan (馬延) accidentally collided with his train, An had Ma executed on the spot. When the imperial censor (御史, yushi) Li Qi reported this to Emperor Mingzong, Emperor Mingzong reacted, at An's request, by issuing an edict blaming the executed-Ma for the incident and declaring that the people should be careful in respecting the senior officials of the state. Later, in 927, An and Ren had a major disagreement about whom to recommend to be chancellors to replace two chancellors recently removed from office, Doulu Ge and Wei Yue; Ren recommended Li Qi while An recommended Cui Xie at the suggestion of his close associate Kong Xun; Emperor Mingzong ultimately chose Cui and Feng to serve as chancellors, replacing Doulu and Wei. Shortly after, Emperor Mingzong also bestowed chancellor titles on An and Kong, with An receiving the greater title of Shizhong (侍中), making him more honored than other chancellors. Emperor Mingzong eventually became displeased at Ren's continuous arguments with An, believing that to be an affront to himself, and when Ren, noticing the emperor's displeasure, offered to resign his secondary position as the director of the three financial agencies (taxation, treasury, and salt and iron monopolies), Emperor Mingzong accepted the resignation. In fall 927, Ren retired completely to Ci Prefecture (磁州, in modern Handan, Hebei), but shortly after, when the general Zhu Shouyin the military governor of Xuanwu Circuit (宣武, headquartered in modern Kaifeng) rebelled, An, believing that Ren could be complicit, requested Emperor Mingzong to order Ren to commit suicide, and Emperor Mingzong did so.

By late 926, An had begun to be concerned about two powerful military governors that Emperor Zhuangzong had commissioned prior to his death to govern the former territory of Former Shu—Meng Zhixiang the military governor of Xichuan Circuit (西川, headquartered in modern Chengdu, Sichuan) and Dong Zhang the military governor of Dongchuan Circuit (東川, headquartered in modern Mianyang, Sichuan), because Meng was closely related to Emperor Zhuangzong (as his wife was a daughter of Li Keyong's and therefore a full-elder-sister of Emperor Zhuangzong's) and Dong was a favored general of Emperor Zhuangzong's. Meng was also acting fairly independently as the military governor of Xichuan Circuit, as he refused to yield tax revenues to the imperial administration. The official Li Yan (李嚴) volunteered to serve as a monitor to the Xichuan army, believing that he could help curb Meng's exercise of authority, and An then sent him to Xichuan. Meng subsequently had Li executed, and another officer, Zhu Hongzhao, whom An sent to Dongchuan to serve as Dong's deputy military governor for a similar reason, fled back to Luoyang.

In late 927, Yang Pu the king of Later Tang's southeastern neighbor Wu declared himself emperor, thus putting himself at the same level, title-wise, as the Later Tang emperor. An advocated a campaign against Wu, but Emperor Mingzong ruled against it. However, subsequently, apparently with Emperor Mingzong's approval, An cut off the diplomatic communications between the two states, which had been frequent ever since Emperor Zhuangzong's destruction of Later Liang.

In 928, a rift developed between An and Kong, over the fact that Kong advised An against giving a daughter to one of Emperor Mingzong's sons in marriage, on the rationale that it would be improper for someone already so powerful to further engender himself to the emperor by a marriage of their children—and then himself gave a daughter in marriage to be the wife of Emperor Mingzong's son Li Conghou. An thus had Kong expelled from the imperial government to serve as the defender of Luoyang (as Emperor Mingzong was himself at Kaifeng at that time). However, when An had a dispute with Wang Jianli the military governor of Chengde, with accusations flying both ways—An accusing Wang of being aligned with the semi-independent warlord Wang Du the military governor of Yiwu Circuit (義武, headquartered in modern Baoding, Hebei), while Wang Jianli accused An of allying himself with Zhang Yanlang and creating a power bloc. Emperor Mingzong, unhappy with what he saw of An, briefly considered replacing him with Wang Jianli, but ultimately did not do so, but kept Wang at Kaifeng as a chancellor and the director of the three financial agencies. Emperor Mingzong subsequently gave An the additional title of mayor of Henan Municipality (河南, i.e., the Luoyang region).

Also in 928, Wang Du, who had been concerned about an imperial government takeover of his circuit, partly because An had begun to reimpose imperial laws on Yiwu whereas Yiwu had acted independently previously, tried to assassinate the imperial general Wang Yanqiu, whose army was then stationed near Yiwu's capital Ding Prefecture (定州) in anticipation of a potential Khitan attack. Emperor Mingzong declared a general campaign against Wang Du, with Wang Yanqiu in command. In 929, Wang Yanqiu was able to capture Ding Prefecture, despite Wang Du's being aided by the Khitan general Tunei (禿餒); Wang Du committed suicide, allowing the imperial government to take over Yiwu.

One of Emperor Mingzong's sons or nephews, Li Congcan (李從璨), had long not been willing to yield himself to An. In 929, there was an incident in which Li Congcan was drunk at a feast and, in that drunkenness, sat on the emperor's seat as a joke. An took this opportunity to report this to Emperor Mingzong and recommend Li Congcan's death; as a result, Emperor Mingzong ordered Li Congcan to commit suicide.

Meanwhile, An was also in dispute with Later Tang's vassal, Qian Liu the King of Wuyue, as he was displeased at Qian's arrogant wording while writing him. In 929, there was an incident where Emperor Mingzong sent his attendants Wu Zhaoyu (烏昭遇) and Han Mei (韓玫) as emissaries to Wuyue. Han, who had an enmity with Wu, reported, upon return from Wuyue, that Wu not only bowed to Qian and referred to himself as Qian's subject, but also revealed secrets to Qian. An recommended that Wu be ordered to commit suicide, and subsequently ordered Qian to retire with the title of Taishi (太師), stripping him of all other titles, while putting all Wuyue emissaries under arrest. Qian had his sons submit petitions proclaiming his innocence, but An (and Emperor Mingzong) ignored them.

An, around the same time, was continuing to prepare for the possibility of confrontation with Meng and Dong, by carving out territories from their circuits—with Li Renju (李仁矩) serving as the military governor of Baoning Circuit (保寧, headquartered in modern Nanchong, Sichuan), Xia Luqi (夏魯奇) serving as the military governor of Wuxin Circuit (武信, headquartered in modern Suining, Sichuan), and An's brother-in-law Wu Qianyu (武虔裕) serving as the prefect of Mian Prefecture (綿州, in modern Mianyang), each reinforced with soldiers from the imperial army. This, in turn, led to fears from both Meng and Dong that the imperial government would soon be acting against them. Despite their prior rivalry, Meng and Dong entered into an alliance and prepared to jointly fight the Later Tang imperial government.

==== During the Changxing era (930–931) ====
Meanwhile, An Chonghui continuously accused Li Congke, who was then the military governor of Huguo Circuit (護國, headquartered in modern Yuncheng, Shanxi), but Emperor Mingzong took no heed. In 930, An instructed Li Congke's officer Yang Yanwen (楊彥溫) to expel Li Congke, and Yang did so when Li Congke happened to be out of the city (Huguo's capital Hezhong Municipality (河中)) on a hunt, by closing the city gates and refusing to let Li Congke reenter. When Li Congke questioned why Yang was doing what he was doing, Yang responded, "It is not that I, Yang Yanwen, turns back on your graciousness, but I received an instruction from the Office of the Chief of Staff, asking you, Lord, to report to the imperial government." When Li Congke reported this to Emperor Mingzong, Emperor Mingzong summoned him to Luoyang, where the emperor was at the time. An disclaimed any involvement and advocated sending an army to attack Yang. Emperor Mingzong thus sent the generals Suo Zitong (索自通) and Yao Yanchou (藥彥稠) to attack Yang but giving them instructions to capture Yang alive. Suo and Yao, apparently at An's instruction, however, killed Yang when they captured Hezhong. Thereafter, An had Feng Dao and Zhao Feng propose that Li Congke be punished for losing the circuit to a mutiny, but Emperor Mingzong rebuffed them, as he did An when An personally requested, citing how Li Congke had been his son ever since a young age. Still, he ordered Li Congke to stay at his own mansion and not be allowed to attend imperial gatherings. When Suo was subsequently made the military governor of Huguo, he, at An's direction, submitted weapons and claimed that those were weapons privately made by Li Congke, implying that Li Congke was planning a rebellion. However, Li Congke escaped further punishment at the intercession of Emperor Mingzong's favorite concubine, Consort Wang.

Around this time, the officers Li Xingde (李行德) and Zhang Jian (張儉) induced one Bian Yanwen (邊彥溫) to falsely accuse An of planning a rebellion and doing so by requesting the command of an army to attack Wu. The generals An Congjin and Yao, however, vouched for An Chonghui, so Emperor Mingzong executed Bian (and later, after discovering Li's and Zhang's parts in this false report, them as well).

By fall 930, Meng and Dong were preparing to rebel, but Dong made one last-ditch attempt to stop the imperial government from what he and Meng saw as provocative deployments—by having his son Dong Guangye (董光業), who served as the director of imperial gardens at the capital Luoyang, inform An Chonghui's deputy Li Qianhui (李虔徽) that if the imperial government sent more soldiers into the region, he would rebel. (However, as noted by, inter alia, the modern historian Bo Yang, Dong's threat had the exact opposite effect, since An's intent was to force Dong and Meng into rebellion so that he could destroy them.) When An thereafter, in fall 930, sent the officer Xun Xian'ai (荀咸乂) to reinforce Baoning's capital Lang Prefecture (閬州), Dong publicly declared his rebellion, and he and Meng joined their forces to prepare to attack Baoning, Wuxin, and Zhaowu (昭武, headquartered in modern Guangyuan, Sichuan) Circuits, which were loyal to the imperial government. When the news came, An advocated a general campaign against them, and Emperor Mingzong agreed.

By this point, however, due to An's lengthy hold on power, he had created many political enemies, and both Consort Wang and the eunuch Meng Hanqiong were repeatedly accusing An of faults. An, apprehensive of what might happen, offered to resign, which caused Emperor Mingzong further displeasure, believing that An was abandoning him. Still, he considered replacing An with Fan Yanguang, who, however, persuaded Emperor Mingzong that An needed to remain, as did Zhao, despite Feng's view that An could only protect himself by resigning. Subsequently, Emperor Mingzong made Fan a chief of staff as well, serving with An.

Emperor Mingzong sent his son-in-law, the general Shi Jingtang, to be in charge of the overall operations against Meng and Dong, but the imperial army ran into difficulties in advancing against Meng's and Dong's troops, while the garrisons of prefectures loyal to the imperial government were being captured one by one by Meng and Dong. In late 930, An offered to head to the frontline to oversee the campaign himself, and Emperor Mingzong agreed. It was said that when this was announced, the circuits which were previously not diligent in delivering the supplies to the army were all frightened and began to deliver supplies in haste. However, Shi himself did not support the campaign, and as soon as An left Luoyang, Shi began submitting petitions urging the end to the campaign.

Before An could actually reach the frontline, in spring 931, he stopped at Fengxiang Circuit (鳳翔, headquartered in modern Baoji, Shaanxi), whose military governor, Zhu Hongzhao, had received the post due to his relationship with An. When An reached Fengxiang, Zhu welcomed him with great fanfare, including bowing to An himself as An was arriving, and having his wife to come out to bow to An as well. At a feast held in An's honor by Zhu, An tearfully stated to Zhu, "The wicked people have continuously accused me, such that I have almost fallen. It is only by the clear understanding of the Sovereign that my family has been spared." As soon as An departed Fengxiang and continued to head to the frontline, however, Zhu twisted this statement in a report to Emperor Mingzong, accusing An of being resentful and possibly considering seizing Shi's command when he reached the frontline; he also wrote Shi, reporting the same thing. Shi, fearful, also submitted a report urging Emperor Mingzong to recall An. Emperor Mingzong therefore did. When An received the order and headed back toward Luoyang, Fengxiang refused him entry. Realizing the seriousness of the situation, An headed back toward Luoyang as quickly as he could. However, before he could reach there, Emperor Mingzong issued an edict making him the military governor of Huguo, thus preventing his return to Luoyang, despite Zhao's attempt at interceding for him.

=== After removal ===
After An Chonghui's removal as chief of staff, Emperor Mingzong summoned Li Congke to his presence and reunited with him. Emperor Mingzong also restored Qian Liu's offices, blaming the tension between the Later Tang imperial government and the Wuyue king on An.

By summer 931, An, who was fearful of what might happen next, requested complete retirement. Emperor Mingzong agreed and allowed him to retire with the honorary title of Taizi Taishi (太子太師). On the same day, An's sons An Chongzan (安重贊) and An Chongxu (安重緒), fearing of what might happen next, fled their imperial government posts and headed to Hezhong. Emperor Mingzong, apparently fearing that An might resist, commissioned his nephew Li Congzhang (李從璋) as the new military governor of Huguo, while sending Yao Yanchou with an army heading for Hezhong. When An Chongzan and An Chongxu arrived at Hezhong, An Chonghui put them under arrest and delivered them toward Luoyang, although when they reached Shan Prefecture (陝州, in modern Sanmenxia, Henan), by Emperor Mingzong's orders, they were imprisoned there and not taken to Luoyang.

Emperor Mingzong also sent the official Zhai Guangye (翟光鄴), who had long resented An, to Hezhong, to monitor the situation, stating to him, "If An Chonghui has wrongful intentions, then kill him." Once both Zhai and Li Congzhang reached Hezhong, Li Congzhang had An's mansion surrounded by soldiers, and then personally entered to see An. As he bowed to An, An, who was not expecting that, stepped down to him to pull him up. As An did, Li Congzhang pulled out a hammer and battered An's head with it, killing him. An's wife Lady Zhang, in shock, rushed there to try to save him. Li Congzhang also killed her with the hammer. Shortly after, Emperor Mingzong issued an edict, accusing An of the crimes of alienating Meng Zhixiang, Dong Zhang, and Qian from the imperial government, as well as planning to take command of an army in attacking Wu and summoning his two sons back to Huguo. The edict ordered his death as well as the deaths of An Chongzan and An Chongxu. Li Congzhang had the clothes stripped off the bodies of An and Lady Zhang and had them exposed for a day. It was only later at the urging of the officer Bai Congzhang (白從璋) that Li Congzhang allowed the bodies to be reclothed again. However, his other children were spared.
