= Doulu Ge =

Doulu Ge (Chinese: 豆盧革; died August 24, 927?) was an official of China's Former Jin and Later Tang dynasties. He served as a chancellor during the reigns of the Later Tang's first two emperors Li Cunxu (Emperor Zhuangzong) and Li Siyuan (Emperor Mingzong). As a chancellor commissioned by Li Cunxu, he did not fit in with the officials trusted by Li Siyuan, and was eventually exiled and forced to commit suicide.

== Background and service under Wang Chuzhi ==
It is not known where or when Doulu Ge was born. His family was from a prominent aristocratic line, but all that was recorded in historical accounts about his immediate ancestors were that both his grandfather Doulu Ji (豆盧籍) and father Doulu Zan (豆盧瓚) served as prefectural prefects — although the biography of the Tang chancellor Doulu Zhuan indicated that Doulu Zan was a younger brother of Doulu Zhuan's and thus Doulu Ge was a nephew to Doulu Zhuan. In Doulu Ge's youth, due to the late-Tang dynasty disturbances, he took refuge, successively, at Fu Prefecture (鄜州, in modern Yan'an, Shaanxi) and Yan Prefecture (延州, also in modern Yan'an), before ending up in Zhongshan (中山, in modern Baoding, Hebei). Wang Chuzhi, who was then the military governor of Yiwu Circuit (義武, headquartered at Zhongshan), treated him with respect and invited him to serve on staff, and it was said that he was good at writing and bookkeeping. Once, when at Wang's request, Doulu wrote an elegant poem about mulberry trees, and thereafter became more respected and promoted to be an assistant to Wang. However, it was said that he did not have upright behavior; for example, on one occasion, when he requested meeting Wang alone, Wang thought that Doulu had important suggestions to correct his governance, and came out of the mansion to personally welcome Doulu in. Instead, Doulu only had requests for military commissions for people he favored.

== Service under Li Cunxu ==
The historical records do not clearly indicate whether Doulu Ge continued to serve on staff of Wang's adoptive son Wang Du after Wang Du seized the circuit from Wang Chuzhi in 921. However, he was still described as assistant to the military governor of Yiwu as of 923, suggesting that he did. That year, Li Cunxu the Prince of Jin, to whom Wang Du was a vassal, was preparing to declare himself emperor of a new Later Tang, and was trying to find officials from Tang aristocratic families that he could make chancellors. He initially wanted to make an assistant to himself, Lu Zhi (盧質), chancellor, but Lu declined, recommending Doulu and Lu Cheng instead. Li thus summoned Doulu and Lu Cheng to his provisional imperial government and made them chancellors of the provisional government.

In summer 923, Li formally declared himself emperor of Later Tang at Xingtang (興唐, in modern Handan, Hebei). He gave both Doulu and Lu Cheng designations as Tong Zhongshu Menxia Pingzhangshi (同中書門下平章事), making them chancellors, and Doulu was also given the post of Menxia Shilang (門下侍郎, deputy head of the examination bureau of government (門下省, Menxia Sheng). It was said that both he and Lu Cheng were frivolous and lacked talent to serve as chancellors, but Li commissioned them on account of their aristocratic backgrounds and (in Lu's case) having long served on his staff. (Lu was removed later that year, leaving Doulu as the sole chancellor at that time.)

Subsequently, as Li was about to launch a surprise attack on archrival Later Liang's capital Daliang, he left Doulu, Li Shaohong, Zhang Xian (張憲), and Wang Zhengyan (王正言) in charge of defending Xingtang. After the attack was successful (causing Later Liang's emperor Zhu Zhen to commit suicide as the Later Tang forces approached, ending Later Liang), Li, after he entered Daliang and took over the Later Liang governmental structure, summoned Doulu to him to continue to serve as chancellor. It was said, though, that the actual governmental authorities were in the hands of Li's chief of staff Guo Chongtao (who was also given a chancellor designation), leaving Doulu with little to do. Further, it was said that in drafting regulations on governmental structure, Doulu, due to his lack of talent, was making many mistakes, requiring corrections by his subordinate Xiao Xifu (蕭希甫). Later, Guo recommended Zhao Guangyin to also be chancellor, and Doulu recommended Wei Yue to also be chancellor, so Li made both Zhao and Wei chancellors as well. Doulu himself was also given the post of director of salt and iron monopolies, as well as acting director of material pricing. He resigned the director of material pricing responsibilities in 924, after he was discovered by his deputy Kong Qian, who coveted the post, of an improper expenditure, as Kong then revealed it to Guo, who in turn informed him of the discovery. (Kong's design on the position was, for the time being, fruitless, however, as Guo recommended Zhang for the post instead, although, then, as Kong's urging, Doulu recommended Wang instead.)

Meanwhile, both Doulu and Wei developed poor reputations as chancellors, as Wei was said to be frivolous, and the people blamed Doulu for recommending him. Further, both Doulu and Wei commissioned their sons Doulu Sheng (豆盧升) and Wei Tao (韋濤) respectively, as governmental advisors serving below them, which was considered improper — and after this was exposed, they removed their sons from those posts but each other's sons to serve as imperial scholars in the imperial institutes that they oversaw — Doulu Ge was overseeing Hongwen Pavilion (弘文館) and Wei was overseeing Jianxian Institute (集賢院), respectively, further hurting their reputation, as this was considered an improper exchange of favors. Further, Doulu was said to be not interested in finding talented people to serve in the imperial administration, but spending his time on alchemy, seeking to extend his life. On one occasion, after he took some allegedly life-extending medications, he vomited blood for several days and nearly died before recovering. Trying to ingratiate Guo, he intimated to Guo that Guo might be a descendant of the great Tang general Guo Ziyi, leading Guo to arrogantly assert so from that point on.

== Service under Li Siyuan ==
In 926, Li Cunxu was killed in a mutiny at then-capital Luoyang. His adoptive brother Li Siyuan, who had previously rebelled against him, quickly arrived at Luoyang and took control of the city. Doulu Ge led the imperial officials in offering the throne to him, which Li Siyuan initially declined, but eventually accepted. Doulu and Wei Yue were initially retained as chancellors, although Li Siyuan also commissioned Zheng Jue and Ren Huan as chancellors, and the leading figure at court was Li Siyuan's chief of staff An Chonghui. Doulu was subsequently put in charge of the building of Li Cunxu's imperial tomb.

Doulu's and Wei's downfall, however, would come shortly after that. Doulu, after completing Li Cunxu's tomb, returned to his mansion and waited for the next assignment, as was traditional at the time for a director of an imperial tomb, and he expected to be removed from his chancellor position but made a circuit military governor. After several days, however, the next imperial commission did not come, and at the urging of his family members and friends, he went to the imperial court, implicitly pressing the issue. This offended An, who publicly humiliated Doulu by stating, "Your title of director of the imperial tomb is still present, but you do not wait for the new assignment before coming to the imperial court. Is it that you believe that we, as people from a border region, can easily be deceived?" (Both Li Siyuan and An were non-Han Chinese.) Doulu and Wei were also being perceived poorly publicly for several different reasons — they were considered to be disrespectful to the emperor while reporting to him; while other imperial officials at that time were taking a reduced amount of their salaries, Doulu and his sons were receiving full pay; and while the other imperial officials backpay were being calculated from the day of Li Siyuan's ascension, Doulu and Wei were still calculating their own from during the time of Li Cunxu's reign. Meanwhile, Xiao Xifu had long resented Doulu and Wei for having rejected his earlier proposed promotion to Jianyi Daifu (諫議大夫), and therefore decided to take vengeance. He submitted a petition in which he not only accused Doulu and Wei of flattery and faithlessness to Li Cunxu, but further falsely accused Doulu of seizing people's farms and allowing his farmer tenants to kill others, and Wei of seizing a neighbor's well in order to steal the treasures that the neighbor's ancestors had hidden in the well. Upon receiving Xiao's petition, Li Siyuan exiled Doulu and Wei — in Doulu's case, to be the prefect of Chen Prefecture (辰州, in modern Huaihua, Hunan), then as census officer of Fei Prefecture (費州, in modern Tongren, Guizhou), and then completely stripped of official positions and exiled to Ling Prefecture (陵州, in modern Meishan, Sichuan).

In 927, during the Later Tang imperial government's campaign against the rebel warlord Gao Jixing (whose domain would become the de facto independent state of Jingnan), Li Siyuan issued an edict blaming Wei (who was friendly with Gao) and Doulu of, at the time that Li Cunxu conquered Former Shu in 925, allowing Gao to absorb three prefectures previously belonging to Former Shu into his territory, and he ordered them to commit suicide. Their family members were exiled.
