= Wei Yue =

Wei Yue (韋說) (died August 24, 927?) was an official of the Chinese Tang dynasty, and Tang's successor states Later Liang and Later Tang of the Five Dynasties and Ten Kingdoms period, serving as a chancellor during the reigns of Later Tang's first two emperors Li Cunxu and Li Siyuan. As a chancellor commissioned by Li Cunxu, he did not fit in with the officials trusted by Li Siyuan, and was eventually exiled and forced to commit suicide.

== Background and service during Tang and Later Liang ==
Part of the text of the History of the Five Dynasties biography of Wei Yue's was lost, but indicated that Wei's father was Wei Xiu (韋岫), who served as a governor of Fujian Circuit (福建, headquartered in modern Fuzhou, Fujian)—which would make Wei Yue a nephew of the prominent late-Tang military governor (jiedushi) Wei Zhou (韋宙) and a distant descendant of the great Northern Zhou general Wei Xiaokuan. However, because of the text's being lost, not much is known about Wei Yue's own early career, although in the biography of his later chancellor colleague Doulu Ge in the New History of the Five Dynasties, it was said that at one point in the very late Tang times, Wei served as an imperial censor with the title Dianzhong Shi Yushi (殿中侍御史), but was, for an unspecified fault, exiled to Guang Prefecture (廣州, in modern Guangzhou, Guangdong). Later, after a general pardon was declared—unclear whether this would be in the very last days of Tang or early in its successor state Later Liang—Wei was able to leave his place of exile, and he took up residence at Jiangling, where he became friendly with the military governor of the region (Jingnan Circuit), Gao Jichang. He was later made the deputy minister of rites (禮部侍郎, Libu Shilang) during Later Liang.

== During Li Cunxu's reign ==
In 923, Later Liang was conquered by its archrival to the north, Later Tang. Later Tang's emperor Li Cunxu, who considered himself the legitimate successor to Tang, took over Later Liang's territory. At that time, he had only commissioned two chancellors, his chief of staff Guo Chongtao and Doulu Ge, neither of whom was familiar with Tang regulations. The popular opinion at that time was that he needed to commission some additional chancellors who were familiar with Tang regulations. Guo recommended Zhao Guangyin, while Doulu recommended Wei. Li Cunxu thus commissioned both Zhao and Wei as chancellors with the designation Tong Zhongshu Menxia Pingzhangshi (同中書門下平章事), and also gave both the title Zhongshu Shilang (中書侍郎, the deputy head of the legislative bureau of government (中書省, Zhongshu Sheng)).

Wei's and Doulu's biographies in the History of the Five Dynasties gave two different (although not necessarily contradictory) portrayals of Wei as chancellor. Wei's own biography portrayed him as being careful and, as a result, not assuming much actual responsibility as chancellor, leaving the matters of state to Guo. Doulu's biography, however, stated that Wei was frivolous and associating with inappropriate people, causing the resentment of the people to fall on Doulu for having recommended him. Doulu's biography also indicated that both Doulu and Wei commissioned their sons Doulu Sheng (豆盧升) and Wei Tao (韋濤) respectively, as governmental advisors serving below them, which was considered improper—and after this was exposed, they removed their sons from those posts but each other's sons to serve as imperial scholars in the imperial institutes that they oversaw—Doulu Ge was overseeing Hongwen Pavilion (弘文館) and Wei was overseeing Jianxian Institute (集賢院), respectively, further hurting their reputation, as this was considered an improper exchange of favors.

As Later Tang considered itself Tang's legitimate successor, it accepted Tang-issued official commission certificates as its own for purposes of determining eligibility for offices. This, combined with the late-Tang wars that eventually extended into Later Liang's wars with Later Tang's predecessor state Jin that led to the destruction and loss of records, caused many people who wanted official positions to forge them, including altering their family members' commission certificates to appear to be their own. In 924, at Guo's instigation, a major reform was carried out where some 90% of the certificates were deemed forged and cancelled, leading to much anger and grief among the prospective officials. The popular opinion at the time was that while forgery was common, Guo's reforms were too harsh for the troubled times that Later Tang was in at that time, but it was said that Wei did not dare to cross Guo and therefore spoke nothing about it. When one of his associates tried to persuade him to speak up, he stated, "This was the will of the Guo man." Not until Guo was wrongfully killed in 926 did Wei submit a petition to Li Cunxu seeking partial reversal of Guo's policy, and in his petition, he defamed Guo greatly—which, rather than repairing his own reputation, damaged it further.

== During Li Siyuan's reign ==
Not long after Guo Chongtao's death, Li Cunxu himself was killed in a mutiny at the capital Luoyang. One of the generals who had previously rebelled against him, his adoptive brother Li Siyuan, quickly arrived at Luoyang and claimed imperial title. Li Siyuan retained Doulu Ge and Wei Yue as his own chancellors, while also commissioning Ren Huan and his chief of staff An Chonghui as chancellors as well. Fearing for his safety in the new administration, Wei often begged Ren to protect him, and for a while, Ren did.

Doulu's and Wei's downfall, however, would come shortly after that. They were being perceived poorly publicly for several different reasons—they were considered to be disrespectful to the emperor while reporting to him; Wei had commissioned a grandson as an official by treating the grandson as his son; Wei had received bribes from an official, Wang Can (王傪), and commissioned Wang to an office near Luoyang; and while the other imperial officials backpay were being calculated from the day of Li Siyuan's ascension, Doulu and Wei were still calculating their own from during the time of Li Cunxu's reign. Meanwhile, the official Xiao Xifu (蕭希甫) had long resented Doulu and Wei for having rejected his earlier proposed promotion to Jianyi Daifu (諫議大夫), and therefore decided to take vengeance. He submitted a petition in which he not only accused Doulu and Wei of flattery and faithlessness to Li Cunxu, but further falsely accused Doulu of seizing people's farms and allowing his farmer tenants to kill others, and Wei of seizing a neighbor's well in order to steal the treasures that the neighbor's ancestors had hidden in the well. Upon receiving Xiao's petition, Li Siyuan exiled Doulu and Wei—in Wei's case, to be the prefect of Xu Prefecture (漵州, in modern Huaihua, Hunan), then as census officer of Yi Prefecture (夷州, in modern Zunyi, Guizhou), and then completely stripped of official positions and exiled to He Prefecture (合州, in modern Chongqing).

In 927, during the Later Tang imperial government's campaign against Gao Jixing (i.e., Gao Jichang, who changed his name to observe naming taboo for Li Cunxu's grandfather Li Guochang, and whose domain would become the de facto independent state of Jingnan), Li Siyuan issued an edict blaming Wei (who was friendly with Gao) and Doulu of, at the time that Li Cunxu conquered Former Shu in 925, allowing Gao to absorb three prefectures previously belonging to Former Shu into his territory, and he ordered them to commit suicide. Their family members were exiled.

== Notes and references ==
- History of the Five Dynasties, vol. 67.
- Zizhi Tongjian, vols. 272, 275, 276.
