= Dongwang =

Dongwang may refer to the following locations in China:

- Dongwang, Dingzhou (东旺镇), town in Hebei
- Dongwang, Ningjin County, Hebei (东汪镇), town
- Dongwang, Xingtai County (东汪镇), town in Hebei
- Dongwang, Xinle (东王镇), Hebei
- Dongwang Township, Hebei (东旺乡), in Quyang County
- Dongwang Township, Yunnan (东旺乡), in Shangri-La County
