= Wang Chuzhi =

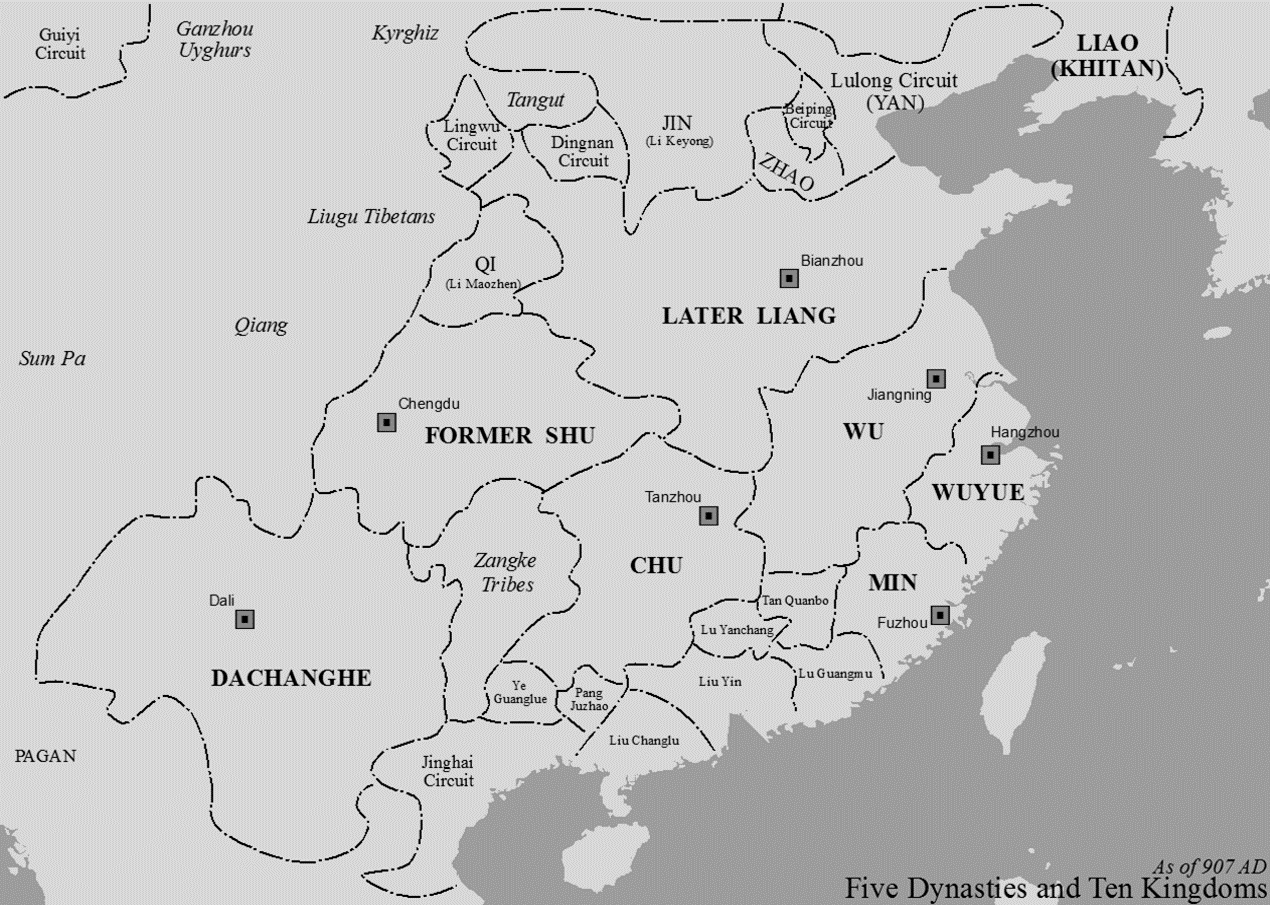
- A map of China during the Later Liang, with Wang Chuzhi's Yiwu shown as "Beiping"
- Traditional Chinese: 王處直
- Simplified Chinese: 王处直
Transcriptions
Standard Mandarin
- Hanyu Pinyin: Wáng Chùzhí
- Wade–Giles: Wang Ch'u-chih

Wang Yunming
- Chinese: 王允明
Transcriptions
Standard Mandarin
- Hanyu Pinyin: Wáng Yǔnmíng
- Wade–Giles: Wang Yün-ming

Prince of Beiping
- Chinese: 北平王
- Literal meaning: King of the Northern Pacified [Area]
Transcriptions
Standard Mandarin
- Hanyu Pinyin: Běipíng Wáng
- Wade–Giles: Pei-p'ing Wang

Wang Chuzhi (862 – 6 February 923), who held the courtesy name Yunming and was created Prince of Beiping, was a Chinese warlord who controlled Yiwu around modern Baoding, Hebei, during the late Tang and early Five Dynasties and Ten Kingdoms Periods of Chinese history. He served as Yiwu's military governor (jiedushi) from 900, when replaced the previous governor, his nephew Wang Gao, who fled during an attack. The military governors of the era were often de facto rulers independent of imperial control; Wang Chuzhi became independent de jure as well in 910 when he and the neighboring warlord Wang Rong, prince of Zhao, broke away from the Later Liang. Wang Chuzhi was finally overthrown in 921 by his adoptive son Wang Du.

== Life ==
=== Early years ===
Wang Chuzhi was born in 862, during the reign of Emperor Yizong of Tang. His family was from the Tang dynasty capital Chang'an, and his ancestors had served as officers in the imperial Shence Armies for generations. His uncle Wang Zong (王宗) was not only a highly ranked general in the Shence Armies but was also a skillful merchant. It was said that Wang Zong became so rich that he was able to be extravagant in his food and to have thousands of servants. Wang Chuzhi presumably followed his elder cousin Wang Chucun son of Wang Zong to Yiwu Province when Wang Chucun was made Yiwu's military governor in 879 by Emperor Yizong's son and successor Emperor Xizong and became a military officer there.

It was said that Wang Chuzhi favored sorcery, and he became friendly with the sorcerer Li Yingzhi (李應之). Li Yingzhi himself had obtained a boy named Liu Yunlang from Xingyi (陘邑, in modern Shijiazhuang, Hebei) and adopted the boy as his own son, but seeing how Wang Chuzhi did not himself have son at that point, he gave the boy to Wang Chuzhi, stating, "this boy has a honored appearance." Wang Chuzhi adopted the boy and changed his name to Wang Du. While Wang Chuzhi later had a son named Wang Yu (王郁) by a concubine (not his wife), he did not favor Wang Yu, and instead favored Wang Du.

By 900, Wang Chuzhi was serving as an officer under Wang Chucun's son and successor Wang Gao, when Yiwu came under the attack of Zhang Cunjing (張存敬), a general under the major warlord Zhu Quanzhong the military governor of Xuanwu (宣武, headquartered in modern Kaifeng, Henan). Wang Gao put Wang Chuzhi in command of the Yiwu army to resist Zhang's attack. However, he did not listen to Wang Chuzhi's counsel of not engaging the Xuanwu forces immediately, but rather wearing out the Xuanwu forces before actually engaging them. Rather, he listened to the secretary Liang Wen (梁汶), who advocated an immediate engagement against the Xuanwu troops, and therefore ordered Wang Chuzhi to carry out that plan. Zhang defeated Wang Chuzhi and inflicted heavy casualties. Wang Chuzhi barely escaped back to Yiwu's capital Dingzhou. Wang Gao panicked and fled to the territory of Yiwu's ally Li Keyong the military governor of Hedong (河東, headquartered in modern Taiyuan, Shanxi). (Already upset over how his father did not love him, Wang Yu accompanied Wang Gao on this flight, and subsequently married Li Keyong's daughter.) The Yiwu soldiers supported Wang Chuzhi to take over the province. He subsequently negotiated a peace with Zhu, promising to submit to Zhu from this point on and no longer be allied with Li Keyong and also giving Zhu a tribute of silk. Zhu thus withdrew, and at his request Wang Chuzhi was commissioned by then-reigning Emperor Zhaozong (Emperor Xizong's brother and successor) as the new military governor of Yiwu.

=== Governor under the Tang ===
In 901, Zhu Quanzhong launched a major five-pronged attack on Li Keyong, intending to finally capture Hedong's capital Taiyuan Municipality. As Zhu's ally, Wang Chuzhi commanded the Yiwu troops that served as one of the five prongs of the attack. Zhu's and his allies's forces put Taiyuan under siege but were eventually forced to withdraw due to rains and illnesses. In 904, Emperor Zhaozong, who by that point was under Zhu's physical control, gave Wang the title of Taibao (太保, one of the Three Excellencies) and created him the Prince of Taiyuan.

=== Governor under the Later Liang ===
In 907, Zhu Quanzhong had Emperor Zhaozong's son and successor Emperor Ai yield the throne to him, ending the Tang dynasty and starting the new Later Liang. Posthumously known as Emperor Taizu, Zhu bestowed the honorary chancellor title of Shizhong (侍中) on Wang Chuzhi and created him Prince of Beiping.

After the establishment of the new dynasty, Wang Chuzhi's Yiwu and neighboring Wushun (武順) around modern Shijiazhuang, Hebei, governed by Wang Rong, prince of Zhao, continued to refuse to submit taxes to the imperial government but often offered tributes to Zhu. Despite this, however, the emperor believed that they would eventually turn against him and therefore decided to place their lands under his direct control. In 910, he had his attendants Du Tingyin (杜廷隱) and Ding Yanhui (丁延徽) seize control of Wushun's Shen (深州) and Ji (冀州) prefectures, both in modern Hengshui, Hebei, by trick. He then prepared to have his general Wang Jingren attack Wushun's capital Zhenzhou.

=== Independent rule ===
In response, Wang Rong broke away from Later Liang, effectively becoming the ruler of an independent Zhao state while changing the name of his territory from Wushun back to its Tang name of Chengde. He sought emergency aid from Li Keyong's son and successor Li Cunxu, the Prince of Jin, and Liu Shouguang, the military governor of Lulong (盧龍, headquartered in modern Beijing) and honorary Prince of Yan. Knowing that Yiwu would be the next target if Zhao fell, Wang Chuzhi also sent an emissary to Taiyuan, offering to support Li Cunxu as the common leader. Liu refused to render help, but Li Cunxu responded, first sending a detachment under his general Zhou Dewei and then leading the main Jin army himself to aid Wang Rong. During the subsequent campaign between combined Jin/Zhao forces and Later Liang forces, Wang Chuzhi also contributed an army to fight on the Jin/Zhao side, and together, they crushed the Later Liang forces under Wang Jingren in spring 911. From this point, Chengde and Yiwu were Jin allies, and resumed the use of the Tang dynasty era name Tianyou (as Jin and its allies ostensibly sought the reestablishment of Tang). After Wang Jingren fled, Li Cunxu gave chase, going as far as briefly putting Wei Prefecture (魏州, in modern Handan, Hebei) under siege, but, concerned that Liu would attack him from the rear, withdrew and returned to Zhao.

Subsequently, Liu, hearing of Later Liang's defeat, was considering claiming imperial title himself. He sent messengers to Wang Rong and Wang Chuzhi, suggesting that they should honor him as Shangfu (尚父, meaning "imperial father," a highly honorary title that was rarely bestowed and only on highly honored senior officials). When Wang Rong informed this to Li Cunxu, Li Cunxu, pursuant to suggestions that his generals made that making Liu more arrogant would cause him to push himself into doom, signed a joint declaration with Wang Rong, Wang Chuzhi, as well as three other military governors under Li Cunxu (Li Cunxu's cousin Li Sizhao, Zhou, and Song Yao (宋瑤)) honoring Liu as Shangfu. Faced with this, the Later Liang emperor tried to keep Liu at least nominally a vassal by offering him the title of Caifangshi (采訪使). Liu thereafter nevertheless declared himself the Emperor of Yan.

In winter 911, Liu attacked Yiwu. Wang Chuzhi sought aid from Jin. Li Cunxu sent Zhou to rendezvous with the Zhao officer Wang Deming (Wang Rong's adoptive son) and the Yiwu officer Cheng Yan (程巖), to attack Yan. By late 912, with Li Cunxu himself also sieging Yan's capital You Prefecture (幽州), the city fell. Liu fled but was captured in spring 913, ending Yan. Li Cunxu took Liu and his father Liu Rengong (whom Liu Shouguang had overthrown and replaced) captive, and was set to return to Taiyuan with them, when both Wang Chuzhi and Wang Rong requested that he took his victory march through Yiwu and Chengde. Li Cunxu agreed, and when he visited Yiwu, Wang Chuzhi and he went to worship at the temple of Mount Heng together. (After the victory tour, Li Cunxu took Liu Shouguang and Liu Rengong back to Taiyuan and executed them.) Thereafter, Wang Chuzhi and Wang Rong submitted a joint petition offering the title of Shangshu Ling (尚書令)—which no Tang official had dared to use since the early Tang emperor Emperor Taizong carried that title while he was still the Prince of Qin under his father Emperor Gaozu)—to Li Cunxu. Li Cunxu accepted, and thereafter began to organize a provisional government under Emperor Taizong's precedent.

In 918, Li Cunxu, who had taken Tianxiong (天雄, headquartered at Wei Prefecture) at that point, prepared a major operation intending to capture Later Liang's capital Daliang. Wang Chuzhi sent some 10,000 soldiers to contribute to Li Cunxu's campaign, which, however, ended with a mutually destructive battle at Huliu Slope (胡柳陂, in modern Heze, Shandong), with both Jin and Later Liang forces suffering two-thirds casualties and Jin forces forced to withdraw.

=== Overthrow and death ===
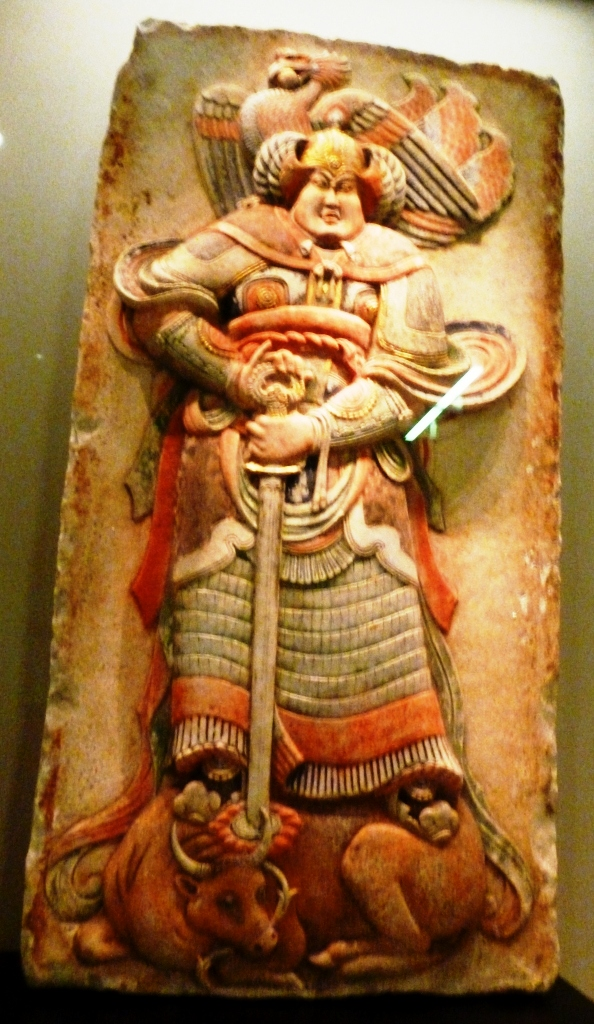
Stone relief from the tomb of Wang Chuzhi, rediscovered in 1980, looted in 1994, and excavated in 1995

In 921, Wang Rong was killed in a mutiny, and the mutineers supported Wang Deming to take over Chengde. Wang Deming accepted and changed his name back to his birth name of Zhang Wenli. Li Cunxu, after initially pretending to accept Zhang's offer of allegiance, declared a general campaign against Zhang to avenge Wang Rong. Wang Chuzhi, however, had misgivings, believing that if Li Cunxu took direct control of Chengde, Yiwu would be taken over as well, and therefore suggested to Li Cunxu that he accept Zhang's submission. Li Cunxu refused.

Concerned, Wang Chuzhi contacted his son Wang Yu—who was then serving as the military prefect (團練使, Tuanlianshi) of Xin Prefecture (新州, in modern Zhangjiakou, Hebei) under Li Cunxu. He requested that Wang Yu secretly instigate an incursion by Khitan's Emperor Taizu. Wang Yu agreed, but also requested to be made his heir and Wang Chuzhi agreed.

However, most of Wang Chuzhi's staff members were apprehensive about inducing a Khitan incursion. Further, Wang Du, who was then Wang Chuzhi's deputy military governor and who was considered his heir, was fearful of being displaced by Wang Yu. Wang Du and the secretary He Zhaoxun (和昭訓) therefore plotted to arrest Wang Chuzhi. They acted after a feast that Wang Chuzhi held for Zhang's emissary to Yiwu, seizing Wang Chuzhi and put him and his wife and concubines under house arrest. Wang Du thereafter slaughtered all of Wang Chuzhi's male biological descendants in Dingzhou, as well as Wang Chuzhi's close associates. He claimed the title of acting military governor and reported what occurred to Li Cunxu. Li Cunxu thereafter approved of his takeover from Wang Chuzhi. (Wang Chuzhi's younger son Wang Wei (王威) did escape and flee to Khitan territory, and Wang Wei would subsequently serve under Khitan's Emperor Taizu and his son Emperor Taizong.)

In spring 923, Wang Du visited Wang Chuzhi at his mansion, apparently trying to maintain a pretense of father-son relationship. Wang Chuzhi, though unarmed, hit his chest with a fist and tried to bite off his nose, stating, "Rebellious bandit! When did I ever mistreat you?" Wang Du barely escaped from Wang Chuzhi's grasp. Shortly after on February 6th, Wang Chuzhi either died in anger or was killed by Wang Du.

== Family ==
- Father
  - Wang Zong (王宗)
- Children
  - Wang Yu (王郁)
  - Wang Wei (王威)
  - Wang Du (王都), adopted, born Liu Yunlang (劉雲郎)

== See also ==
- Tomb of Wang Chuzhi

Chinese nobility
New creation	Prince of Beiping; 907–921	Title not inherited
Preceded by Zhu Wen	Ruler of China (Baoding region) (de jure); 910–921	Succeeded by Li Cunxu (Prince of JIn)
Preceded by Wang Gao	Ruler of China (Baoding region) (de facto); 900–921	Succeeded by Wang Du
