= Wang Du =

- Chinese: 王都
Transcriptions
Standard Mandarin
- Hanyu Pinyin: Wáng Dū
- Wade–Giles: Wang Tu

Liu Yunlang
- Traditional Chinese: 劉雲郎
- Simplified Chinese: 刘云郎
Transcriptions
Standard Mandarin
- Hanyu Pinyin: Liú Yúnláng
- Wade–Giles: Liu Yün-lang

Wang Du (died 26 March 929), born Liu Yunlang, was a Chinese warlord during the early Five Dynasties and Ten Kingdoms period who ruled as the military governor (jiedushi) of Yiwu around modern Dingzhou in Hebei. He seized control of Yiwu from his adoptive father Wang Chuzhi in a coup and subsequently ruled it semi-independently as a vassal of Jin and Jin's successor state Later Tang. In 928, the Later Tang emperor Mingzong, believing that Wang was about to openly rebel, ordered a general campaign against him and, after a lengthy siege, Wang killed himself and his family by self-immolation as his capital was falling.

== Background ==
It is not known exactly when Wang Du was born—although subsequent events cast a timeframe as to when his birth might have been, and it was clearly late in the Tang dynasty. He was initially born in a household in Xingyi (陘邑, in modern Shijiazhuang, Hebei), with the name of Liu Yunlang. At one point, he was taken by the sorcerer Li Yingzhi (李應之) and raised by Li as his child. At one point, Li became acquainted with Wang Chuzhi—although it is not known whether Wang Chuzhi was then still an officer under his brother Wang Chucun or Wang Chucun's son and successor Wang Gao, or whether he was already military governor after succeeding Wang Gao—and healed Wang Chuzhi of an illness. As a result, Wang Chuzhi believed that Li had supernatural powers and came to trust him. At that time, Wang Chuzhi did not yet have a son, and Li gave Liu Yunlang to him to be his child, stating to him, "This boy has an honored appearance." Wang agreed to take the boy as a son, renaming him Wang Du.

Due to Wang Chuzhi's trust in Li, apparently after he became military governor in 900, he entrusted many military decisions to Li, causing resentment among his officers. There was a time when an army of neighboring Lulong (盧龍, headquartered in modern Beijing) was passing through Yiwu, and Wang, concerned that Lulong forces might launch a surprise attack, mobilized his troops to prepare. The officers took this chance to surround his mansion and kill Li. They then also tried to force Wang to kill Wang Du as well. Wang Chuzhi insisted on not doing so, and the officers relented. The next day, Wang Chuzhi held a feast for them to comfort them, but secretly recorded the names of all who attended. Over the next 20 years, he gradually found excuses to kill them one by one. (Note: Wang Chuzhi's and Wang Du's biographies in the New History of the Five Dynasties specifically referred to this incident as during a time that Li Kuangchou was the military governor of Lulong and, apparently after his defeat by Li Keyong, was trying to flee to the Tang dynasty capital Chang'an, but that would have placed the incident in 894, long before Wang Chuzhi became military governor.)

Wang Chuzhi did have biological sons later, but he did not favor them, instead favoring Wang Du, who as he grew, was good at flattering his father and treachery. He established a new army and put Wang Du in charge of it. Among Wang Chuzhi's biological sons, apparently the oldest one was Wang Yu (王郁), born of a concubine. Unhappy that Wang Chuzhi did not favor him, he fled to Li Keyong the military governor of Hedong (河東, headquartered in modern Taiyuan, Shanxi), and Li Keyong gave him a daughter in marriage, eventually promoting him to be the military prefect (團練使, Tuanlianshi) of Xin Prefecture (新州, in modern Zhangjiakou, Hebei). As all of Wang Chuzhi's other sons were young, Wang Chuzhi made Wang Du the deputy military governor, and planned to pass the military governor office to him.

As of 921, Tang had long fallen, and Wang Chuzhi's Yiwu was aligned with Li Keyong's son and successor Li Cunxu the Prince of Jin in a long-term war with Tang's successor state Later Liang. That year, another ally of theirs, Wang Rong the Prince of Zhao or Chengde (成德, headquartered in modern Shijiazhuang)), was killed in a coup by his adoptive son Zhang Wenli (known as Wang Deming while Wang Rong's adoptive son), and Li declared a general campaign against Zhang. Wang Chuzhi, believing that over the late Tang decades, Yiwu and Chengde had been geographically reliant on each other for defense, and that if Li took control of Chengde directly, Yiwu would be isolated, opposed the campaign. Li, however, sent a response stating that because of Zhang's great crimes, he could not be spared. Wang, apprehensive of the consequences, decided to secretly contact Wang Yu, asking him to entice Khitan Empire's Emperor Taizu to invade, to divert Jin troops. Wang Yu agreed, but extracted a promise from Wang Chuzhi that he, not Wang Du, would become Wang Chuzhi's heir.

The officers at Wang Chuzhi's own headquarters, however, did not want to invite Khitan troops, and Wang Du was also concerned that Wang Yu would take over his position. He thus secretly plotted with his secretary He Zhaoxun (和昭訓) to seize Wang Chuzhi. They took an opportunity to act when Wang Chuzhi welcomed Zhang's emissary to Yiwu and feasted with the emissary. As Wang Chuzhi was returning to headquarters after the feast, Wang Du had several hundred new army soldiers hidden around the mansion, and seized Wang Chuzhi. He put Wang Chuzhi under house arrest at his western mansion, and slaughtered Wang Chuzhi's male descendants and close associates. He declared himself acting military governor and reported what happened to Li Cunxu. Li Cunxu officially sanctioned him as acting military governor. (Only Wang Chuzhi's young son Wang Wei (王威) escaped the slaughter and fled to Khitan.)

== As military governor ==
=== Under Jin ===
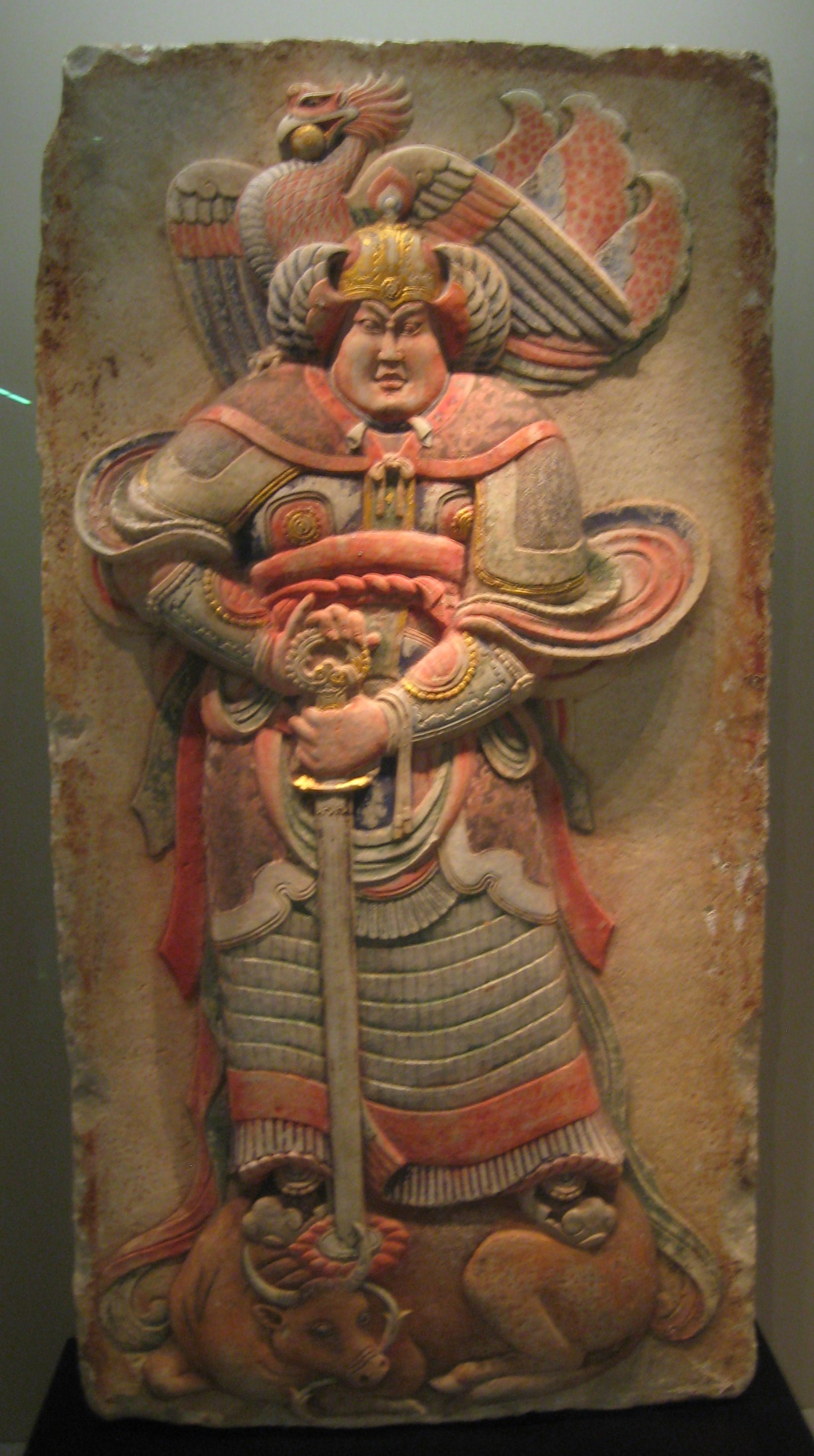
A relief of a Chinese warrior in armor from the Tomb of Wang Chuzhi

Shortly after, Li Cunxu put Chengde's capital Zhenzhou under siege. Wang Yu persuaded Liao's Emperor Taizu to aid the Chengde rebels, and Emperor Taizu agreed. In winter 921, he marched through Lulong, and then attacked Yiwu's capital Dingzhou. Wang Du sought emergency aid from Li. Li headed for Dingzhou to aid Wang Du.

Meanwhile, in the spring of 923, while under attack, Wang Du went to visit Wang Chuzhi at his western mansion, apparently trying to maintain a resemblance of a father-son relationship. Wang Chuzhi, however, swung his fists at Wang Du's chest, cursing, "Rebellious bandit! When did I ever mistreat you?" As he was unarmed, he also tried to bite at Wang Du's nose. Wang Du barely escaped from Wang Chuzhi's grasp. Shortly after, Wang Chuzhi either died in anger or was killed by Wang Du on February 6th. He received a fairly elaborate tomb, rediscovered in 1980 and prized for its depiction of the elite music of the era.

As Li's relief force approached Dingzhou, Emperor Taizu advanced to Xinle (新樂, in modern Shijiazhuang) to confront him. At a battle there, however, he was defeated by Li and forced to withdraw, lifting the siege on Dingzhou in the process. Wang Du went out of the city to personally welcome Li, and held a feast for him. He also asked to give his teenage daughter in marriage to Li's son Li Jiji, which Li Cunxu agreed to. After this meeting, it was said that Li treated him well, and whatever requests he made were approved.

=== Under Emperor Zhuangzong ===
In 923, Li Cunxu declared himself the emperor of a new Later Tang (as Emperor Zhuangzong), claiming to be the legitimate successor to Tang. He soon destroyed Later Liang and took over its territory. Wang Du continued to serve Emperor Zhuangzong. During Emperor Zhuangzong's reign, Wang continued to act as a semi-independent warlord, commissioning the prefects for the two subordinate prefectures—Qi (祁州) and Yi, both in modern Baoding—by himself, not submitting census counts to the imperial government, and keeping the tax revenues for his own army without submitting them to the imperial government. In 925, when Emperor Zhuangzong visited Yedu (鄴都, in modern Handan, Hebei), Wang went to Yedu to pay homage to him, and Emperor Zhuangzong held grand feasts in his honor. (It was for the purpose of opening a polo field for Emperor Zhuangzong to welcome Wang at that Emperor Zhuangzong destroyed an altar that he had initially received the imperial title in 923—an act that the deputy defender of Yedu, Zhang Xian (張憲), considered a sign of misfortune since it showed a lack of gratitude for the Mandate of Heaven.)

=== Under Emperor Mingzong ===
In 926, Emperor Zhuangzong was killed in a mutiny at his capital Luoyang. Soon, his adoptive brother, the general Li Siyuan, who had led a separate mutiny, arrived at Luoyang and claimed the imperial title (posthumously commemorated as Emperor Mingzong). Emperor Mingzong bestowed the honorary chancellor title of Zhongshu Ling (中書令) on Wang Du, but was said to despise Wang because of what Wang had done to his father. Another source of the friction between the imperial government and Yiwu developed over the fact that Emperor Mingzong's chief of staff An Chonghui wanted to show imperial strength and was not as willing to allow Yiwu to retain its revenues. Further, due to the incessant Khitan attacks, the Later Tang imperial government was often sending armies to the region of Lulong and Yiwu, and Wang feared that they actually intended to attack him. Both sides became suspicious of each other.

Wang became apprehensive that Emperor Mingzong might try to move him from Yiwu to another region and therefore consulted He Zhaoxun; He Zhaoxun suggested finding ways to alienate other military governors so that he could protect himself. Wang therefore tried a number of ways to ally with other military governors—including trying to enter a marriage alliance with Zhao Dejun the military governor of Lulong; asking to become blood brothers with Wang Jianli the military governor of Chengde, who had an enmity with An; sending secret letters encased in wax to the military governors of Pinglu (平盧, headquartered in modern Weifang, Shandong) (Huo Yanwei), Zhongwu (忠武, headquartered in modern Xuchang, Henan) (Fang Zhiwen (房知溫)), Zhaoyi (昭義, headquartered in modern Changzhi, Shanxi) (Mao Zhang (毛璋)), Xichuan (西川, headquartered in modern Chengdu, Sichuan) (Meng Zhixiang), and Dongchuan (東川, headquartered in modern Mianyang, Sichuan) (Dong Zhang), trying to alienate them from the imperial government; and trying to entice the general Wang Yanqiu the military governor of Guide Circuit (歸德, headquartered in modern Shangqiu, Henan), who was then commanding the imperial defense against Khitan incursions. When Wang Yanqiu refused his overtures, he tried to bribe Wang Yanqiu's subordinates into assassinating Wang Yanqiu. The attempt failed, and Wang Yanqiu reported this to Emperor Mingzong, accusing Wang Du of rebellion.

In summer 928, Emperor Mingzong ordered a general campaign against Wang Du, putting Wang Yanqiu in overall command of the operations, assisted by An Shentong (安審通) and Zhang Qianzhao (張虔昭). Wang Yanqiu quickly advanced to Dingzhou and put it under siege, but the Khitan general, the Xi chieftain Tunei (禿餒) quickly arrived to aid Wang Du. They attacked Wang Yanqiu, but Wang Yanqiu repelled their attack, forcing them to withdraw within the Dingzhou city walls. Wang Yanqiu then captured Dingzhou's western city. However, the main city's walls were secure and difficult to attack, so Wang Yanqiu relaxed his attack, while building a temporary Yiwu headquarters (as Emperor Mingzong put him temporarily in charge of Yiwu), collecting the taxes from the three prefectures of Ding, Qi, and Yi to supply his troops.

Shortly after, another Khitan army arrived, and Wang Yanqiu and Zhang Yanlang withdrew some distance away from Dingzhou. Wang Du and Tunei took the opportunity to chase them to Quyang (曲陽, in modern Baoding), but fell into a trap laid by Wang Yanqiu and were defeated with heavy casualties, forcing them to flee back to Dingzhou. Wang Yanqiu also defeated another subsequent wave of Khitan reinforcements, and then put Dingzhou under siege again. With Khitan forces discouraged by their defeat at Wang Yanqiu's hands, Dingzhou's situation became difficult. As a desperate measure, Wang welcomed one Li Jitao (李繼陶)—a commoner boy that Emperor Zhuangzong had taken on one of his campaigns and adopted as his own son, but whom Emperor Mingzong had sent out of the palace when he took the throne—to Dingzhou, and had him put on the emperor's yellow robe and sit on the city wall, stating to Wang Yanqiu, "This is the son of Emperor Zhuangzong, who is now to be emperor. You, Lord, had received the graces from the deceased emperor. How can you not think of him?" Wang Yanqiu, however, pointed out that this was a useless trick, and did not relent on his attack.

However, Wang Du was, for months, effective at holding Dingzhou's defenses. He also kept close watch on his officers, and any officer who were about to defect to the imperial forces would be killed. Emperor Mingzong sent messengers to push Wang Yanqiu into attacking more directly, but Wang Yanqiu showed the secureness of the defenses to the imperial messengers, and insisted that it was better to keep the city under siege and then wait for it to collapse on its own. Emperor Mingzong agreed. In spring 929, Wang Du and Tunei tried to fight their way out of the siege, but could not. Shortly after, Wang Du's officer Ma Rangneng (馬讓能) opened up the city gates to let the imperial forces in. Wang Du and his family committed suicide by fire. Wang Du had maintained an extensive collection of books, which he collected by sending messengers to buy up rare books at the time that Zhang Wenli's son Zhang Chujin was defeated at Chengde, and when Later Liang was conquered. In his suicide, the book collection was also destroyed. Four of his sons and one of his brothers (presumably from the Liu line) were captured (along with Tunei) and presented to Emperor Mingzong.
