= Xizhong =

Xizhong may refer to:

- Xizhong Township (simplified Chinese: 息仲乡; traditional Chinese: 息仲鄉; pinyin: Xīzhòng Xiāng) in Baoding, Hebei, China
- Xizhong Island (simplified Chinese: 西中岛; traditional Chinese: 西中島; pinyin: Xizhōng Dǎo)
- Xīzhòng (希仲), the courtesy name of Lu Yuanfang, an official of Wu Zetian's Zhou Dynasty
