= Xingyi =

Xingyi may refer to:

- Xingyiquan, one of the major internal Chinese martial arts
- The Oath (Singaporean TV series), a 2011 TV series

== Places in China ==
- Xingyi, Guizhou, a county-level city in Guizhou
- Xingyi, Chongqing (兴义), a town in Fengdu County, Chongqing
- Xingyi, Hebei (邢邑), a town in Dingzhou, Hebei
- Xingyi, Sichuan (兴义), a town in Xinjin County, Sichuan
