= Wang Gao =

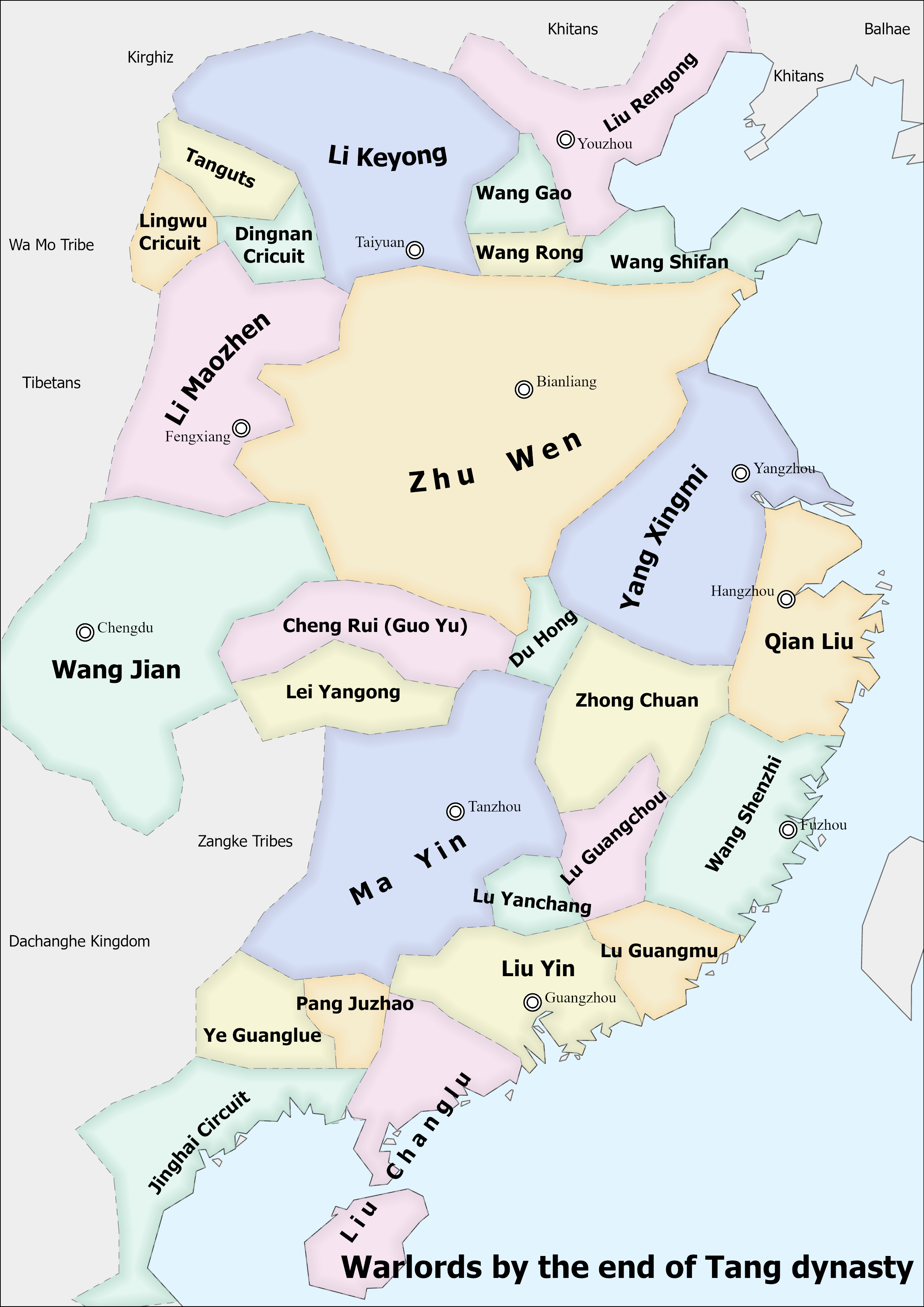
- Map of the warlords of the late Tang c. 900, the territory of Wang Gao marked in the north
- Chinese: 王郜
Transcriptions
Standard Mandarin
- Hanyu Pinyin: Wáng Gào
- Wade–Giles: Wang Kao

Wang Gao (fl. 900) was a Chinese warlord near the end of the Tang dynasty. Born into a wealthy and powerful military dynasty, he served as the largely independent military governor (jiedushi) of Yiwu (around modern Baoding, Hebei), succeeding his father Wang Chucun to the post in 895 and losing it to his cousin Wang Chuzhi in 900 after fleeing battle with the forces of Zhu Quanzhong, the warlord who subsequently established the Later Liang Empire.

== Life ==
It is uncertain when in the 9th century Wang Gao was born. His father Wang Chucun was made the military governor (jiedushi) of Yiwu in 879, after which Wang Gao became his lieutenant (副大使, fudashi). After Wang Chucun's death in 895, the soldiers supported Wang Gao replacing him as acting military governor. The Tang emperor Zhaozong accepted this and then formally commissioned him to the position. In 897, the emperor gave Wang Gao the honorary chancellor designation Tong Zhongshu Menxia Pingzhangshi (同中書門下平章事).

Zhu Quanzhong, the military governor of Xuanwu (宣武) around modern Kaifeng, Henan, was an archrival of Wang Gao's ally Li Keyong, the military governor of Hedong (河東) around modern Taiyuan, Shanxi. In 900, Zhu sent his general Zhang Cunjing (張存敬) north to try to subdue Li Keyong's allies east of the Taihang Mountains. After first forcing the submission of Wang Rong, the military governor of Chengde (成德) around modern Shijiazhuang, Hebei, Zhang attacked Yiwu. Wang Gao sent his uncle Wang Chuzhi to command the vanguard resisting Zhang's advance. Wang Chuzhi advocated building palisades to impede and exhaust the Xuanwu army before engaging them. However, the officer Liang Wen (梁汶) advocated an immediate confrontation, as Yiwu's army already outnumbered the invading force. Wang Gao ordered his uncle to adopt Liang's strategy, producing a crushing defeat that killed over half of the Yiwu soldiers. Wang Chuzhi retreated with the survivors to Yiwu's capital at Dingzhou. Hearing of the defeat, however, Wang Gao had not remained in Dingzhou but fled to Hedong. Li Keyong gave him an honorary post when Wang Chuzhi replaced him in command at Yiwu and secured a separate peace with Xuanwu by agreeing to ally with Zhu.

Wang Gao died at some point early in the Tianfu Era (901–904).
