= Tomb of Wang Chuzhi =

Tang dynasty grave in Hebei province, China

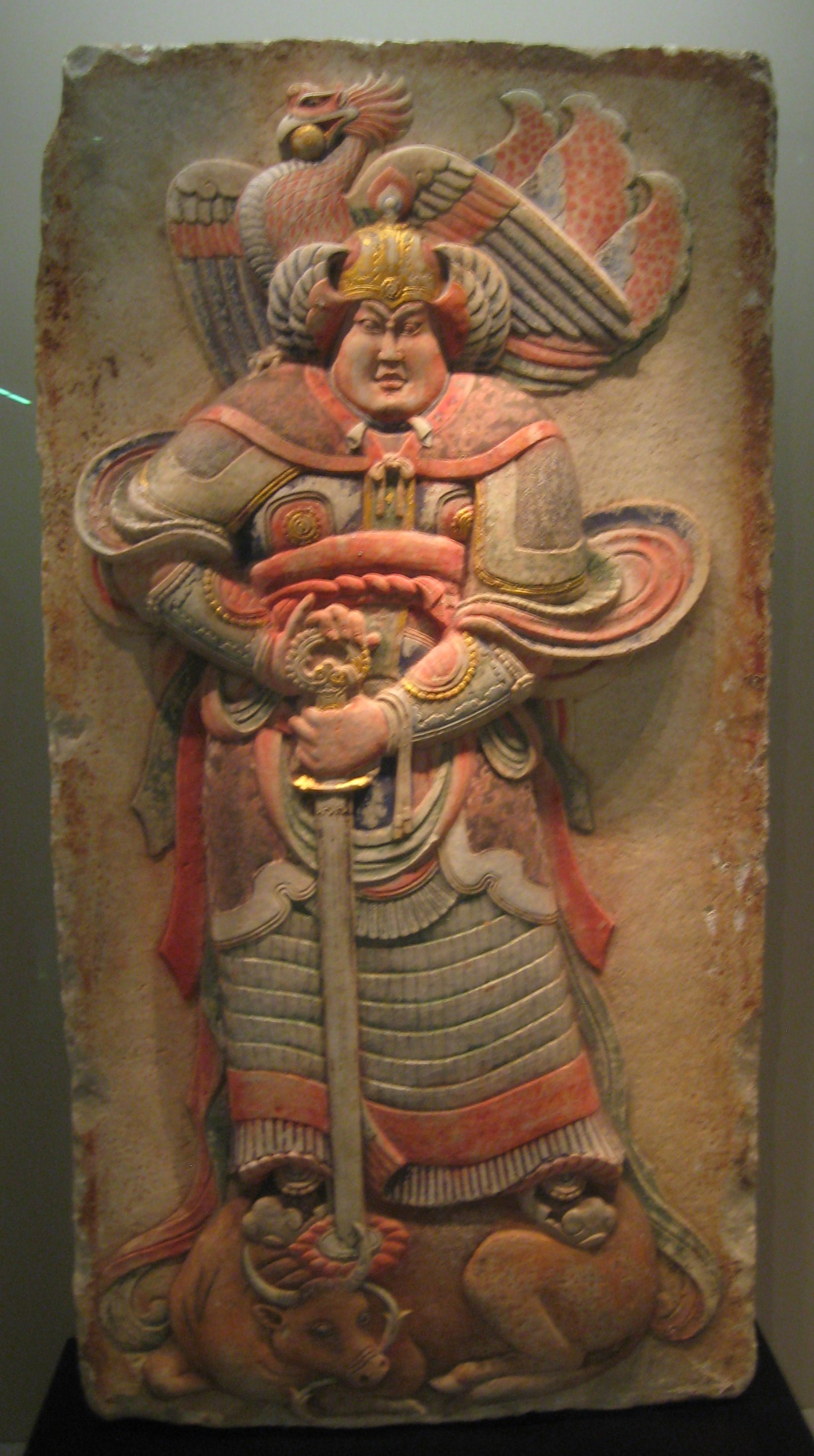
- Stone relief from the tomb, looted in 1994, seized and returned in 2001, and now held at the National Museum in Beijing, China
- Traditional Chinese: 王處直墓
- Simplified Chinese: 王处直墓
Transcriptions
Standard Mandarin
- Hanyu Pinyin: Wáng Chùzhí mù
- Wade–Giles: Wang Ch'u-chih mu

The Tomb of Wang Chuzhi is the grave of Wang Chuzhi (d. 6 February 923), the powerful and sometimes independent Prince of Beiping and military governor (jiedushi) of Yiwu in Baoding, Hebei, during the end of the Tang and during the Later Liang period of the Five Dynasties and Ten Kingdoms Era of Chinese history. Located in Baoding's Quyang County, the tomb's funerary art illustrates the elite music of the era and is now partially displayed at the National Museum in Beijing.

== History ==
Wang Chuzhi was overthrown by his adoptive son Wang Du in 921 and died two years later on 6 February 923. His tomb was rediscovered in 1980 in Xiyanchuan Village (西燕川村) near Lingshan in Baoding's Quyang County. The grave was robbed in July 1994 because of the high artistic level of its wall paintings and reliefs, which are of great historical value. The thieves used dynamite to blast their way into the tomb before removing several painted marble relief panels. The tomb was subsequently officially excavated in 1995. One of the panels was advertised for sale in a Christie's New York Fine Chinese Ceramics, Paintings, and Works of Art auction catalogue in 2000. It was seized by US Customs in response to a request made by the Chinese government and the stolen panel was returned to China in 2001. It is now on display at the National Museum of China in Beijing.

== Art ==
A group of servants and a 15-member ladies' orchestra are depicted on two painted marble reliefs. It provides information about the musical tastes of the upper classes during the late Tang dynasty.

On the Western wall of the tomb, there are twelve people in an orchestra. In the front row there are five women (from right to left) playing the konghou (bow harp), the guzheng (an 18–23-stringed plucked zither with moveable bridges), pipa (lute), paiban (bamboo clapper) and dagu (大鼓; bass drum) while, in the back row, there are seven women playing the sheng ( mouth organ), fangxiang (Chinese metallophone), dalagu (答臘鼓; West Asian cylindrical drum), two bili (篳篥; oboes), and two bamboo transverse flutes (hengdi 橫笛 or dizi). At the far right of the front row is a female conductor dressed like a man with two children dancers in front of her.

== Gallery ==
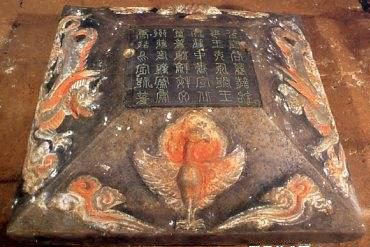
Epitaph of the tomb of Wang Chuzhi

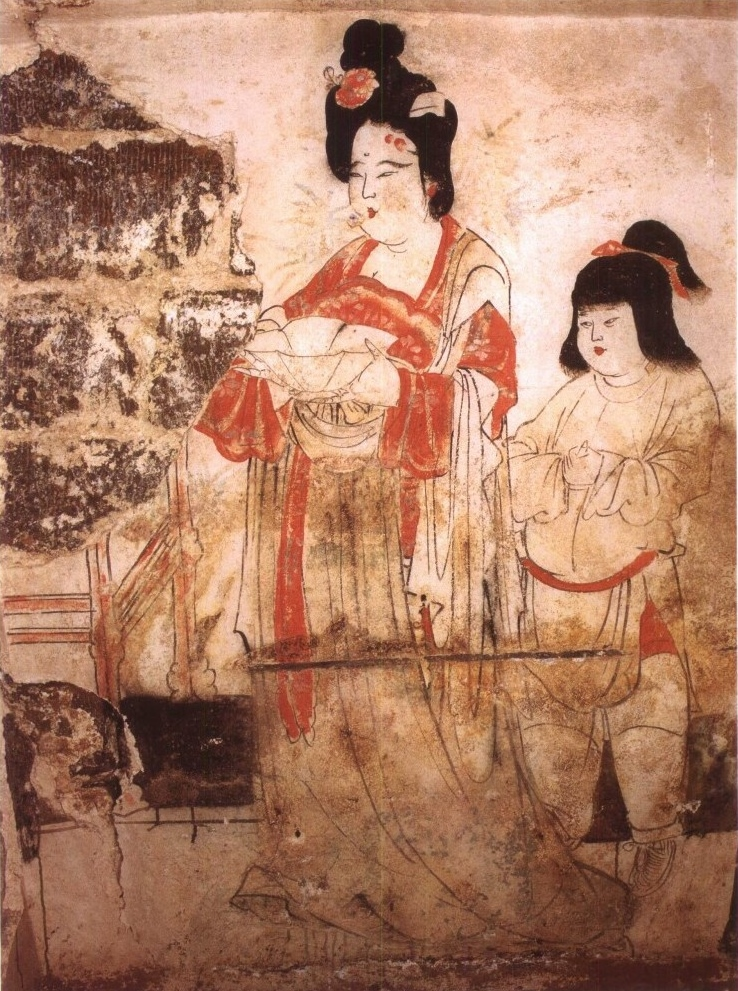

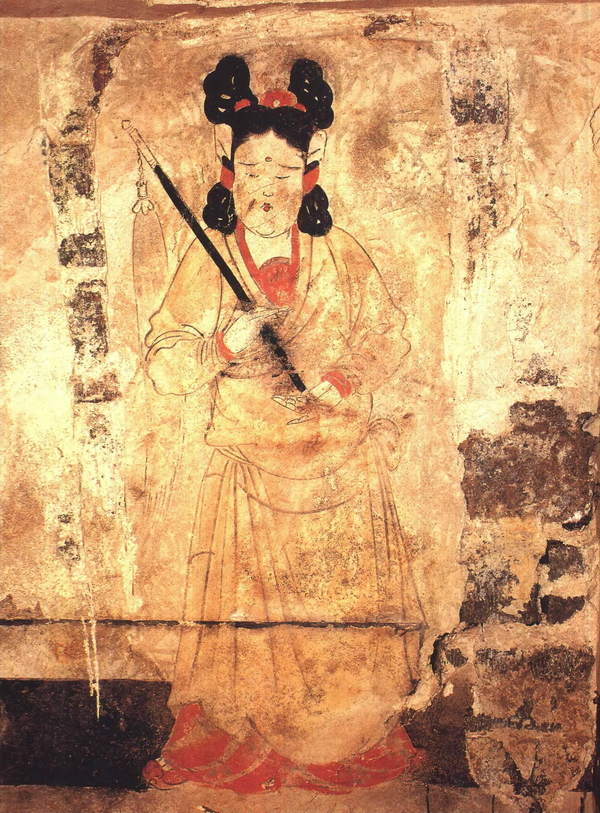

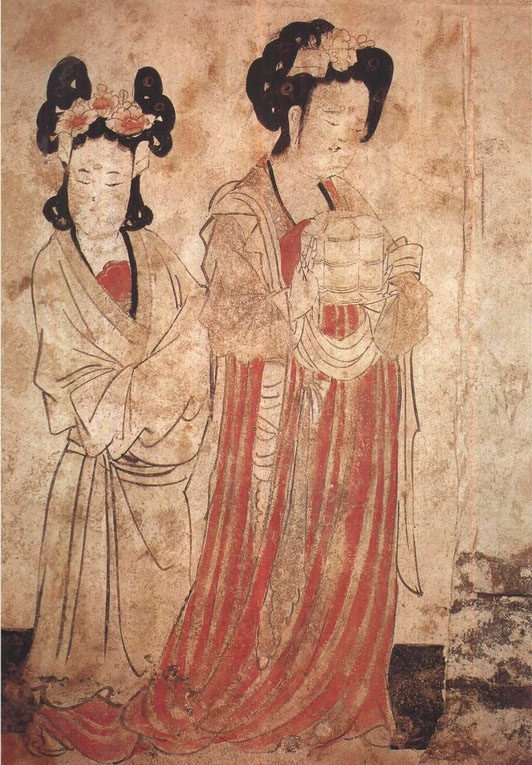

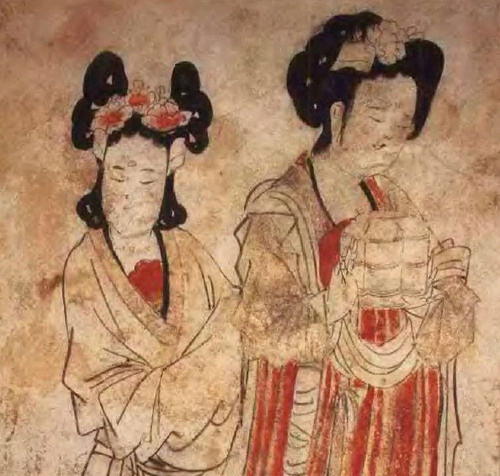

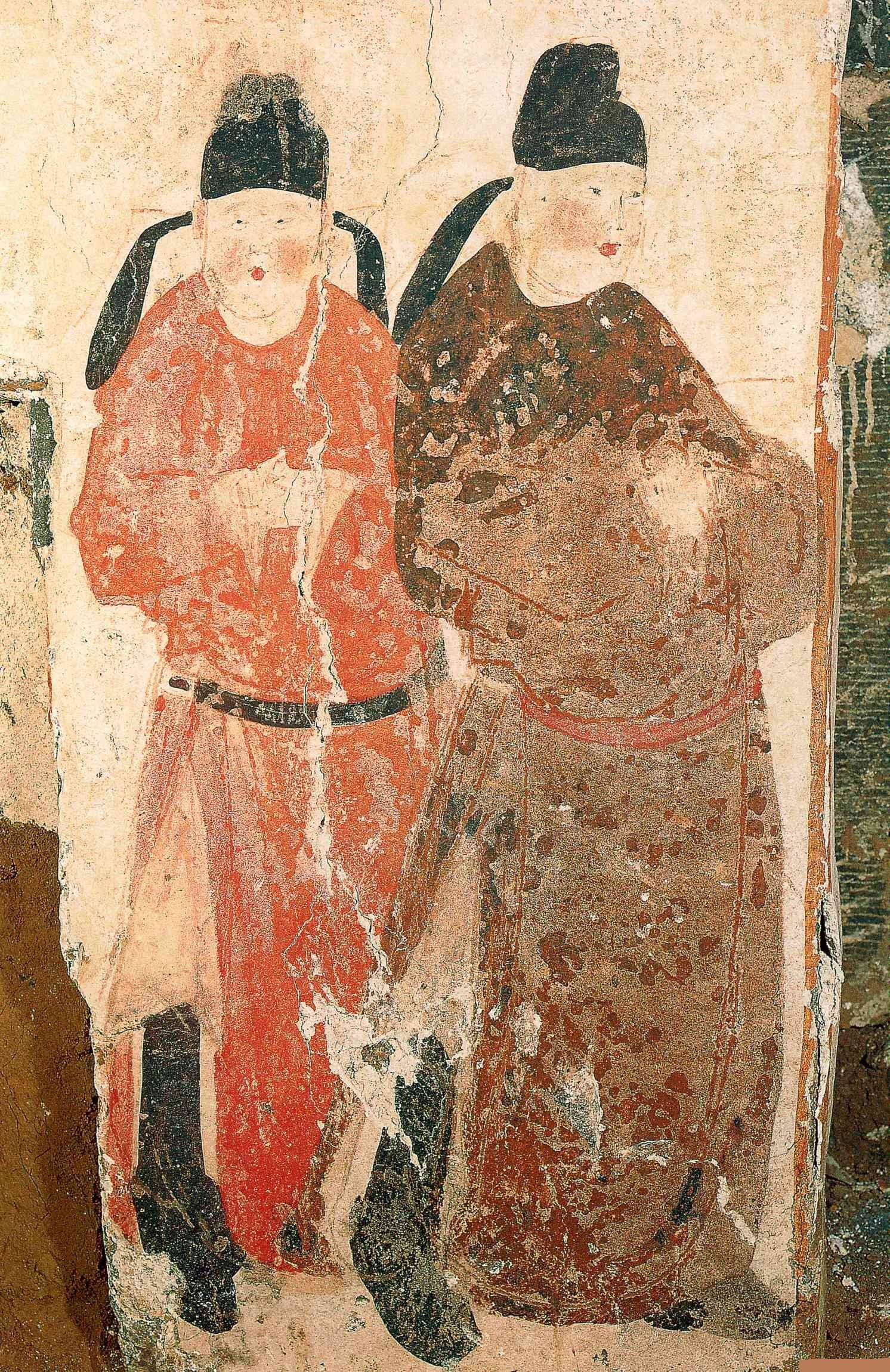

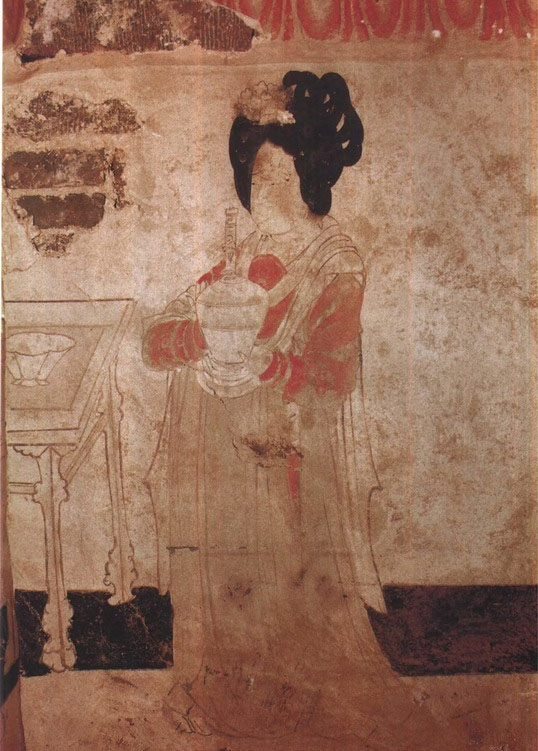

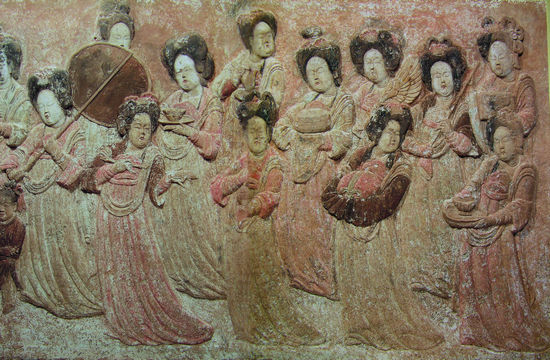

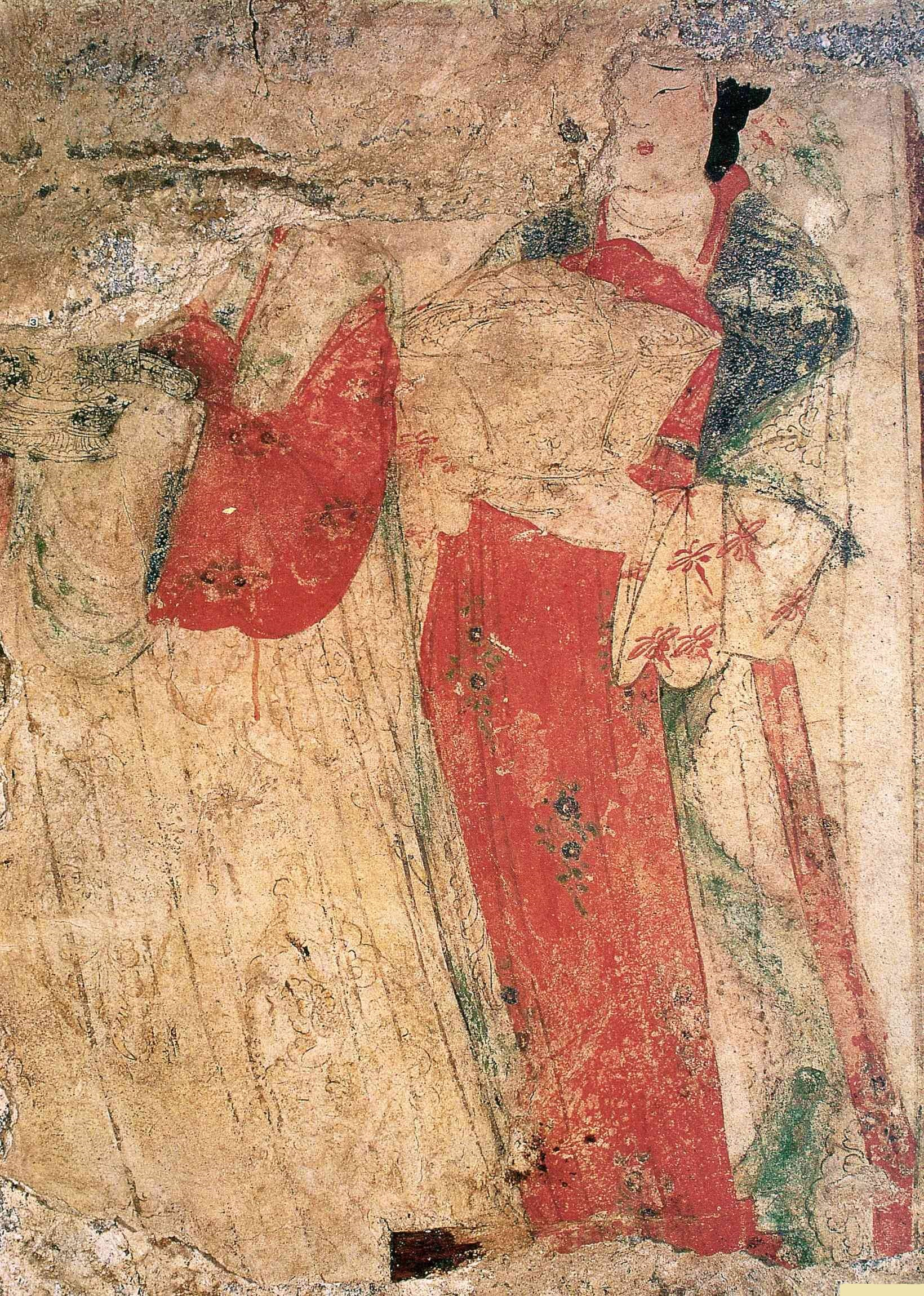

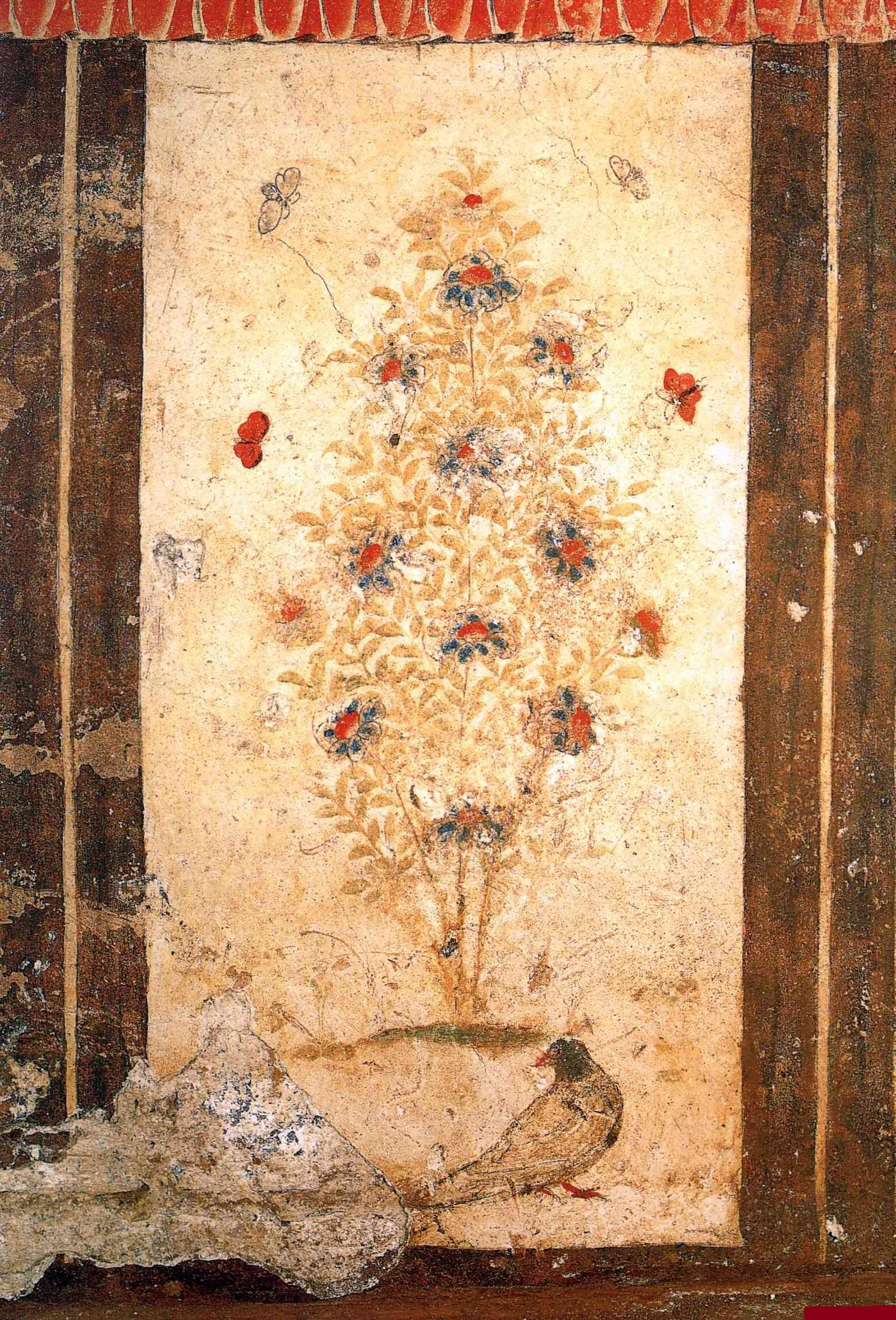

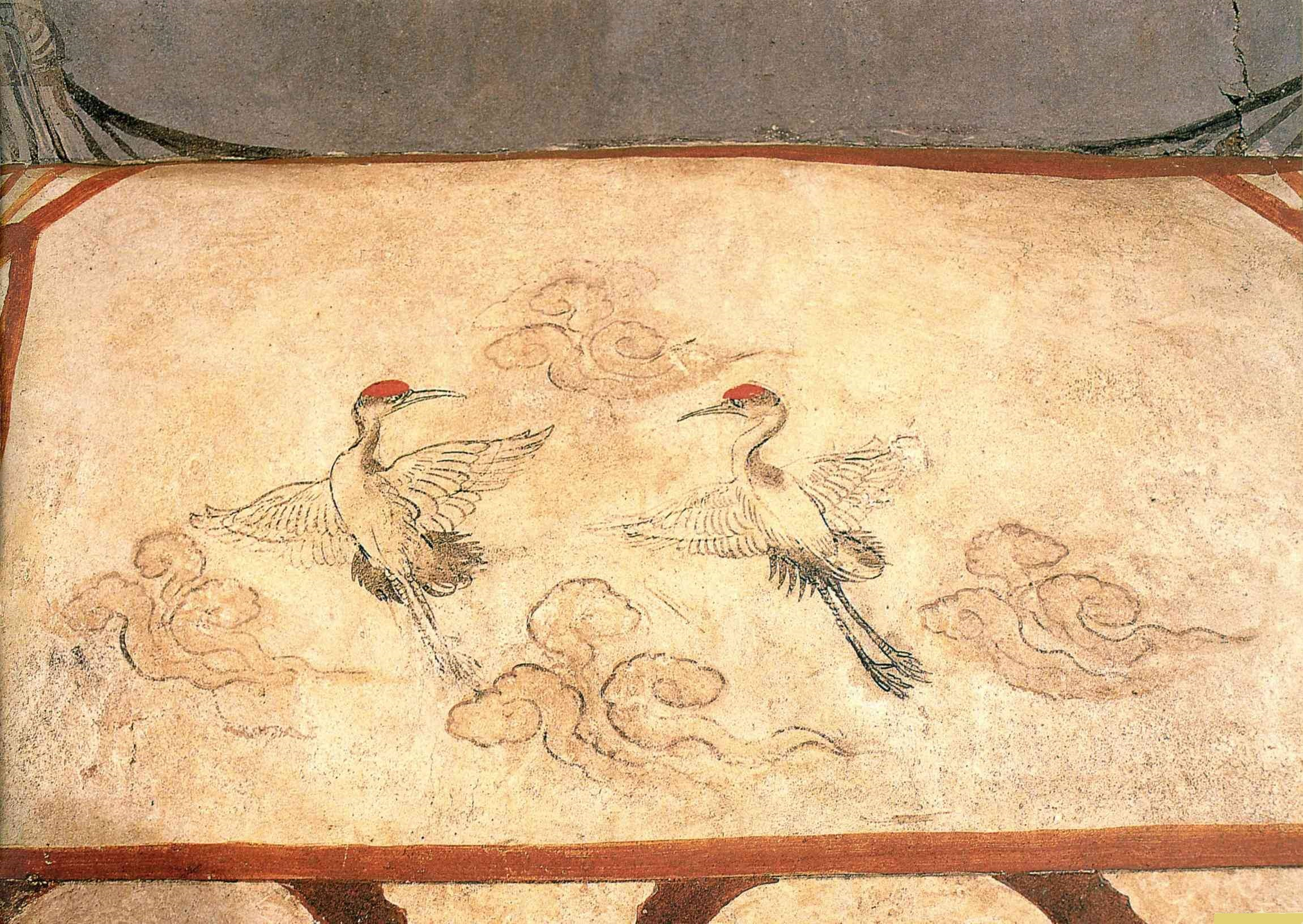

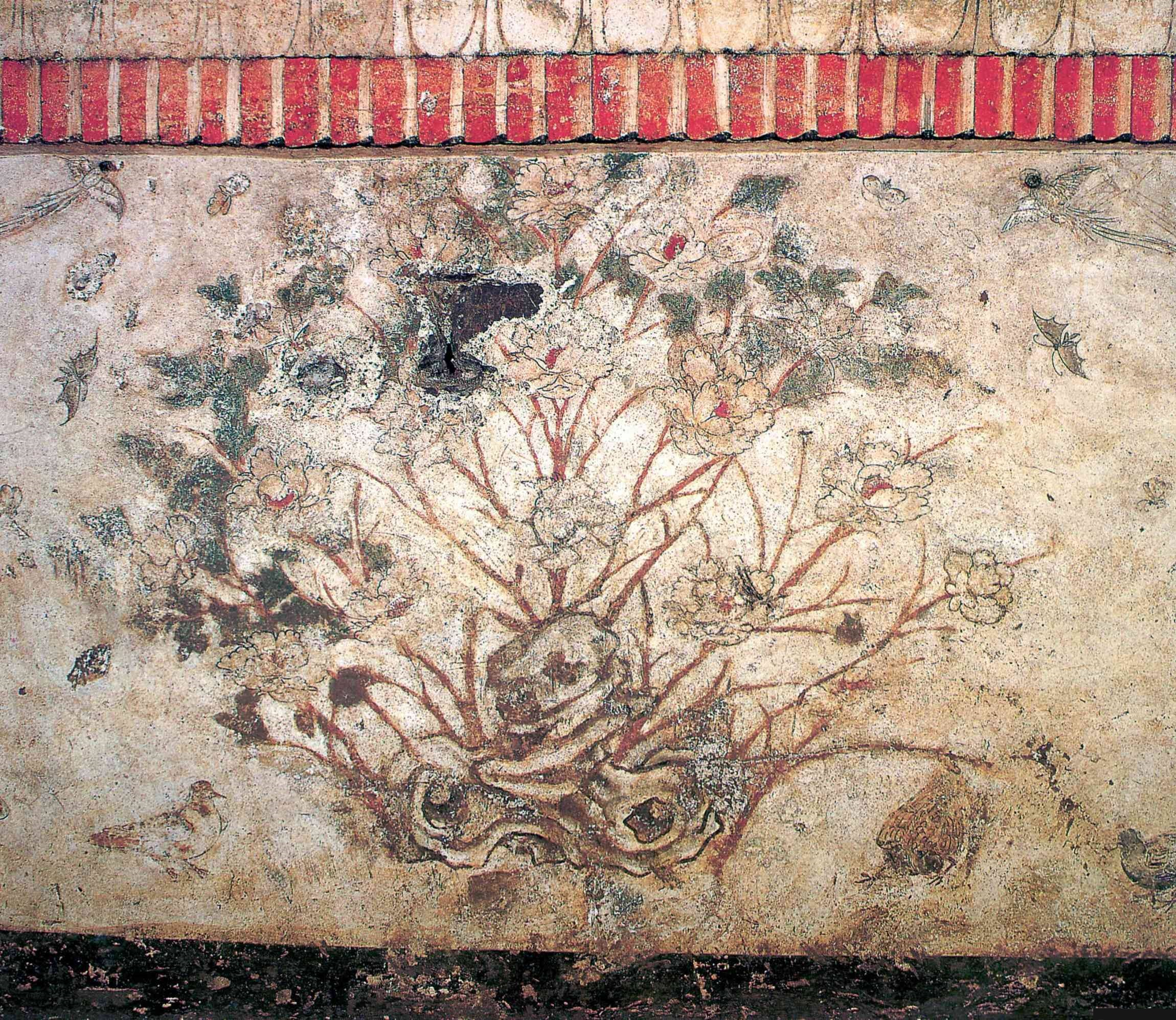

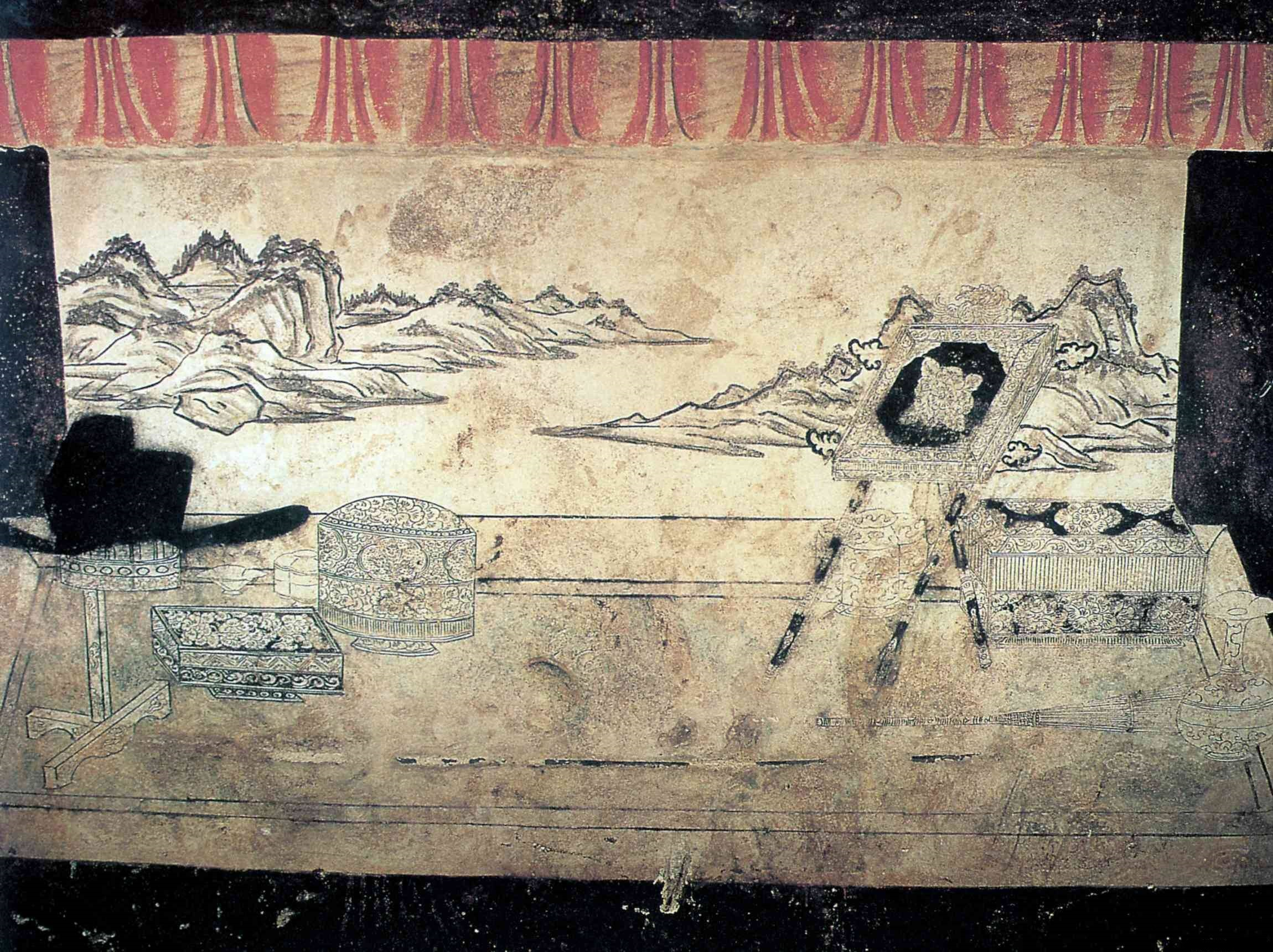

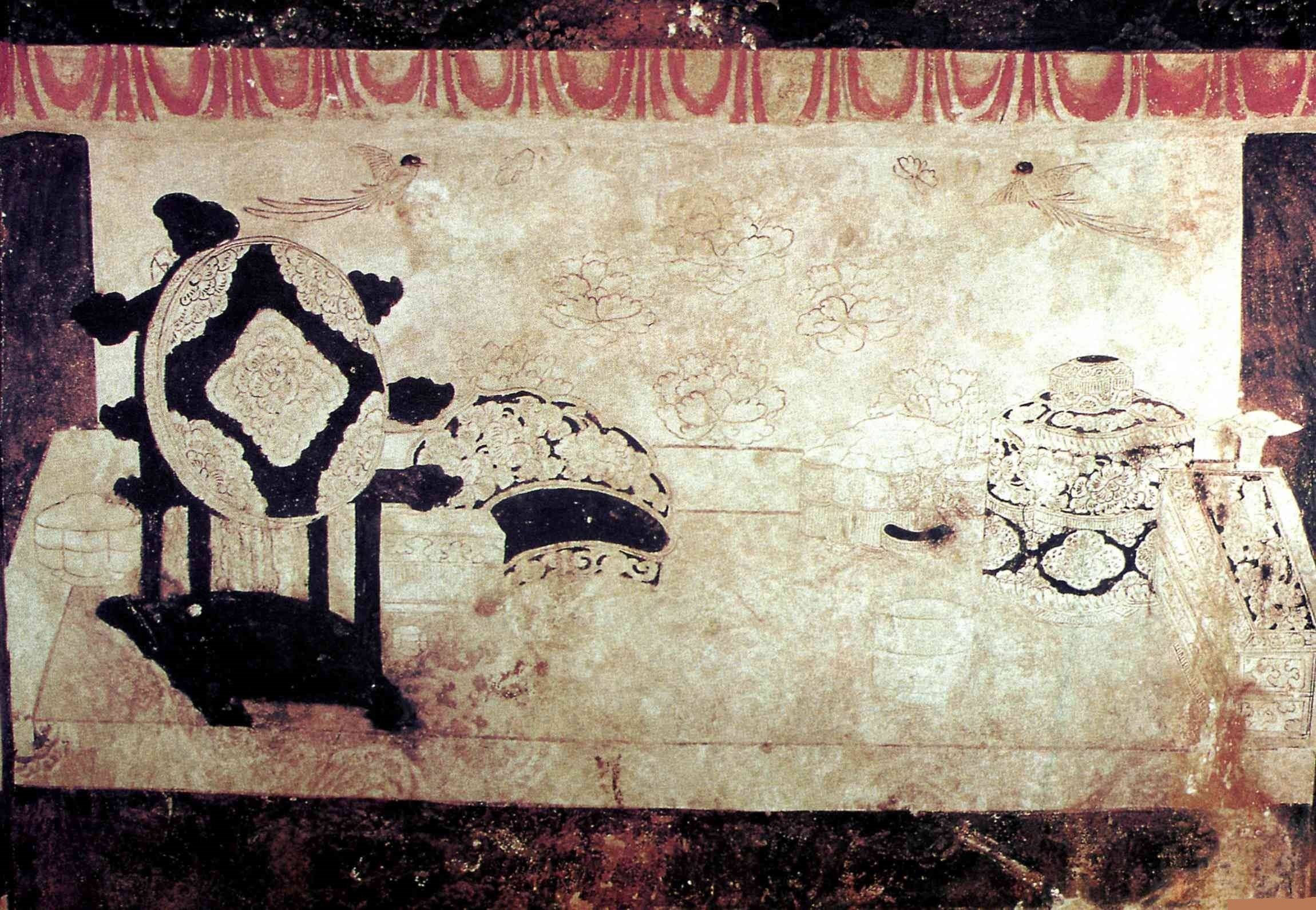

== See also ==
- List of traditional Chinese musical instruments
