= Shengyou =

Shengyou 绳油村
- Village
- Location in Hebei
- Coordinates: 38°29′25″N 114°49′32″E
- Country: People's Republic of China
- Province: Hebei
- Prefecture-level city: Baoding
- County-level city: Dingzhou
- Town: Kaiyuan
- Time zone: UTC+8 (China Standard)

Shengyou (simplified Chinese: 绳油; traditional Chinese: 繩油; pinyin: Shéngyóu) is a village in Kaiyuan (开元镇), south of Dingzhou City in Hebei, China.

== History ==
On the night of April 20, 2005, and later in the early morning of June 11, 2015, occurred incidents in which over two hundred allegedly hired thugs descended on the village and clashed with local residents over a land dispute with a nearby power company. Seven people were killed, and 48 others were injured and hospitalized, eight of whom were in critical condition. The chaos was captured on video by one of the farmers and later released by The Washington Post.

== See also ==
- List of villages in China
