= Dongting (town) =

Dongting 东亭镇
- Town
- Dongtingzhen
- Location in Hebei Dongting (China)
- Coordinates: 38°28′54.6″N 115°08′08.0″E
- Country: People's Republic of China
- Province: Hebei
- Prefecture-level city: Baoding
- County-level city: Dingzhou

Area
  - Total: 48.71 km^{2} (18.81 sq mi)

Population (2010)
  - Total: 33,772
  - Density: 693.3/km^{2} (1,796/sq mi)
- Time zone: UTC+8 (China Standard)
- Local dialing code: 312

Dongting (Chinese: 东亭镇; pinyin: Dōngtíng zhèn) is a town in Dingzhou, Baoding, Hebei, China. In 2010, Dongting had a total population of 33,772: 16,878 males and 16,894 females: 5,731 aged under 14, 24,942 aged between 15 and 65, and 3,099 aged over 65.

== See also ==
- List of township-level divisions of Hebei
