= Mingyuedian =

Mingyuedian 明月店镇
- Town
- Mingyuedianzhen
- Location in Hebei Mingyuedian (China)
- Coordinates: 38°27′09.3″N 114°53′49.1″E
- Country: People's Republic of China
- Province: Hebei
- Prefecture-level city: Baoding
- County-level city: Dingzhou

Area
  - Total: 41.18 km^{2} (15.90 sq mi)

Population (2010)
  - Total: 46,049
  - Density: 1,118/km^{2} (2,896/sq mi)
- Time zone: UTC+8 (China Standard)
- Local dialing code: 312

Mingyuedian (Chinese: 明月店镇; pinyin: Míngyuèdiàn zhèn) is a town in Dingzhou, Baoding, Hebei, China. In 2010, Mingyuedian had a total population of 46,049: 23,116 males and 22,933 females: 9,334 aged under 14, 33,742 aged between 15 and 65, and 2,973 aged over 65.

== See also ==
- List of township-level divisions of Hebei
