= Zhuanlu =

Zhuanlu 砖路镇
- Town
- Zhuanluzhen
- Location in Hebei Zhuanlu (China)
- Coordinates: 38°38′35″N 114°56′34″E
- Country: People's Republic of China
- Province: Hebei
- Prefecture-level city: Baoding
- County-level city: Dingzhou

Area
  - Total: 56.70 km^{2} (21.89 sq mi)

Population (2010)
  - Total: 53,697
  - Density: 947.0/km^{2} (2,453/sq mi)
- Time zone: UTC+8 (China Standard)
- Local dialing code: 312

Zhuanlu (Chinese: 砖路镇; pinyin: Zhuānlù zhèn) is a town in Dingzhou, Baoding, Hebei, China. In 2010, Zhuanlu had a total population of 53,697: 26,716 males and 26,981 females: 12,240 aged under 14, 37,567 aged between 15 and 65, and 3,890 aged over 65.

== See also ==
- List of township-level divisions of Hebei
