= Liqingu =

Liqingu 李亲顾镇
- Town
- Liqinguzhen
- Location in Hebei Liqingu (China)
- Coordinates: 38°20′55.4″N 115°05′35.4″E
- Country: People's Republic of China
- Province: Hebei
- Prefecture-level city: Baoding
- County-level city: Dingzhou

Area
  - Total: 50.37 km^{2} (19.45 sq mi)

Population (2010)
  - Total: 47,398
  - Density: 941.0/km^{2} (2,437/sq mi)
- Time zone: UTC+8 (China Standard)
- Local dialing code: 312

Liqingu (Chinese: 李亲顾镇; pinyin: Lǐqīngù zhèn) is a town in Dingzhou, Baoding, Hebei, China. In 2010, Liqingu had a total population of 47,398: 23,776 males and 23,622 females: 8,031 aged under 14, 35,386 aged between 15 and 65, and 3,981 aged over 65.

== See also ==
- List of township-level divisions of Hebei
