= Dongliuchun Township =

Dōngliúchūn 东留春乡
- Township
- Dōngliúchūn Xiāng
- Location in Hebei Dōngliúchūn (China)
- Coordinates: 38°22′23.9″N 115°07′26.3″E
- Country: People's Republic of China
- Province: Hebei
- Prefecture-level city: Baoding
- County-level city: Dingzhou

Area
  - Total: 49.42 km^{2} (19.08 sq mi)

Population (2010)
  - Total: 29,567
  - Density: 598.3/km^{2} (1,550/sq mi)
- Time zone: UTC+8 (China Standard)
- Local dialing code: 312

Dongliuchun (Chinese: 东留春乡; pinyin: Dōngliúchūn xiāng) is a township in Dingzhou, Baoding, Hebei, China. As of the 2010 census, Dōngliúchūn had a total population of 29,567: 14,974 males and 14,593 females. The population is distributed as follows: 4,743 people aged under 14, 21,799 people aged between 15 and 64, and 3,025 people aged over 65.

== See also ==
List of township-level divisions of Hebei
