= Haotouzhuang Hui Ethnic Township =

Haotouzhuang Hui Ethnic Township 号头庄回族乡 هَوْتِوْتُوْا خُوِذُو سِیْا
- Ethnic township
- Location in Hebei
- Coordinates: 38°26′02″N 115°05′14″E
- Country: People's Republic of China
- Province: Hebei
- Prefecture-level city: Baoding
- County-level city: Dingzhou
- Village-level divisions: 17 villages
- Elevation: 44 m (144 ft)
- Time zone: UTC+8 (China Standard)
- Area code: 0312

Haotouzhuang Hui Ethnic Township (simplified Chinese: 号头庄回族乡; traditional Chinese: 號頭莊回族鄉; pinyin: Hàotóuzhuāng Huízú Xiāng; Xiao'erjing: هَوْتِوْتُوْا خُوِذُو سِیْا) is an ethnic township under the administration of Dingzhou City in Hebei province, China, located about 12 kilometres (7.5 mi) southeast of downtown Dingzhou in the southern part of Baoding City. As of 2011, it has 17 villages under its administration.

== See also ==
- List of township-level divisions of Hebei
