= Pangcun =

Pangcun 庞村镇
- Town
- Pangcunzhen
- Location in Hebei Pangcun (China)
- Coordinates: 38°37′06.5″N 114°58′53.3″E
- Country: People's Republic of China
- Province: Hebei
- Prefecture-level city: Baoding
- County-level city: Dingzhou

Area
  - Total: 46.17 km^{2} (17.83 sq mi)

Population (2010)
  - Total: 46,582
  - Density: 1,009/km^{2} (2,613/sq mi)
- Time zone: UTC+8 (China Standard)
- Local dialing code: 312

Pangcun (Chinese: 庞村镇; pinyin: Pángcūn zhèn) is a town in Dingzhou, Baoding, Hebei, China. In 2010, Pangcun had a total population of 46,582: 23,361 males and 23,221 females: 8,482 aged under 14, 34,199 aged between 15 and 65, and 3,901 aged over 65.

== See also ==
- List of township-level divisions of Hebei
