= Wang Jianli =

Wang Jianli (王建立) (871-July 4, 940), formally the Prince of Han (韓王), was a general of the Chinese Five Dynasties and Ten Kingdoms Period state Later Tang and Later Jin, who also briefly served as a chancellor during the reign of Later Tang's second emperor Li Siyuan.

== Background ==
Wang Jianli was born in 871, during the reign of Emperor Yizong of Tang. It is known that he was from Yushe, but all that is known about his family background were the names of his great-grandfather Wang Qiu (王秋), grandfather Wang Jia (王嘉), and father Wang Bian (王弁). In his youth, he was said to be ferocious and not careful in his behavior.

== During Jin and Later Tang ==
=== During Li Cunxu's reign ===
After Tang had fallen, Wang Jianli's home region came under the rule of Jin, and, at some point, after Li Siyuan, an adoptive brother of and general under Li Cunxu the Prince of Jin, was commissioned as the prefect of Dai Prefecture (代州, in modern Xinzhou, Shanxi), he became the disciplinary officer of LI Siyuan's army. At that time, Li Cunxu's capital was at Taiyuan, but the tombs of his grandfather Li Guochang and father Li Keyong were at Dai, so he often sent female servants to offer sacrifices to them. These female servants of the prince often disrupted the lives of the people of Dai, and Wang would arrest and whip them. When Li Cunxu heard of this, he was angry and wanted to kill Wang, but Li Siyuan interceded on his behalf, and he was spared. Wang thus became well known in the realm. Throughout Li Cunxu's reign, both as the Prince of Jin and later, after Li Cunxu established a new Later Tang as its emperor, whenever Li Siyuan received a new governorship assignment, he would take Wang with him and have Wang serve as a commander of his headquarters guard corps.

In 926, when many mutinies rose against Li Cunxu's rule, Li Siyuan was also forced by his own soldiers into leading one of the rebellions, at Yedu (鄴都, in modern Handan, Hebei). At that time, as Li Siyuan was serving as the military governor (Jiedushi) of Chengde Circuit (成德, headquartered in modern Shijiazhuang, Hebei), his family members were at Chengde's capital Zhen Prefecture (鎮州), and Wang was serving as the headquarters guard commander there. To prevent the eunuch monitor of the army (whom Li Cunxu had commissioned) from killing Li Siyuan's family members, Wang preemptively killed the eunuch monitor and the soldiers under him. He then gathered his troops and joined forces with Li Siyuan's adoptive son Li Congke, and they then joined Li Siyuan on his march south toward the capital Luoyang. Shortly after, Li Cunxu was killed in a mutiny at Luoyang itself. Li Siyuan thereafter arrived at Luoyang and claimed imperial title.

=== During Li Siyuan's reign ===
For his contributions to Li Siyuan's regime, Wang Jianli was initially made the deputy military governor of Chengde and given the honorary title of acting Situ (司徒). Thereafter, in fairly short succession, he was made the acting military governor of Chengde, and then full military governor. He was also given the honorary chancellor designation of Tong Zhongshu Menxia Pingzhangshi (同中書門下平章事) and the honorary title of acting Taiwei (太尉).

At that time, however, the imperial government was dominated by Li Siyuan's powerful chief of staff An Chonghui. An disliked Wang, and therefore accused him of aligning with the semi-independent warlord Wang Du the military governor of neighboring Yiwu Circuit (義武, headquartered in modern Baoding, Hebei). Wang, in turn, accused An of being power hungry, requesting permission to head to Luoyang to personally discuss the matter with Li Siyuan. Li Siyuan agreed. Once Wang was at Luoyang, he accused An and Zhang Yanlang (張延郎) the director of palace affairs and the acting director of the three financial agencies (taxation, treasury, and salt and iron monopolies) of improperly close association (one of An's children had married one of Zhang's children) and monopolizing power. In anger, Li Siyuan initially wanted to send An and Zhang out of the imperial government to posts outside Luoyang and replace An with Wang, but changed his mind after the other director of palace affairs, Zhu Hongzhao, spoke on An's behalf. However, when Wang then asked to return to Chengde, Li Siyuan decided to keep him at Luoyang. He gave Wang the titles of You Pushe (右僕射, one of the heads of the executive bureau of government (尚書省, Shangshu Sheng)), Zhongshu Shilang (中書侍郎, deputy head of the legislative bureau (中書省, Zhongshu Sheng)), and chancellor; he also made Wang the acting director of the three financial agencies, replacing Zhang. As Wang was illiterate, he tried to decline the directorship of the three financial agencies, but Li Siyuan refused.

In 928, with An back in good graces of Li Siyuan's, Wang was sent out to serve as the military governor of Pinglu Circuit (平盧, headquartered in modern Weifang, Shandong). In or around 930, he was moved to Zhaoyi Circuit (昭義, headquartered in modern Changzhi, Shanxi), but as he travelled from Pinglu to Zhaoyi, he went through Wei Prefecture (魏州, i.e., Yedu). As he did, An submitted an accusation to Li Siyuan that Wang was making statements at Wei that were affecting the people there. As a result, Li Siyuan ordered Wang into retirement, giving him the title of Taifu. In retirement, he made several requests to see the emperor, but was refused. He decided to, without permission, head to Luoyang and enter the rear tower in the palace to see Li Siyuan. He wept and said that he had not committed a crime, but had been falsely accused by An. Li Siyuan responded, "While serving as military governor, you had not done well. Would it really be just An Chonghui who accuses you?" Li Siyuan did not punish him, but gave him a gift of tea and sent him away.

=== After Li Siyuan's reign ===
It was not until after Li Siyuan had died and Li Congke were emperor (r. 934-936) that Li Congke recalled Wang Jianli back to active service, as the military governor of TianpIng Circuit (天平, headquartered in modern Tai'an, Shandong). It was said that, as Wang Jianli was a long-time disciplinary officer, he was a harsh military governor, such that if there were wicked people in his realm, he would slaughter their entire families. This earned him the nickname of Wang Duodie (王垜疊, "Wang the Stacker"), referring to his executing people so much that the bodies stacked up. Later, when he heard that Li Congke was near defeat when his brother-in-law (Li Siyuan's son-in-law) Shi Jingtang rebelled against him, he took the chance to kill his deputy military governor Wang Yanyun (王彥贇) and a secretary, both of whom he disliked. This caused people to view him even more negatively.

== During Later Jin ==
After Shi Jingtang successfully overthrew Li Congke and established his own Later Jin as its emperor in 936, Fang Zhiwen (房知溫) the military governor of Pinglu happened to die at that tie, and Shi sent Wang Jianli to take his army to patrol the Pinglu region, apparently concerned that Fang's soldiers might mutiny. Shortly after, Shi made him the military governor of Pinglu, and gave him the honorary titles of acting Taiwei and Zhongshu Ling (中書令). It was said that by this point, Wang's disposition had changed, as he had become a Buddhist. He was generous to the monks and building temples, and his harsh nature had softened, with his no longer killing many people. His people thus became more comforted.

In 937, Shi created Wang the Prince of Linzi. In 938, he changed Wang's title to Prince of Dongping. In 940, Wang went to then-capital Kaifeng to pay homage to the emperor. Shi stated, "He had already been like an older brother to me three decades ago. He will not be required to bow to me." He thus granted Wang the permission to enter the palace in a litter, and when Wang entered the imperial meeting hall, he had two eunuchs support Wang's weight. This was considered a great honor. After meeting the emperor, Wang requested retirement, but Shi declined it, making him the military governor of Zhaoyi again. Shi also created him the Prince of Han. Further, as Wang's home county of Yushe was within Liao Prefecture (遼州), Shi added Liao and Qin (沁州, in modern Changzhi) to Zhaoyi's territory, so that his old neighborhood can be glorified.

Less than a month after Wang's arrival at Zhaoyi's capital Lu Prefecture (潞州), there was a time when a meteorite fell into his mansion. Believing that this was a sign of his impending death, he drafted a will. He died shortly after, and was given posthumous honors.

== Notes and references ==
- History of the Five Dynasties, vol. 91.
- New History of the Five Dynasties, vol. 46.
- Zizhi Tongjian, vols. 274, 275, 276, 277, 280, 282.
