= Daluzhuang Township =

Daluzhuang 大鹿庄乡
- Township
- Dàlùzhuāng Xiāng
- Location in Hebei Daluzhuang (China)
- Coordinates: 38°31′55.6″N 115°06′00.5″E
- Country: People's Republic of China
- Province: Hebei
- Prefecture-level city: Baoding
- County-level city: Dingzhou

Area
  - Total: 60.80 km^{2} (23.48 sq mi)

Population (2010)
  - Total: 44,555
  - Density: 732.8/km^{2} (1,898/sq mi)
- Time zone: UTC+8 (China Standard)
- Local dialing code: 312

Daluzhuang (Chinese: 大鹿庄乡; pinyin: Dàlùzhuāng xiāng) is a township in Dingzhou, Baoding, Hebei, China. According to the 2010 census, Daluzhuang had a total population of 44,555: 22,520 males and 22,035 females. The population is distributed as follows: 7,261 people aged under 14, 33,359 people aged between 15 and 64, and 3,935 people aged over 65.

== See also ==
List of township-level divisions of Hebei
