= Qingfengdian =

Qingfengdian 清风店镇
- Town
- Location in Hebei
- Coordinates: 38°36′30″N 115°03′25″E
- Country: People's Republic of China
- Province: Hebei
- Prefecture-level city: Baoding
- County-level city: Dingzhou
- Village-level divisions: 27 villages

Area
  - Total: 53 km^{2} (20 sq mi)
- Elevation: 58 m (190 ft)

Population
  - Total: 49,000
  - Density: 920/km^{2} (2,400/sq mi)
- Time zone: UTC+8 (China Standard)
- Area code: 0312

Qingfengdian (simplified Chinese: 清风店; traditional Chinese: 清風店; pinyin: Qīngfēngdiàn) is a town under the administration of Dingzhou City in western Hebei province, China, located about 12 kilometres (7.5 mi) northeast of downtown Dingzhou and just off of China National Highway 107. It has an area of 53 square kilometres (20 sq mi) and a reported population of 49,000 people. Established in 1961, it underwent rural reform in 1982 and 1984 and became a full township in 1997. As of 2011, the town has jurisdiction over 27 villages.

== See also ==
- List of township-level divisions of Hebei
