= Kaiyuan, Hebei =

Kaiyuan 开元镇
- Town
- Kaiyuanzhen
- Location in Hebei Kaiyuan (China)
- Coordinates: 38°28′25.2″N 114°51′26.5″E
- Country: People's Republic of China
- Province: Hebei
- Prefecture-level city: Baoding
- County-level city: Dingzhou

Area
  - Total: 45.41 km^{2} (17.53 sq mi)

Population (2010)
  - Total: 49,538
  - Density: 1,091/km^{2} (2,825/sq mi)
- Time zone: UTC+8 (China Standard)
- Local dialing code: 312

Kaiyuan (Chinese: 开元镇; pinyin: Kāiyuán zhèn) is a town in Dingzhou, Baoding, Hebei, China. In 2010, Kaiyuan had a total population of 49,538: 25,073 males and 24,465 females: 9,729 aged under 14, 36,703 aged between 15 and 65, and 3,106 aged over 65.

== See also ==
- List of township-level divisions of Hebei
