= Dingningdian =

Dingningdian 叮咛店镇
- Town
- Dingningdianzhen
- Location in Hebei Dingningdian (China)
- Coordinates: 38°24′43.0″N 115°02′50.7″E
- Country: People's Republic of China
- Province: Hebei
- Prefecture-level city: Baoding
- County-level city: Dingzhou

Area
  - Total: 82.27 km^{2} (31.76 sq mi)

Population (2010)
  - Total: 54,494
  - Density: 662.4/km^{2} (1,716/sq mi)
- Time zone: UTC+8 (China Standard)
- Local dialing code: 312

Dingningdian (Chinese: 叮咛店镇; pinyin: Dīngníngdiàn zhèn) is a town in Dingzhou, Baoding, Hebei, China. In 2010, Dingningdian had a total population of 54,494: 27,556 males and 26,938 females: 11,089 aged under 14, 38,765 aged between 15 and 65, and 4,640 aged over 65.

== See also ==
- List of township-level divisions of Hebei
