= Ziwei =

Ziwei 子位镇
- Town
- Ziweizhen
- Location in Hebei Ziwei (China)
- Coordinates: 38°18′18.7″N 115°11′02.8″E
- Country: People's Republic of China
- Province: Hebei
- Prefecture-level city: Baoding
- County-level city: Dingzhou

Area
  - Total: 61.74 km^{2} (23.84 sq mi)

Population (2010)
  - Total: 43,118
  - Density: 698.4/km^{2} (1,809/sq mi)
- Time zone: UTC+8 (China Standard)
- Local dialing code: 312

Ziwei (Chinese: 子位镇; pinyin: Ziwèi zhèn) is a town in Dingzhou, Baoding, Hebei, China. In 2010, Ziwei had a total population of 43,118: 21,994 males and 21,124 females: 8,619 aged under 14, 30,878 aged between 15 and 65, and 3,621 aged over 65.

== See also ==
- List of township-level divisions of Hebei
