= Dongwang, Dingzhou =

Dongwang 东旺镇
- Town
- Dongwangzhen
- Location in Hebei Dongwang (China)
- Coordinates: 38°28′02.1″N 115°12′23.4″E
- Country: People's Republic of China
- Province: Hebei
- Prefecture-level city: Baoding
- County-level city: Dingzhou

Area
  - Total: 43.25 km^{2} (16.70 sq mi)

Population (2010)
  - Total: 31,953
  - Density: 738.8/km^{2} (1,913/sq mi)
- Time zone: UTC+8 (China Standard)
- Local dialing code: 312

Dongwang (Chinese: 东旺镇; pinyin: Dōngwàng zhèn) is a town in Dingzhou, Baoding, Hebei, China. In 2010, Dongwang had a total population of 31,953: 16,207 males and 15,746 females: 4,718 aged under 14, 24,219 aged between 15 and 65, and 3,016 aged over 65.

== See also ==
- List of township-level divisions of Hebei
