= Xingyi, Hebei =

Coordinates: 38°18′27″N 115°01′05″E

Xingyi 邢邑
- Town

Chinese transcription(s)
- Interactive map of Xingyi
- Country: China
- Province: Hebei
- Prefecture: Baoding
- County-level city: Dingzhou
- Time zone: UTC+8 (China Standard Time)

Xingyi (Chinese: 邢邑; pinyin: Xíngyì) is a town situated in Dingzhou, Baoding, Hebei, China.

== See also ==
- List of township-level divisions of Hebei
