= Dongwang, Xingtai County =

Dongwang 东汪镇
- Town
- Dōngwāng Zhèn
- Location in Hebei Location in China
- Coordinates: 37°02′22″N 114°33′35″E
- Country: People's Republic of China
- Province: Hebei
- Prefecture-level city: Xingtai
- District: Xiangdu

Area
  - Total: 19.11 km^{2} (7.38 sq mi)

Population (2010)
  - Total: 32,557
- Time zone: UTC+8 (China Standard)

Dongwang (Chinese: 东汪镇; pinyin: Dōngwāng Zhèn) is a town located in Xiangdu District, Xingtai, Hebei, China. According to the 2010 census, Dongwang had a population of 32,557, including 16,523 males and 16,034 females. The population was distributed as follows: 6,415 people aged under 14, 24,378 people aged between 15 and 64, and 1,764 people aged over 65.

== See also ==
- List of township-level divisions of Hebei
