= Xizhong Township =

Xizhong Township 息仲乡
- Subdistrict

Chinese transcription(s)
  - Simplified: 息仲乡
  - Traditional: 息仲鄉
  - Pinyin: Xīzhòng Xiāng
- Country: China
- Province: Hebei
- Prefecture: Baoding
- Time zone: UTC+8 (China Standard Time)

Xizhong Township (simplified Chinese: 息仲乡; traditional Chinese: 息仲鄉; pinyin: Xīzhòng Xiāng) is a township-level division situated in Baoding, Hebei, China.

== See also ==
- List of township-level divisions of Hebei
