= Yiwu Province =

- Traditional Chinese: 義武軍
- Simplified Chinese: 义武军
Transcriptions
Standard Mandarin
- Hanyu Pinyin: Yìwǔ Jūn
- Wade–Giles: I-wu Chün

Yiding Province
- Traditional Chinese: 易定軍
- Simplified Chinese: 易定军
Transcriptions
Standard Mandarin
- Hanyu Pinyin: Yìdìng Jūn
- Wade–Giles: I-ting Chün

Yiwu Province, also known as Yiding Province, was a militarized province (軍, jūn) of the Tang and Five Dynasties eras of Chinese history. Controlled by powerful military governors (jiedushi), the province was often de facto independent of imperial control.

== Geography ==
Yiwu comprised the three prefectures of Ding, Yi, and Cang. Its capital was at Dingzhou, also known at the time as Anxi, and its territory covered parts of the modern prefectures of Baoding and Cangzhou in southeastern Hebei and nearby territory in Tianjin and Shandong.

== History ==
The Yiwu command was established in AD 782. It was recorded as having 27,401 households in the 813 census.

In the 920s, the Yiwu jiedushi Wang Du failed to assassinate the Later Tang general Wang Yanqiu and then allied with the Khitans against the Later Tang emperor Li Siyuan. Wang Yanqiu and Zhang Yanlang were able, however, to defeat the combined Yiwu and Khitan army.
