= Dingzhou =

Dingzhou 定州市
- County-level city
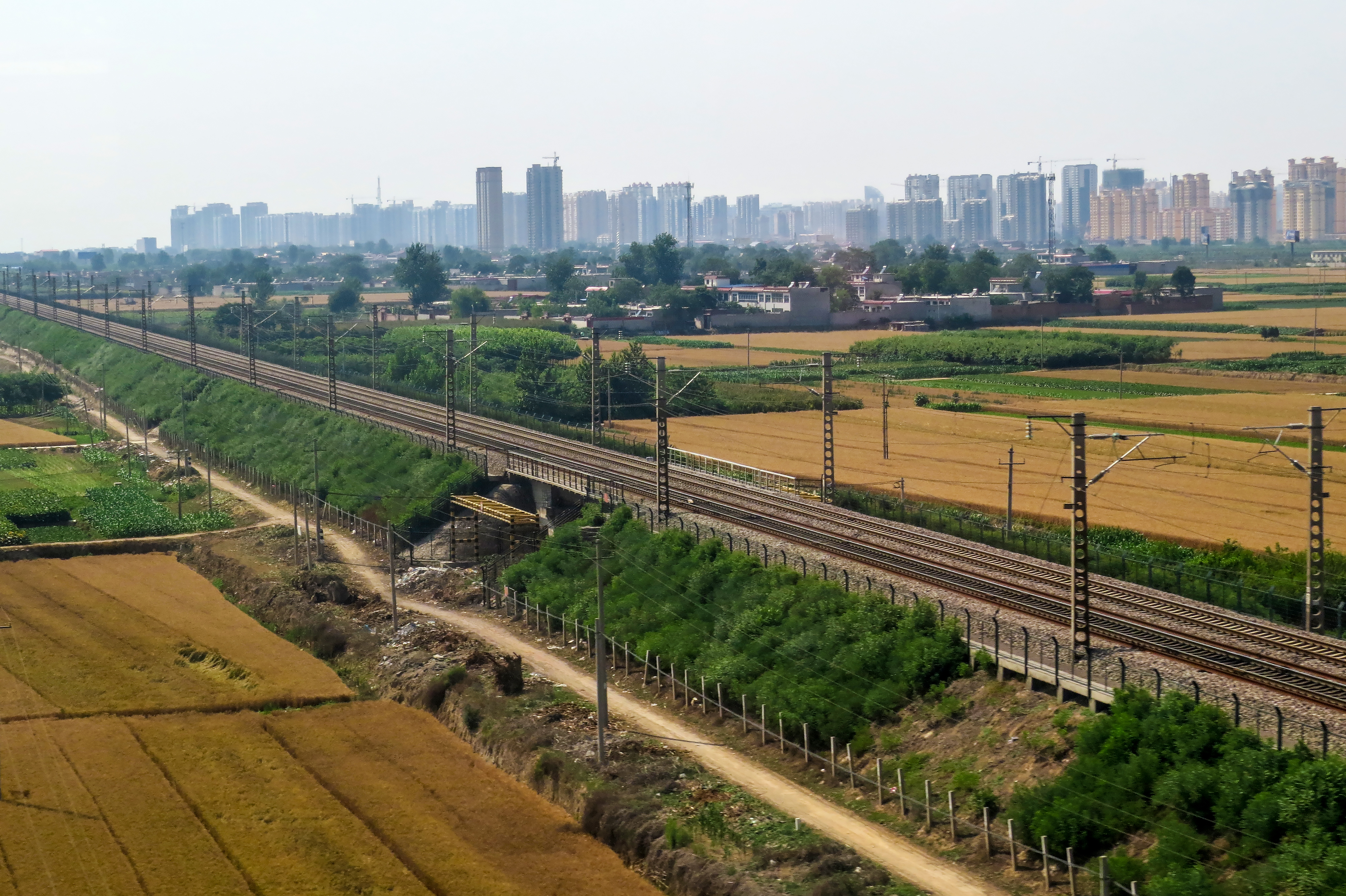
- Dingzhou skyline seen from Shuohuang Railway

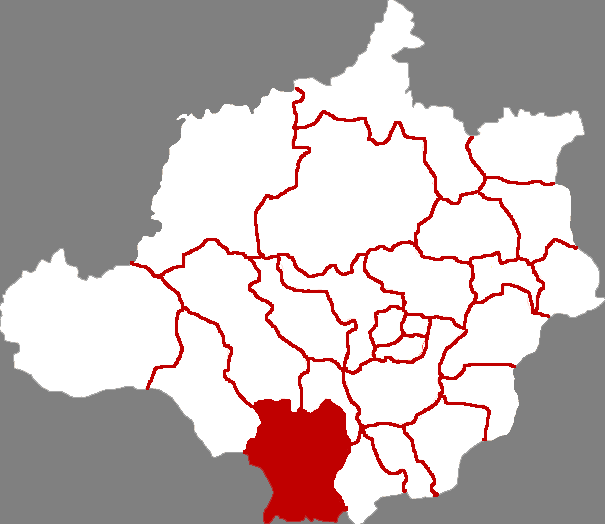
- Location in Baoding

- Location in Hebei
- Coordinates: 38°30′58″N 114°59′24″E
- Country: People's Republic of China
- Province: Hebei
- Prefecture-level city: Baoding

Area
  - County-level city: 1,283.7 km^{2} (495.6 sq mi)
  - Urban: 53.00 km^{2} (20.46 sq mi)
- Elevation: 58 m (190 ft)

Population (2020)
  - County-level city: 1,095,986
  - Density: 853.77/km^{2} (2,211.3/sq mi)
  - Urban: 577,440
- Time zone: UTC+8 (China Standard)
- Postal code: 073000
- Area code: 0312
- License Plate Prefix: 冀F
- Website: www.dingzhou.gov.cn

Dingzhou
- Chinese: 定州
- Postal: Tingchow
- Literal meaning: [Seat of] Ding ("Orderly") Prefecture
Transcriptions
Standard Mandarin
- Hanyu Pinyin: Dìngzhōu
- Wade–Giles: Ting-chou

Former names

Lunu
- Traditional Chinese: 廬奴
- Simplified Chinese: 庐奴
Transcriptions
Standard Mandarin
- Hanyu Pinyin: Lúnú
- Wade–Giles: Lu-nu

Boling
- Chinese: 博陵
Transcriptions
Standard Mandarin
- Hanyu Pinyin: Bólíng
- Wade–Giles: Po-ling

Anxi
- Chinese: 安喜
Transcriptions
Standard Mandarin
- Hanyu Pinyin: Ānxǐ
- Wade–Giles: An-hsi

Dingxian
- Traditional Chinese: 定縣
- Simplified Chinese: 定县
- Postal: Tingsien
Transcriptions
Standard Mandarin
- Hanyu Pinyin: Dìngxiàn
- Wade–Giles: Ting-hsien

Dingzhou, formerly romanized Tingchow and formerly known as Ding County or Dingxian, is a county-level city in the prefecture-level city of Baoding in Hebei Province, China. As of 2020, Dingzhou had a population of 1.1 million. Dingzhou has 3 subdistricts, 13 towns, 8 townships, and 1 ethnic township. Dingzhou is about halfway between Baoding and Shijiazhuang, 196 kilometers (122 mi) southwest of Beijing, and 68 kilometers (42 mi) northeast of Shijiazhuang.

== History ==
Dingzhou was originally known as Lunu in early imperial China. A tomb about 4 kilometers (2.5 mi) southwest of Dingzhou from 55–8 BCE was discovered and excavated in 1973. It contained several fragments of Han literature, including manuscripts of Confucius's Analects, the Taoist Wenzi, and the Six Secret Teachings, a military treatise. Four further manuscripts remain unpublished. The identity of the tomb's occupant is unknown, but Chinese archaeologists have speculated that it belonged to one of two kings of the Zhongshan fiefdom under the Former Han dynasty: either Liu Xiu or Liu Xing.

Dingzhou took its present name around 400 CE when it became the seat of Ding Prefecture under the Northern Wei, displacing the earlier An Prefecture. In the mid-6th century, its territory held 834,211 people living in 177,500 households. Under the Sui, the seat of Boling Commandery at present-day Anping was renamed "Gaoyang". In 607, Dingzhou then became the eponymous seat of a new Boling commandery and retained that name and status under the Tang until it returned to the name Dingzhou between 621 and 742 and again after 758. Its territory held only 86,869 people in 25,637 households in 639 but recovered to 496,676 people in 78,090 households by 742. As the seat of the often de facto independent jiedushi of Yiding Province, it was also known as Anxi and controlled three prefectures with only 27,401 households during the 813 census.

In 1055, under the Song, the city became the home of the 84-meter-tall (276 ft) Liaodi Pagoda, which is today China's tallest surviving pre-modern pagoda.

Under the early Republic, it was known as Dingxian (then romanized "Tingsien" or "Ting Hsien") from its status as the seat of Ding County. From 1926 to 1937, the county was the site of the National Association of Mass Education Movement's Ting Hsien Experiment of the Rural Reconstruction Movement. In the 1990s, the New Rural Reconstruction Movement maintained a training and outreach center.

== Administrative divisions ==
Towns:

- Qingfengdian (清风店镇), Dongting (东亭镇), Liqingu (李亲顾镇), Mingyuedian (明月店镇), Daxinzhuang (大辛庄镇), Xingyi (邢邑镇), Zhuanlu (砖路镇), Liuzao (留早镇), Pangcun (庞村镇), Gaopeng (高蓬镇), Ziwei (子位镇), Dingningdian (叮咛店镇), Dongwang (东旺镇), Kaiyuan (开元镇)

Townships:

- Dongliuchun Township (东留春乡), Zhoucun Township (周村乡), Daluzhuang Township (大鹿庄乡), Yangjiazhuang Township (杨家庄乡), Zhaocun Township (赵村乡), Xicheng Township (西城乡), Xizhong Township (息塚乡), Haotouzhuang Hui Ethnic Township (号头庄回族乡)

== Climate ==
Climate data for Dingzhou, elevation 42 m (138 ft), (1991–2020 normals, extremes 1981–2010)
Month	Jan	Feb	Mar	Apr	May	Jun	Jul	Aug	Sep	Oct	Nov	Dec	Year
Record high °C (°F)	17.0 (62.6)	23.1 (73.6)	30.5 (86.9)	34.0 (93.2)	38.3 (100.9)	41.0 (105.8)	42.0 (107.6)	37.8 (100.0)	35.2 (95.4)	32.1 (89.8)	24.9 (76.8)	21.0 (69.8)	42.0 (107.6)
Mean daily maximum °C (°F)	2.9 (37.2)	7.0 (44.6)	14.2 (57.6)	21.4 (70.5)	27.2 (81.0)	31.6 (88.9)	31.9 (89.4)	30.3 (86.5)	26.5 (79.7)	20.0 (68.0)	10.9 (51.6)	4.3 (39.7)	19.0 (66.2)
Daily mean °C (°F)	−2.8 (27.0)	1.0 (33.8)	7.8 (46.0)	15.1 (59.2)	21.0 (69.8)	25.5 (77.9)	27.0 (80.6)	25.5 (77.9)	20.6 (69.1)	13.7 (56.7)	5.2 (41.4)	−0.9 (30.4)	13.2 (55.8)
Mean daily minimum °C (°F)	−7.4 (18.7)	−3.8 (25.2)	2.2 (36.0)	9.1 (48.4)	14.9 (58.8)	19.8 (67.6)	22.5 (72.5)	21.4 (70.5)	15.9 (60.6)	8.8 (47.8)	0.9 (33.6)	−5.0 (23.0)	8.3 (46.9)
Record low °C (°F)	−18.6 (−1.5)	−17.3 (0.9)	−8.5 (16.7)	−1.5 (29.3)	4.3 (39.7)	10.8 (51.4)	16.1 (61.0)	13.0 (55.4)	5.4 (41.7)	−3.1 (26.4)	−11.2 (11.8)	−19.5 (−3.1)	−19.5 (−3.1)
Average precipitation mm (inches)	2.2 (0.09)	4.8 (0.19)	9.1 (0.36)	23.5 (0.93)	33.0 (1.30)	57.8 (2.28)	142.6 (5.61)	113.2 (4.46)	47.5 (1.87)	24.2 (0.95)	12.0 (0.47)	2.0 (0.08)	471.9 (18.59)
Average precipitation days (≥ 0.1 mm)	1.6	2.4	2.8	4.7	6.1	8.3	11.4	10.3	6.9	4.8	3.3	1.7	64.3
Average snowy days	2.3	2.8	1.1	0.2	0	0	0	0	0	0	1.6	2.7	10.7
Average relative humidity (%)	55	51	49	53	57	61	75	79	74	68	65	58	62
Mean monthly sunshine hours	160.4	172.0	219.4	235.2	264.9	229.7	190.5	194.5	195.9	181.1	156.8	155.2	2,355.6
Percentage possible sunshine	53	56	59	59	60	52	42	47	53	53	53	53	53
Source: China Meteorological Administration

== Transportation ==
Dingzhou is one of the transportation hubs in North China.

=== Railroads ===
- Jingguang railway: Dingzhou Railway Station
- Jingshi Passenger Railway: Dingzhou East Railway Station
- Shuohuang Railway: Dingzhou South Railway Station

=== Highways ===
- Jingshi Expressway
- China National Highway 107

== Places of interest ==
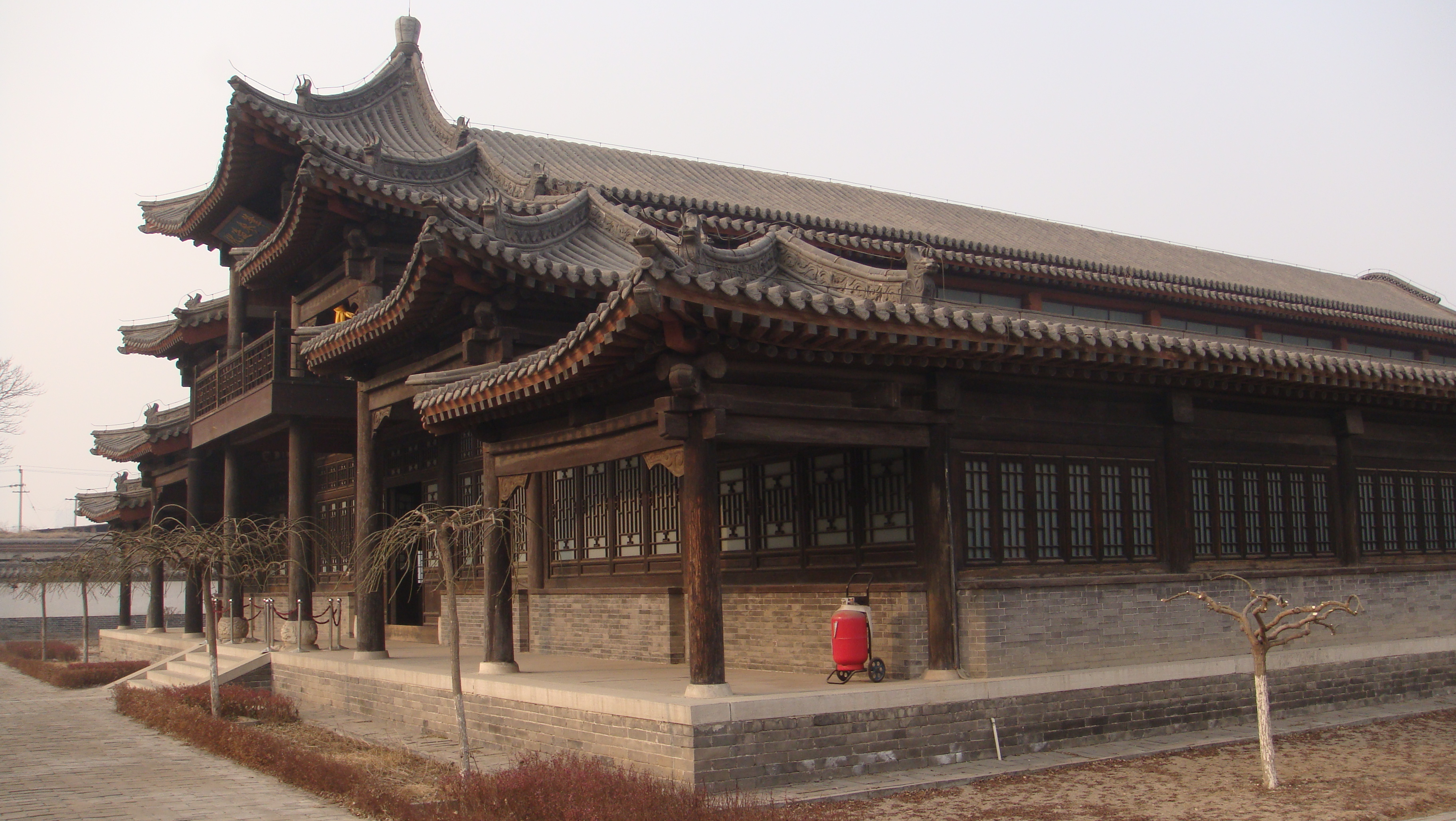
Dingzhou Gongyuan

- Liaodi Pagoda: The tallest existing pre-modern Chinese pagoda
- Dingzhou Confucius Temple: A well-preserved Confucius temple in Hebei

== See also ==
- Shengyou, a village in Dingzhou
