= List of Xenoctenidae species =

This page lists all described species of the spider family Xenoctenidae accepted by the World Spider Catalog as of January 2021:

== Incasoctenus ==
Incasoctenus Mello-Leitão, 1942

- I. perplexus Mello-Leitão, 1942 (type) — Peru

== Odo ==
Odo Keyserling, 1887

- O. abudi Alayón, 2002 — Hispaniola
- O. agilis Simon, 1897 — St. Thomas
- O. ariguanabo Alayón, 1995 — Cuba
- O. australiensis Hickman, 1944 — Central Australia
- O. blumenauensis Mello-Leitão, 1927 — Brazil
- O. bruchi (Mello-Leitão, 1938) — Argentina
- O. cubanus (Franganillo, 1946) — Cuba
- O. desenderi Baert, 2009 — Ecuador (Galapagos Is.)
- O. drescoi (Caporiacco, 1955) — Venezuela
- O. galapagoensis Banks, 1902 — Ecuador (Galapagos Is.)
- O. gigliolii Caporiacco, 1947 — Guyana
- O. incertus Caporiacco, 1955 — Venezuela
- O. insularis Banks, 1902 — Ecuador (Galapagos Is.)
- O. keyserlingi Kraus, 1955 — El Salvador
- O. lenis Keyserling, 1887 (type) — Nicaragua
- O. limitatus Gertsch & Davis, 1940 — Mexico
- O. lycosoides (Chamberlin, 1916) — Peru
- O. maelfaiti Baert, 2009 — Ecuador (Galapagos Is.)
- O. obscurus Mello-Leitão, 1936 — Brazil
- O. patricius Simon, 1900 — Peru, Chile
- O. pulcher Keyserling, 1891 — Brazil
- O. roseus (Mello-Leitão, 1941) — Argentina
- O. sericeus (Mello-Leitão, 1944) — Argentina
- O. serrimanus Mello-Leitão, 1936 — Brazil
- O. similis Keyserling, 1891 — Brazil
- O. tulum Alayón, 2003 — Mexico
- O. vittatus (Mello-Leitão, 1936) — Brazil

== Paravulsor ==
Paravulsor Mello-Leitão, 1922

- P. impudicus Mello-Leitão, 1922 (type) — Brazil

== Xenoctenus ==
Xenoctenus Mello-Leitão, 1938

- X. marmoratus Mello-Leitão, 1941 — Argentina
- X. pampeanus Mello-Leitão, 1940 — Argentina
- X. patagonicus Mello-Leitão, 1940 — Argentina
- X. unguiculatus Mello-Leitão, 1938 (type) — Argentina
