= Brough, Caithness =

Village in Caithness, Scotland

Coordinates: 58.641°N 3.341°W

Brough
- Village
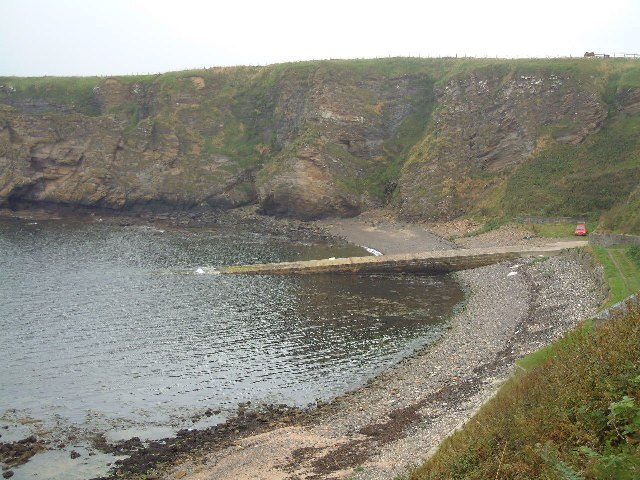
- Brough Slipway

- Location within the Caithness area
- Population: 72 Scotland Census 2011
- OS grid reference: ND222733
- Civil parish: Dunnet
- Council area: Highland
- Lieutenancy area: Caithness
- Country: Scotland
- Sovereign state: United Kingdom
- Post town: THURSO
- Postcode district: KW14
- Dialling code: 01847
- Police: Scotland
- Fire: Scottish
- Ambulance: Scottish
- UK Parliament: Caithness, Sutherland and Easter Ross
- Scottish Parliament: Caithness, Sutherland and Ross constituency in the Highlands and Islands electoral region

Brough /brɒx/ is a small village in Caithness on the far north coast of mainland Scotland. It is the most northerly village of mainland Great Britain. It is 10 miles (16 km) east of Thurso, 20 miles (32 km) north-west of Wick, 200 miles (320 km) north of Edinburgh, and 500 miles (800 km) north of London. It is on the southern shore of the Pentland Firth, the sea channel between Caithness and the Orkney Islands, notorious for strong tidal currents and exceptionally violent sea conditions. Brough is located on the B855 single-track road, 2.5 miles (4 km) south east of Dunnet Head Lighthouse, the most northerly lighthouse and point on mainland Britain. The neighbouring village of Dunnet and the wide sandy beaches of Dunnet Bay lie 1.6 miles (2.6 km) to the south. Brough is within the civil parish of Dunnet. John o' Groats, the north-easterly point of the mainland, lies 10 miles (16 km) to the east.

Brough is the site of Brough Castle, a twelfth-century Norse fortress; the ruins are on the property now known as Heathcliff.

In 2011, the village had a population of 72. The village has a bus stop and had a village post office and tea room, now closed. Brough harbour, a small cliff-enclosed shingle bay to the north of the village, faces Little Clett rock, an islet which shelters the harbour from the north. The slipway was originally built to assist the construction and maintenance of Dunnet Head lighthouse (1831). The harbour is quite sheltered, but is surrounded by the notorious, powerful currents of the Pentland Firth and the rocky cliffs of Dunnet Head. A second harbour is located at Ham, at the eastern end of the village.

To the south of the village lies St. John's Loch, which supports large, beautifully marked specimen brown trout. The surrounding countryside is wild, largely treeless and dominated by peat bog and small crofting farmsteads.

In 2014, Oscar-winning actress Tilda Swinton was in Brough filming a short film Special sets the standard for the 2015 Mercedes-Benz S-Class Coupe. Brough Harbour provided the backdrop for the film, which was noted for its mysterious atmosphere and raw beauty.The campaign was produced by MoMA-featured photographer and director Roe Ethridge, designer Haider Ackermann, and cameraman Andre Chemetoff.

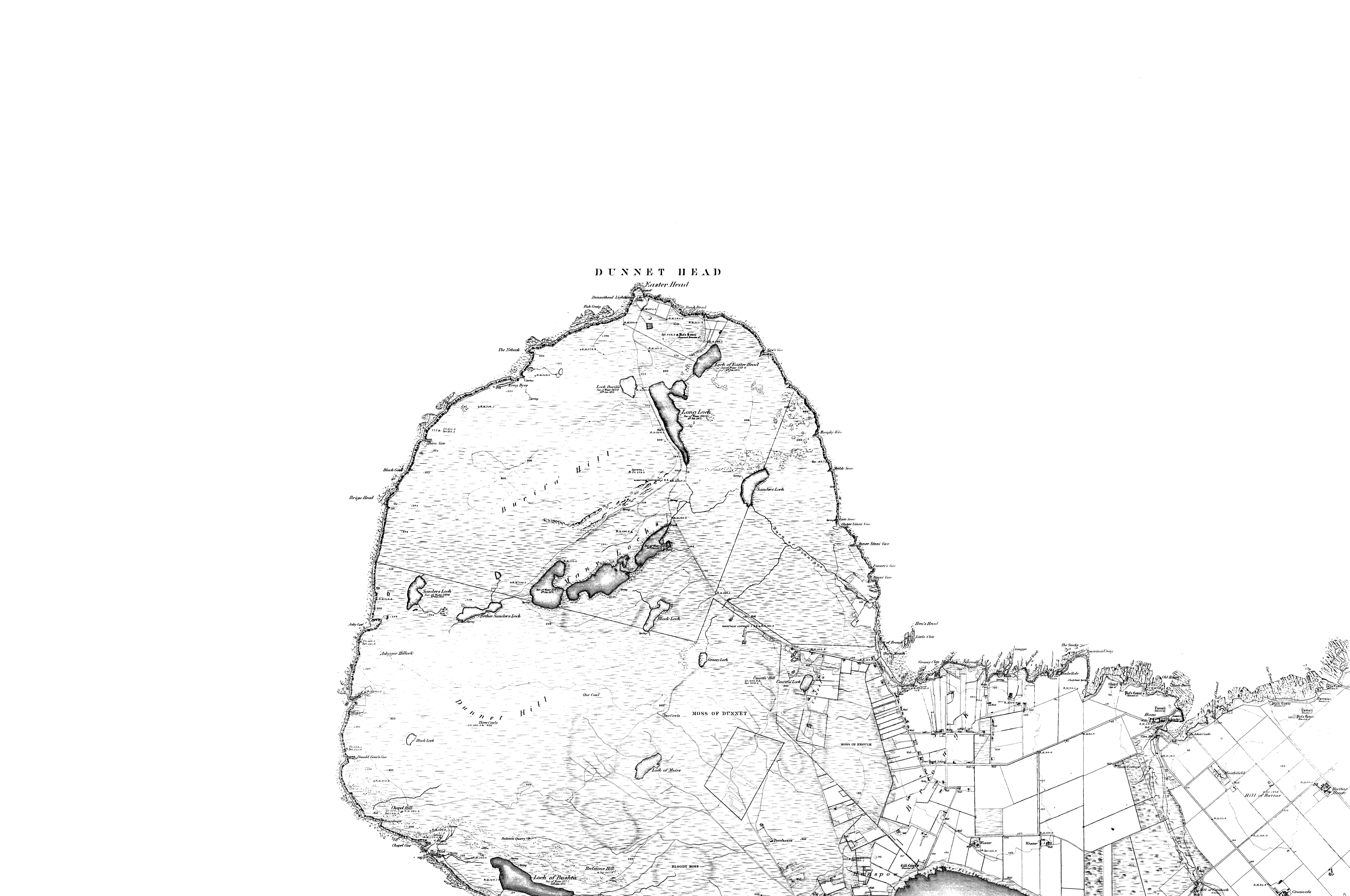
Ordnance Survey 1876 - 1878, Map of Caithness-shire Sheet 001

== Name ==
The name Brough is pronounced to rhyme with the Scottish word loch (in contrast to the English town of Brough, which is pronounced to rhyme with rough)

Brough is named after the Broch, a type of ancient Pictish defensive homestead. Various spellings of the name have been recorded, including Brughe (1546), Bruche (1592), Brugh (1662), and Burgh (1753). The remains of a number of brochs are found in the area around the village.

== Landscape and setting ==
Brough sits on a gently-sloping plain, rising from St Johns Loch in the south to the coastal cliffs in the north. The highest point of the village is around 40m elevation near the cross-roads. The high moorland and peat bog of Dunnet Head are dominant to the west. There is much wild and beautiful (if somewhat sparse) scenery, with views to the south across St John's Loch and Dunnet all the way to the mountains of Morven and Scaraben, 30 miles to the south, on a clear day. There are fine sea views from the north of the village across the Pentland Firth to the Orkney island of Hoy, Flotta and Stroma, amongst others. One of the most distinctive features of the area is the almost-complete lack of trees and woodland. Storm-force winter winds and wind-carried salt make it a harsh climate for trees to develop; those that do tend to be limited in height. The resulting landscape could be described as "open" although some might find it bleak.

== History and archaeology ==
Caithness has many archaeological sites, of which some have been dated to the Neolithic, and there is evidence of widespread habitation from that era onward. Dunnet Head is documented (as Tarvedrum) in Roman-era maps of the 2nd century Ptolemy and Roman artifacts have been found at Crosskirk near Thurso.

Dated physical evidence of pre-Viking settlement in the village is sparse; a number of sites are identified as Pictish, including brochs and the chambered cairns at Ham. There are few dated artifacts, although articles of Bronze Age or earlier have been found nearby. Human skulls from a chambered cairn near Ham were radiocarbon dated to around 3000BC. There are definite Viking sites at Ham and further east of the village, with silver jewellery dated to 1000AD found at Kirk O'Banks just east of the village.

These sites have been linked with events and locations in the 12th century Orkneyinga Saga, mentioning a Viking sea battle off Randaborg which may refer to Dunnet Head:

Three mounds about 4 or 5 feet in height shaped like inverted boats. Society of Antiquaries of Scotland [member] Mr Anderson pronounced them to be Norse Ship-grave-hills sometimes called 'ship-barrows'. Mr Anderson says: 'It is related in the 15th Chapter of the Orkneyinga Saga, that a bloody sea-fight took place in the year 1046 off the Caithness coast, when Earl Thorfinn, who then lived at Gills, opposed the landing of his nephew, Ronald Brusison, who came over from Orkney with thirty ships. Thorfinn had sixty ships, but Ronald's were much larger; and Thorfinn getting the worst of it, was obliged to draw to land; before he renewed the battle in which he was finally victorious, it is said that he landed 76 dead men, besides his wounded. Of course, the dead that were thus landed wd [would] be buried there. The locality of the fight is said in the "Saga" to have been off Randaboirg the Red Headland, or Red Borg, and it is only in the [neighbourhood] of Dunnet Head that the red beds of the Old Red Sandstone occur.

In the 17th century, the Sinclair family, notable local landholders and nobility, leased out land in and around Brough:

WALTER BRUCE OF HAM, third son of Saul Bruce of Lyth, obtained, in 1636, from James Sinclair of Rattar, a wadset of Ham and Wester: and in 1647 he got a wadset of Brough from William Sinclair of Rattar. In 1663 the Earl of Caithness gave him a charter of these lands, confirming to him and his heirs "an irredeemable bond of alienation".

— Caithness Family History

The current road to the village (the B855) was only constructed in around 1880, it is absent from the Ordnance Survey maps of 1878. Prior to this time, transit between the village and Dunnet (and further afield) was via a boggy footpath around the western end of the loch. The community would have been very isolated, and transit by boat would have been more convenient (from Brough harbour), but would have meant braving the tidal currents of the Firth.

In 1810 the village was noted as "one of the best fishing stations on the coast of Caithness".

== Social history ==
Crofting and fishing have been the mainstay of livelihoods for the village, probably for its entire history, and continue to be central to the community. Many small farms make up the village, and the architecture is that of the classic Scottish croft-house; land division and usage is that of crofting. Livestock (sheep and cattle) crops (potatoes, turnips, oats), and common peat cuttings are still evident. Turf roofs have been replaced with slate or corrugated steel, but the buildings and their layout are essentially the same since the Highland Clearances. The majority of homes and land-holdings in the village (approximately 47) are officially registered as crofts.

Even in the early 20th century, cave-dwelling was noted at Kunk's Hole, a cave in the cliffs near the village.

== Geology ==
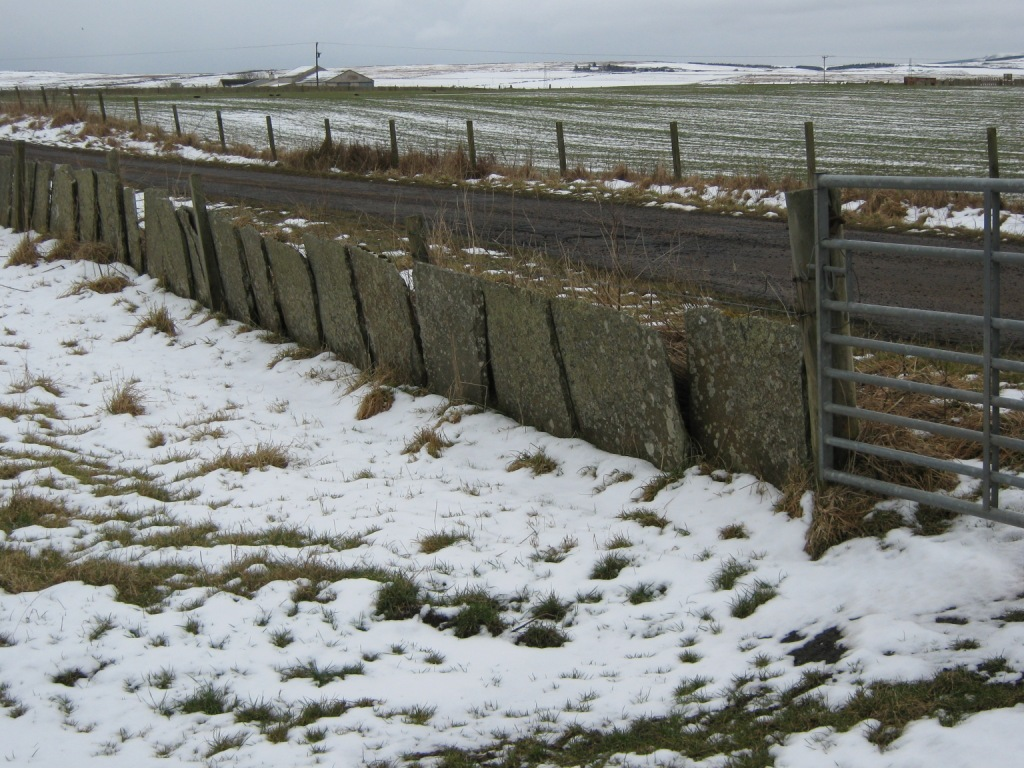
Caithness flagstone fencing

Brough lies within the Orcadian Basin geological region, at the boundary between the Upper Devonian Old Red Sandstone to the west, which makes up the dramatic red cliffs of Dunnet Head, and the Caithness Flagstone Group to the east and south, which has formed a lower topography. A geological fault, the Brough Fault runs south from Brough approximately along the route of the B855 separating the hill and moorland of Dunnet Head from the lower-lying fields and farms to the east. The fault can be seen at Brough harbour, along with volcanic vents from the relic volcano at the edge of the village. The Old Red Sandstone is of the Eday Group, and is shared with the island of Hoy, whereas the Caithness flagstone is of the Ham-Scarfskerry subgroup.

This local stone is used in the characteristic Caithness flagstone fencing, which is unusual in its construction in that the stones are erected vertically to form a barrier rather than the more common horizontally-laid construction of drystone walling). It also contributes to the vertically laid construction of Ham harbour and Castletown harbour.

== Natural environment ==
The coastline to the north of the village comprises exposed cliff and rocky foreshore with numerous small caves and inlets, providing nesting sites for sea birds. The cliffs near the village are designated a Site of Special Scientific Interest for their unique habitat, coastal flora and nesting seabirds:

Maritime cliff (vegetation)

Maritime cliff vegetation grows in a narrow strip along the cliff tops and on some of the cliff ledges. Species-rich maritime heath grows in a mosaic with maritime grassland on the cliff tops. Key species of the maritime heath are heather Calluna vulgaris, bell heather Erica cinerea, crowberry Empetrum nigrum, creeping willow Salix repens and bird's-foot-trefoil Lotus corniculatus. Typical maritime grassland species include red fescue Festuca rubra, thrift Armeria maritima, ribwort plantain Plantago lanceolata, devil's-bit scabious Succisa pratensis, angelica Angelica sylvestris and spring squill Scilla verna. The cliff ledges support a range of plant species which thrive close to the sea. These include plants such as Scots lovage Ligusticum scoticum, sea campion Silene uniflora, angelica Angelica sylvestris, red campion Silene dioica, roseroot Sedum rosea and primrose Primula vulgaris.

Seabird colony

More than 10,000 pairs of seabirds nest in the crevices and ledges of the cliffs, making this site of national importance for breeding seabirds. The seabird colony includes large numbers of guillemot Uria aalge and kittiwake Rissa tridactyla, as well as fulmar Fulmarus glacialis, razorbill Alca torda, puffin Fratercula arctica, shag Phalacrocorax aristotelis, cormorant Phalacrocorax carbo, herring gull Larus argentatus and great black-backed gull L. marinus.

Guillemot

Large numbers of guillemot, representing more than 1% of the UK population, breed on the cliffs of Dunnet Head.

— Dunnet Head SSSI.

The village and the area are popular with ornithologists, providing opportunities to see puffins (at Brough harbour) along with razorbills, guillemots, fulmars, kittiwakes and great northern divers.

Grey seal can regularly be seen at Brough harbour, and Orca and other whales and dolphins are seen in the Pentland Firth beyond the harbour. The village houses a Seal Rescue and Release Sanctuary.

The unique habitats in the area support rare and endemic plant species, including Primula Scotica. The rare Narrow small reed Calamagrostis stricta is found on the west bank of St John's Loch, and in 2003 a new species of Horsetail was found there.

== Community ==
The community of Brough includes families who have lived in the village and the surrounding area for many generations (as attested by the characteristic Caithness surnames) and "incomers", many of whom moved to the area during the Dounreay era and settled, raising families of their own. Masson describes the challenges facing young adults in Caithness, and the sometimes antagonistic relationship with "incomers".

Recently there has been an influx of retirees and tourism has led to an increase in second homes and holiday rentals. The limited employment prospects for young adults has led to a falling young population. Many have moved away for work, or are employed in Thurso or Wick. In the village, a few Rural crafts continue to provide income, amongst them weaving, wood-turning and other crafts. Tourism brings many to the village, to see Dunnet Head as a detour on their way to John O'Groats or touring on the NC500. The Brough Bay Association is a community group which maintains the slipway and other infrastructure at Brough Harbour, holds events, and has created an archives of social history of the village. In the 19th Century, Brough had its own school (the "Free Church School", attached to the Free Church of Scotland, also known as Brough Academy. The village was renowned for its seafarers and had the nickname "Village of Captains" for the number of successful maritime captains it had raised.

The village was evacuated on 19 March 1999 as a precaution when the tanker Multitank Ascania, carrying a dangerous cargo of 2700 tonnes of Vinyl acetate monomer suffered a severe fire and risk of explosion as it drifted out of control in "extraordinarily severe" seas in the Pentland Firth.

== Agriculture ==
Brough has fertile soils with a high peat content, making them somewhat acidic, tending to sandy nearer the coast, and occasionally affected by salinity. High rainfall and a clay pan leads to generally high water content and a predisposition to waterlogging. Many fields have only become cultivatable once improved by drainage.

Cattle and sheep are successfully raised in and around the village; Wester farm (the largest in the village) has delivered prizewinning sheep, and prizewinning sheepdogs also. Hardy breeds (of both cattle and sheep)) are preferable; Highland cattle and Cheviot sheep are common choices. Mey farm (attached to the Castle of Mey) supplies prizewinning beef from its pedigree cattle. The previous livestock market at Thurso has now closed, and livestock are transported to the market at Dingwall for sale.

Potatoes, oats, cabbage and turnips grow well, some area of land around the village is laid to arable for these crops. Silage and hay are also produced, however drying of hay is challenging some summers given the damp climate, and generally only one cut a year is achievable. Few fruit grow outside greenhouse or polytunnel, of those that do, gooseberries, black currant and raspberry are most successful. The relatively few hours of sunshine can make ripening a problem for some fruit. Winters are relatively mild, but windy.

== Education ==
Primary education is provided at Crossroads Primary School, just to the east of the village. Secondary students travel to Thurso High School daily by bus.

== Transport ==
A direct bus service runs to Thurso three times a day, connecting to Thurso Railway Station. Ferries to Orkney operate from Scrabster by NorthLink Ferries and from Gills Bay, by Pentland Ferries.

== Events and attractions ==
An annual music festival, "Tunes by the Dunes" is held nearby, in Dunnet. The Mey Highland Games are a nearby annual event, now held at John O'Groats. In previous years, Queen Elizabeth The Queen Mother attended to give prizes, while staying at the Castle of Mey.

== Notable people ==
Captain George Johnston

George Johnson was born in Brough in 1811, but tragically his mother died when he was 18 months old and when his father remarried, his step-mother treated the children very badly, so George and his brother were often starved and punished. At the age of 7 his uncle took compassion on him and kept him on his vessel, the 'Betsey' of Thurso, where he lived until 1822. A series of assorted vessels followed and he eventually became an apprentice, completing a voyage around the Horn in 1834. Long voyages enabled him to save some money to pay for attendance at navigation school and he qualified in every aspect of the subject, and doubtless returned to Brough several times, as he married in 1838 Mary Ann Johnston in Edinburgh. Progress in his career continued, with voyages to the Antipodes and East Indies until he became chief mate with Captain Cowan of the barque, 'Tory' in 1840.

The 'Tory' sailed from Liverpool on 24th January 1844, bound for Bombay with general cargo and a company of soldiers and officers of the 22nd regiment under the command of Captain Anderson for services in India. Unfortunately, during the voyage across the Indian Ocean, Captain Cowan died, leaving the navigation and ship handling to George Johnston; as task which he fulfilled competently to a safe arrival in Bombay, and glowing reports from the passengers enabled the owners to promote Johnston to be Captain of the vessel for the remainder of the voyage.

With an epidemic of cholera in Bombay, Captain Johnston lost some of his crew but sailed on with a cargo of opium and cotton to Singapore and Canton, and then to Shanghai and Hong Kong, obtaining valuable cargo at each port, but where he was forced to engage a new mate and crew from the dregs of humanity which that port was only too glad to get rid of from their jails. It was inevitable that with such officers and crew, and a valuable cargo, trouble would break out on the long voyage home as the villains plotted to take the ship to the Americas, culminating in fighting and the death of the mate who jumped overboard and was lost.

Following the safe arrival of the ship in London, the Captain was accused of murder by the criminal elements of the crew and overwhelming evidence given by them brought a verdict of guilty against Captain Johnston.

Just where he was incarcerated in London, I do not know, but I don't think it would be in the Tower! Poor soul, it must have been a terrible blow to him to be so falsely accused with no hope of appeal in those days and at the age of 70 we find him in a workhouse in Battersea and surely could not have been lived much longer. I have a date of 1888 but research is required.

— Danny Begg - Stories from Brough

George Johnston is recorded in the admission records for Bethlem, the notorious London asylum, admitted on 23 February 1846, received from Newgate Prison under sentence for murder by the Central Criminal Court, recorded as "insane". It is noted that 16 March 1864 he was "removed to Broadmoor". He is featured in a portrait by photographer Henry Hering (1814 - 1893), noted as a merchant ship captain. This photograph is part of a series of portraits of patients at Bethlem. It is notable that the photograph is dated 1857 - 1859; George Johnston would have been around 38 years of age, and would already have been incarcerated for around eleven years at the time it was taken.
