= ODO =

Odo or ODO may refer to:

== People ==
- Odo, a given name; includes a list of people and fictional characters with the name
- Franklin Odo (1939–2022), Japanese-American historian
- Seikichi Odo (1927–2002), Japanese karateka
- Yuya Odo (born 1990), Japanese rugby union player

== Sport ==
- Ōdō Tournament, a Japanese professional wrestling competition
- ODO Riga, a defunct sports club in Riga, Latvian SSR
- FC CSKA Kyiv, formerly ODO Kyiv, a Ukrainian football club
- SC Odesa, formerly ODO Odesa, a Ukrainian football club
- SKA Lviv, formerly ODO Lviv, a Ukrainian football club

== Other uses ==
- Odo (restaurant), a Michelin-starred restaurant in New York City
- "Odo" (song), a 2021 song by Ado
- Odo (spider), a genus of spiders
- Odo Dam, a dam in Kōchi Prefecture, Japan
- Odessa-Schlemeyer Field, which has the FAA identifier ODO
- Bodaybo Airport (IATA code), Irkutsk Oblast, Russia
- Oxford Dictionaries Online, now Lexico, a dictionary website
- ODO, a 2008 EP by the Funeral Orchestra
- Odo (TV series), Irish-Polish-American animated television series
- Odometer
