= Dunnet (disambiguation) =

Dunnet is a village in Caithness, Scotland

Dunnet may also refer to:

== Places ==
- Dunnet's Corner, settlement in Markstay-Warren, Ontario, Canada
- Dunnet Forest, community woodland in Caithness
- Dunnet Head, the most northerly point of the Scottish mainland

== People ==
- Desmond Dunnet (1913-1980), New Zealand cricketer
- George Dunnet (1928-1995), Scottish ornithologist and ecologist

== Other uses ==
- Dunnet (video game), text adventure game
- SS Empire Dunnet, British cargo ship built in 1945, later known as Clan Mackinnon

== See also ==
- Dunnett
