= Ocean Chief =

Ocean Chief may refer to:

== Ships ==
- Ocean Chief (clipper), a clipper ship at the time of the Australian gold rushes 1854–1861
- USS Alstede, ordered as SS Ocean Chief in 1944
- Ocean Chief, a shipwreck in May 1875 in Fintry Bay, Argyllshire, Scotland

== Other uses ==
- Ocean Chief, a Swedish band associated with The Funeral Orchestra
- Ocean Chief, in whale worship, a name for whales in many Chinese cultures
