= Odo of Troyes =

Odo of Troyes may refer to:

- Odo I of Troyes (died 871)
- Odo II of Troyes (fl. 876)
- Odo of Champagne (died 1115)
