= Eudes =

Eudes, French for Odo, may refer to:

== Given name ==
- Odo the Great (died 735–740), Duke of Acquitaine
- Odo I, Count of Orléans (died 834)
- Odo I of Troyes (died 871)
- Odo II of Troyes, Count of Troyes from 877 to 879
- Odo I of Beauvais (died 881), Abbot of Corbie and Bishop of Beauvais
- Odo of France (c. 857–898), King of Western Francia
- Odo of Toulouse (died 919)
- Odo I of Blois (c. 950–996)
- Otto, Count of Vermandois (979–1045)
- Odo II of Blois (983–1037)
- Odo, Count of Penthièvre (c. 999–1079), also Count of Brittany
- Eudes, birth name of Pope Urban II (c. 1035–1099)
- Odo of Champagne (c. 1040–1115)
- Odo I of Burgundy (1060–1102)
- Odo II of Beauvais (died 1144), Bishop of Beauvais
- Odo III of Beauvais (died 1148 or 1149), Bishop of Beauvais
- Odo II, Viscount of Porhoët (died 1170), second husband of Bertha, Duchess of Brittany, and her consort
- Odo of St Amand (1110–1180), Grand Master of the Knights Templar
- Eudes Archambaud, 12th century French noble, Lord of Sully
- Eudes de Sully (died 1208), Bishop of Paris
- Odo III of Burgundy (1166–1218)
- Eudes II, Lord of Ham (died 1234)
- Odo of Nevers (1230–1266)
- Eudes de Lorris (died 1274), Bishop of Bayeux
- Odon de Pins (died 1296), Grand Master of the Knights Hospitaller
- Odo IV of Burgundy (1295–1349)
- Eudes Dagoulou (born 1990), Central African Republic footballer
- Eudes (footballer), Brazilian football midfielder Eudes Lacerda Medeiros (born 1955)

== Surname ==
- Émile Eudes (1843–1888), French revolutionary and socialist
- John Eudes (1601–1680), founder of the Eudists, a religious order of the Roman Catholic Church
- Raymond Eudes (1912–1980), French Canadian lawyer and politician
- Vitor Eudes (born 1998), Brazilian football goalkeeper

== See also ==
- Eudo, a related given name
- Odo (disambiguation)
