= Odo =

Odo is a name typically associated with historical figures from the Middle Ages and before. Odo is etymologically related to the names Otho and Otto, and to the French name Odon and modern version Eudes, and to the Italian names Ottone and Udo; all come from the Germanic word ot meaning "possessor of wealth".

== Historical ==
=== Nobility ===
- Odo the Great (died c. 735), Duke of Aquitaine
- Odo I, Count of Orléans (died 834)
- Odo I of Troyes (died 871)
- Odo II of Troyes (held the title in 876)
- Odo of France (860–898), King of the Franks
- Odo of Toulouse (died 918 or 919), Count of Toulouse
- Odo of Fézensac (died 985), Count of Fézensac
- Odo I of Blois (950–996)
- Odo I, Margrave of the Saxon Ostmark (died 993)
- Odo II of Blois (983–1037)
- Odo II, Margrave of the Saxon Ostmark (died 1046)
- Odo of Dammartin (died after 1061)
- Odo, Count of Penthièvre (c. 999–1079), co-Duke of Brittany
- Odo I of Burgundy (1060–1102)
- Odo of Champagne (c. 1040–1115)
- Odo II of Burgundy (1118–1162), Duke of Brittany
- Odo I, Viscount of Porhoët
- Odo II, Viscount of Porhoët (died after 1180)
- Odo II of Champlitte (died in 1204)

=== Clerics ===
- Odo of Glanfeuil (fl. 850s–860s, abbot and hagiographer
- Odo I of Beauvais (died 881), West Frankish abbot and bishop
- Odo of Cluny (c. 878–942), Roman Catholic saint
- Odo of Arezzo (fl. late 10th century), composer and theorist
- Odo (or Oda) of Canterbury (died 958), Archbishop of Canterbury
- Odo of Bayeux (died 1097), brother of William the Conqueror, Bishop of Bayeux and Earl of Kent
- Odo of Cambrai (1050–1113), Benedictine monk and bishop
- Odo of Urgell (died 1122), saint and bishop of Urgell
- Odo II of Beauvais (died 1144), bishop of Beauvais
- Odo de St Amand (1110–1179), Grand Master of the Knights Templar
- Odo of Deuil, 12th-century historian and crusader
- Odo of Canterbury (died 1200), saint and abbot of Battle
- Odo of Novara (c. 1105–1200), Carthusian monk
- Odo of Châteauroux (c. 1190–1273), French cardinal
- Odo of Cheriton (c. 1185–1246/47), Roman Catholic priest and fabulist
- Pope Martin V (1368–1431), born Odo or Oddone Colonna
- Odo O'Driscoll, bishop of Ross, Ireland (1473-1494)

== Modern ==
- Odo Casel (1886–1948), also known as Johannes Casel, German Catholic theologian and monk
- Odo Hirsch (born 1962), Australian author
- Odo Marquard (1928–2015), German philosopher
- Odo Reuter (1850–1913), Swedo-Finnish zoologist and poet
- Odo Russell, 1st Baron Ampthill (1829–1884), British diplomat

== Fictional characters ==
- Odo (Star Trek), a shapeshifter in the science fiction series Star Trek: Deep Space Nine portrayed by René Auberjonois.
- Odo, an obscure background character in Pixar's Win or Lose who loves to drink orange soda and give unsolicited and creepy advice to others. His name is also short for "Orange Drink Oracle."
- Odo Proudfoot, a cousin of Bilbo Baggins from the fantasy novel The Lord of the Rings.
- Odo Stevens, an Army officer, journalist, and author from Anthony Powell's A Dance to the Music of Time novel sequence.
- Odo, founder of an anarchist political movement in Ursula K. Le Guin's science fiction novel The Dispossessed and her short story "The Day Before the Revolution."
- Odo or Ooth, a name allegedly corrupted into Hood in the claim that Robert Fitzooth was Robin Hood.

== See also ==
- Eudes (disambiguation)
- Oda (disambiguation)
