= Dunnett =

Dunnett is a surname. Notable people with the surname include:

- Sir Alastair Dunnett (1908–1998), Scottish journalist and newspaper editor, husband of Dorothy Dunnett
- Charles Dunnett (1921–2007), Canadian statistician
- Dorothy Dunnett (1923–2001), Scottish historical novelist, wife of Alastair Dunnett
- Jack Dunnett (1922–2019), British politician
- Sir James Dunnett (1914–1997), British civil servant
- Sir James Macdonald Dunnett (1877–1953), Indian civil servant
- Jonathan Dunnett (born 1974), British adventurer, windsurfing the mainland coastline of Europe
- Nigel Dunnett (1962–2026), British horticulturalist and academic
- Stephen Dunnett (born 1950), British neuroscientist

== See also ==
- Dennett, surname
- Marvin Dunnette, American psychologist
- Dunnet, village in Caithness, Scotland
- Dunnet (disambiguation)
