= 1948–49 Klass B season =

The 1948–49 Klass B season was the second season of the Klass B, the second level of ice hockey in the Soviet Union. 12 teams participated in the league, and Lokomotiv Moscow won the championship. Lokomotiv, Dynamo Sverdlovsk, and SKIF Leningrad were promoted to the Soviet Championship League.

== First round ==
=== Central Zone ===
	Club	GP	W	T	L	GF	GA	Pts
1.	Lokomotiv Moscow	12	8	3	1	34	20	19
2.	SKIF Leningrad	12	6	3	3	37	18	15
3.	ODO Leningrad	12	5	3	4	31	31	13
4.	HC Spartak Minsk	12	5	3	4	22	29	13
5.	Spartak Leningrad	12	4	1	7	23	27	9
6.	Savod GOMS Leningrad	12	3	2	7	27	38	8
7.	ODO Riga	12	3	1	8	28	37	7

=== Eastern Zone ===
	Club	GP	W	T	L	GF	GA	Pts
1.	Dynamo Sverdlovsk	8	8	0	0	80	14	16
2.	Spartak Voronezh	8	5	1	2	32	29	11
3.	HK Molotov	8	3	0	5	22	35	6
4.	Dzerzchinez Nizhny Tagil	8	1	2	5	18	51	4
5.	Torpedo Gorky	8	1	1	6	25	46	3

== Final tournament ==
	Club	GP	W	T	L	GF	GA	Pts
1.	Lokomotiv Moscow	3	3	0	0	17	6	6
2.	Dynamo Sverdlovsk	3	2	0	1	16	9	4
3.	SKIF Leningrad	3	1	0	2	9	10	2
4.	Spartak Voronezh	3	0	0	3	3	20	0
