= Robert I of Troyes =

Robert I (died October 886), called Porte-carquois, was the Count of Troyes. He was a son of Odo I, Count of Troyes, and Wandilmodis.

Lay abbot of Saint-Loup, he was mentioned for the first time on 25 October 874, when he appeared in a charter of Charles the Bald ceding Chaource, in Tonnerre, to the abbey. He succeeded his brother Odo II between 876 and 880. He was killed in action against the Vikings to the east of Paris and was succeeded by his nephew Adalelm.

He was married to Gisela (died between 879 and 884), daughter of Louis the Stammerer and Ansgard. He left no children.

== Sources ==
- de Saint Phalle, Édouard. "Comtes de Troyes et de Poitiers au IXe siècle: histoire d’un double échec." In Christian Settipani and Katharine S. B. Keats-Rohan, Onomastique et Parenté dans l'Occident médiéval. 2000.
- Van Kerrebrouck, Patrick. Nouvelle histoire généalogique de l'auguste maison de France, vol. 1: La Préhistoire des Capétiens. 1993.

Preceded by Odo II	Count of Troyes; 876–886	Succeeded by Adalelm
