= 1949–50 Klass B season =

The 1949–50 Klass B season was the third season of the Klass B, the second level of ice hockey in the Soviet Union. 19 teams participated in the league, and HC Spartak Minsk won the championship and was promoted to the Soviet Championship League.

== First round ==
=== Zone 1 ===
	Club	GP	W	T	L	GF	GA	Pts
1.	MWO Moscow	12	12	0	0	79	19	24
2.	Torpedo Gorky	12	8	2	2	41	25	18
3.	Dynamo Voronezh	12	5	3	4	35	26	13
4.	Spartak Ivanovo	12	5	3	4	38	44	13
5.	Spartak Voronezh	12	3	1	8	23	38	7
6.	Bolshevik Moscow	12	2	2	8	19	46	6
7.	Lokomotive Kharkiv	12	1	1	10	23	60	3

=== Zone 2 ===
	Club	GP	W	T	L	GF	GA	Pts
1.	Dynamo Chelyabinsk	12	10	1	1	62	25	21
2.	Dynamo Novosibirsk	12	10	0	2	72	19	20
3.	ODO Novosibirsk	12	7	2	3	71	26	16
4.	Krasnaya svezda Krasnokamsk	12	5	0	7	32	52	10
5.	Gorod Molotov	12	4	1	7	25	45	9
6.	Spartak Sverdlovsk	12	3	2	8	38	54	8
7.	Metallurg Stalinsk	12	0	0	12	8	87	0

=== Zone 3 ===
	Club	GP	W	T	L	GF	GA	Pts
1.	HC Spartak Minsk	8	7	1	0	17	10	15
2.	ODO Riga	8	4	1	3	32	18	9
3.	Spartak Leningrad	8	4	0	4	31	24	8
4.	ODO Leningrad	8	3	0	5	31	29	6
5.	Inkaras Kaunas	8	1	0	7	11	41	2

== Final tournament ==
	Club	GP	W	T	L	GF	GA	Pts
1.	HC Spartak Minsk	5	3	2	0	18	8	8
2.	ODO Riga	5	3	1	1	21	15	7
3.	MVO Moscow	5	3	0	2	22	11	6
4.	Dynamo Chelyabinsk	5	2	1	2	9	15	5
5.	Dynamo Novosibirsk	5	1	0	4	9	18	2
6.	Torpedo Gorky	5	1	0	4	12	24	2
