= Eudo =

Eudo is a masculine given name borne by:

- Odo the Great (died 735–740), Duke of Aquitaine, also called Eudo
- Odo, Count of Penthièvre (c. 999–1079), also Count of Brittany
- Eudo Dapifer (died 1120), Norman aristocrat, steward under William the Conqueror, William II and Henry I
- Éon de l'Étoile (Latin: Eudo de Stella) (died 1150), Breton religious leader and "messiah"
- Eudo la Zouche (died 1279), professional soldier, father of the first Baron Zouche
- Eudo Mason (1901–1969), British professor of German

== See also ==
- Eudes, a related given name
- Odo, a related given name
