= Dunnet Bay distillery =

Gin distillery in Dunnet, Caithness, Scotland

Dunnet Bay Distillery
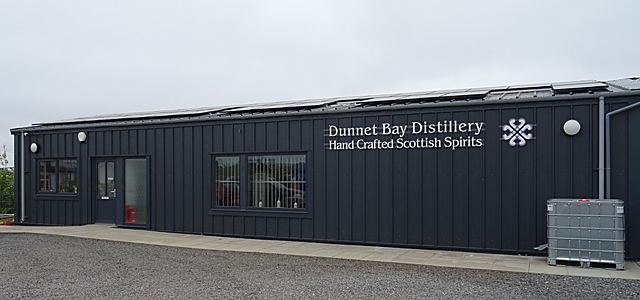
- Location: Dunnet, Caithness KW14 8XD, Scotland, United Kingdom
- Coordinates: 58.6219°N 3.3444°W
- Owner: Dunnet Bay Distillers Ltd.
- Founded: 2014; 12 years ago
- Founder: Martin Murray; Claire Murray
- Status: Operational
- No. of stills: 2 x 500 litre pot stills
- Website: dunnetbaydistillers.co.uk

Dunnet Bay distillery is a gin distillery in Dunnet, Caithness, Scotland. It is the most northerly distillery on the mainland of Great Britain.

The distillery's principal product is Rock Rose gin, though it also produces vodka and rum. A second site, a disused grain mill next to the distillery headquarters, has been converted, in order to expand into single malt whisky.

== History ==
Dunnet Bay distillery was founded in 2014 by couple Claire and Martin Murray. Martin Murray had previously worked in oil and gas for TotalEnergies and BP; Claire Murray had been in hospitality.

Clearing work on the site began in 2012. A still was purchased to exacting specifications from John Dore & Co., which would be nicknamed 'Margret', after the co-founder's mother. The first spirit run was in August 2014. A second still, nicknamed 'Elizabeth', was added later the same year. This still was named after Queen Elizabeth the Queen Mother.

The distillery was named 'Scottish Distillery of the Year' at the 2019 Scottish Gin Awards. An environmental manager was appointed in 2021, and the distillery was subsequently awarded 'Environmental/Sustainability Business of the Year' by the Federation of Small Businesses in 2022.

The company acquired a second site, the B-listed Castletown Mill, in 2021, to act as an extension of their head office. In 2022, they applied for planning permission to convert the Castletown site into a whisky distillery. The conversion of the site began in 2023.

== Products ==
Rock Rose, the flagship gin made at Dunnet Bay, was first released in 2015. The gin's name refers to the local term for one of its botanicals, Rhodiola rosea; several of its botanicals are hand-foraged in the area around the distillery.

The first variation of Rock Rose, in October 2016, was a Navy Strength bottling at 57% abv, followed by a number of 'Seasonal Editions' that reflected the four seasons of the year. A special edition of Rock Rose matured in sherry cask was made in November 2019, and a 10th anniversary edition flavoured with vanilla was released in 2024.

In 2018, the company released a limited edition gin called Broach Rose in support of the archeological charity Caithness Broach Project. The gin used botanicals inspired by plant remains retrieved from a beaker found in a Bronze Age cist grave in Achavanich. Another limited edition bottling in 2019 raised funds for the Rotary Club of Thurso. The gin was named Cold Water, after the traditional cold water surf practiced in Thurso East, and used spearmint and caraway as botanicals.

In addition to gin, the company also make Holy Grass Vodka and Mapmaker's Rum.
