= List of shipwrecks in May 1875 =

The list of shipwrecks in May 1875 includes ships sunk, foundered, grounded, or otherwise lost during May 1875.

== 1 May ==
List of shipwrecks: 1 May 1875
Ship	State	Description
Charity	United Kingdom	The brig ran aground on the Newcombe Sand, in the North Sea off the coast of Suffolk. She was on a voyage from St. Ubes, Portugal to Rotterdam, South Holland, Netherlands. She was refloated and taken in to Lowestoft, Suffolk.sc
Chilian	United Kingdom	The steamship ran aground on the West Hoyle Bank, in Liverpool Bay. She was on a voyage from New Orleans, Louisiana, United States to Liverpool, Lancashire. She was refloated.
European, and Win	United Kingdom	The steamship European collided with the fishing smack Win, which sank in the Humber. The smack's crew were rescued by European, which was then run into by the barque Vulcan (Denmark) and was severely damaged.
King of Algeria	United States	The ship was driven ashore at Blankenberge, Belgium. She was on a voyage from Philadelphia, Pennsylvania to Antwerp, Belgium. She was refloated with the assistance of tugs and assisted in to Vlissingen, Zeeland, Netherlands in a waterlogged condition.
Venus	United Kingdom	The brigantine ran aground on the Cross Sand, in the North Sea off the coast of Norfolk. She was on a voyage from Liverpool, Lancashire to Newcastle upon Tyne, Northumberland. She was refloated with the assistance of a tug and taken in to Great Yarmouth, Norfolk.

== 2 May ==
List of shipwrecks: 2 May 1875
Ship	State	Description
C. B. Hazletine	United States	The ship was driven ashore on Skagen, Denmark. She was on a voyage from Savannah, Georgia to Kronstadt, Russia. She was refloated and towed in to Helsingør, Denmark.
Consuelo	United States	The schooner was wrecked in Lake Erie with the loss of five lives.
Uhlenhorst	Germany	The steamship ran aground at Blyth, Northumberland, United Kingdom. She was on a voyage from Blyth to Hamburg. She wwas refloated with the assistance of a number of tugs and resumed her voyage.

== 3 May ==
List of shipwrecks: 3 May 1875
Ship	State	Description
Alhambra	United States	The steamship was wrecked on Cape Sable Island, Nova Scotia, Canada. All on board were rescued. She was on a voyage from Boston, Massachusetts to Prince Edward Island, Canada.
Flora	Norway	The brig capsized in the North Sea 25 nautical miles (46 km) off the coast of Suffolk, United Kingdom and was abandoned by her crew. She was beached at Great Yarmouth, Norfolk, United Kingdom on 4 May.
George Henry	United Kingdom	The ship ran aground "on Blackhurst". She was refloated and taken in to Helsingør, Denmark.
Golden Horn	United Kingdom	The steamship ran aground in Gibraltar Bay. She was on a voyage from Rangoon, Burma to Falmouth, Cornwall. She was refloated on 5 May and resumed her voyage.
Jenetta Evans	United Kingdom	The schooner was wrecked near the Logan Rock, off Penzance, Cornwall. Her crew were rescued.
Kynance	United Kingdom	The steamship was run down and sunk 12 nautical miles (22 km) off St. Ives Head, Cornwall by the steamship Ithaka. Her thirteen crew were rescued by a pilot cutter. Kynance was on a voyage from Llanelly, Glamorgan to Les Sables-d'Olonne, Vendée, France.
St. Luke	United States	The steamboat collided with the St. Charles Bridge, near the mouth of the Missouri River and sank with the loss of nine lives. She was on a voyage from Leavenworth, Indiana to St. Louis, Missouri.
Varanger	Flag unknown	The steamship was wrecked at "Langbuonas", on the east coast of the Grand Duchy of Finland.

== 4 May ==
List of shipwrecks: 4 May 1875
Ship	State	Description
Calliope	Germany	The barque ran aground at "Yali" and sank.
Ceder, and Johanna Wilhelm	Germany	The ships collided at Bremen and were both severely damaged. They were taken in to Geestemünde.
Eldorado	United States	The ship ran aground at Liverpool, Lancashire, United Kingdom. She was on a voyage from San Francisco, California to Liverpool. She was refloated.
Middleton	United Kingdom	The steamship ran aground on the Stagbank, in the River Tees and was damaged. She was on a voyage from Middlesbrough, Yorkshire to Hamburg, Germany. She was refloated and put back to Middlesbrough for repairs.

== 5 May ==
List of shipwrecks: 5 May 1875
Ship	State	Description
Copeland Isle	United Kingdom	The ship was abandoned in the Atlantic Ocean. Her twelve crew survived. She was on a voyage from Newcastle upon Tyne, Northumberland to Pictou, Nova Scotia, Canada. She was subsequently taken in to Dingle, County Kerry.
J. O. Friend Jr.	United States	The Schooner was run down and sunk on the Georges Bank by Barque Clementina (France). Crew saved.
Phoenix	Norway	The steamship was driven ashore on Terschelling, Friesland, Netherlands. She was on a voyage from Liepāja, Russia to Antwerp, Belgium. She was refloated.
Prospero	United Kingdom	The ship ran aground 2 nautical miles (3.7 km) west of Newhaven, Sussex. She was refloated and taken in to Newhaven.
Turtle Dove	United Kingdom	The smack was wrecked in Ramsey Sound with the loss of one of her three crew. Survivors were rescued by a surfboat.

== 6 May ==
List of shipwrecks: 6 May 1875
Ship	State	Description
Greece	United Kingdom	The steamship ran aground on the Mouse Sand, in the North Sea off the coast of Essex. She was on a voyage from New York, United States to London.
Ogregete	Italy	The steamship collided with the steamship Kielder Castle (United Kingdom) at Kertch, Russia and was beached in a sinking condition.
Talbot	United Kingdom	The ship was run down and sunk by a steamship in the Atlantic Ocean 25 nautical miles (46 km) off Trevose Head, Cornwall. Her crew were rescued by Flying Cloud ( (United Kingdom of Great Britain and Ireland) Jersey). Talbot was on a voyage from Cardiff, Glamorgan to Charleston, South Carolina, United States.

== 7 May ==
List of shipwrecks: 7 May 1875
Ship	State	Description
Caledonian	United Kingdom	The steamship was driven ashore 8 nautical miles (15 km) east of Cape de Gatt, Spain. Her crew were rescued. She was on a voyage from Bombay, India to London and/or Liverpool, Lancashire.
Exit	United Kingdom	The schooner was driven ashore in the Pentland Firth. She was refloated and taken in to Dunnet, Caithness in a waterlogged condition.
Light Brigade	United Kingdom	The ship ran aground at Brouwershaven, Zeeland, Netherlands. She was on a voyage from Java, Netherlands East Indies to Rotterdam, Zeeland, Netherlands.
Schiller	Germany	The ocean liner ran aground in fog on the Retarrier Ledges, Isles of Scilly, United Kingbdom with the loss of 335 lives. Some of the survivors were rescued by the pilot cutter Rapid and the boats O and M, Passby and Swift (all United Kingdom). Schiller was on a voyage from New York, United States to Hamburg.
Union	United States	The barque ran aground and sank off Steilacoom, Washington Territory. Her crew were rescued. She was on a voyage from Nanaimo, British Columbia, Canada to San Francisco, California.

== 8 May ==
List of shipwrecks: 8 May 1875
Ship	State	Description
Aberdour	United Kingdom	The barque was wrecked at Pendeen, Cornwall with the loss of three of the eleven people on board. Survivors were rescued by the Coastguard using rocket apparatus. She was on a voyage from Demerara, British Guiana to London.
Adolf	Germany	The ship was driven ashore at Dungeness, Kent, United Kingdom. She was on a voyage from Bremen to Philadelphia, Pennsylvania, United States.
Cadiz	United Kingdom	The steamship ran aground on the Banac Rock, off Ouessant, Finistère, France and sank with the loss of sixteen of the twenty people on board. She was on a voyage from Lisbon, Portugal to London.
Elderslie	New Zealand	A fierce gale and heavy swell hit the New Zealand port of Timaru, where the 203-ton schooner was at anchor. While attempting to leave the roadstead she became unfouled and drifted onto rocks, becoming a total wreck.
Julie	Flag unknown	The ship was driven ashore on Heligoland. She was on a voyage from Rouen, Seine-Inférieure, France to Danzig, Germany. She was a total loss.
King Arthur	United Kingdom	The ship spang a leak and was beached at Bombay, India.
Lady Westmoreland	United Kingdom	The ship ran aground on the Ballasters Plaat, in the Scheldt off Bath, Zeeland, Netherlands. She was on a voyage from New York, United States to Antwerp, Belgium. She was refloated with the assistance of five tugs.
Mandalay	United Kingdom	The steamship put in to Lisbon, Portugal on fire. She was on a voyage from Rangoon, Burma to Glasgow, Renfrewshire. The fire was extinguished.
Marco Polo	United States	The ship was driven ashore at Audresselles, Pas-de-Calais, France. Her crew were rescued. She was on a voyage from Baltimore, Maryland to Bremen, Germany.
Salvadora	Spain	The ship was driven ashore and wrecked at "Cymmeran", Anglesey, United Kingdom. Her crew were rescued. She was on a voyage from Savannah, Georgia, United States to Liverpool, Lancashire, United Kingdom.
St. Louis	France	The barque was driven ashore at "Cabreta Point", Spain. She was on a voyage from Toulon, Var to Saint-Pierre, Saint Pierre and Miquelon. She was refloated and towed in to Gibraltar.

== 9 May ==
List of shipwrecks: 9 May 1875
Ship	State	Description
Cyrene	New Zealand	The barque was driven ashore and wrecked at Timaru, New Zealand. Her twelve crew were landed safely. She was on a voyage from San Francisco, California, United States to Timaru.
Florence Richards	United Kingdom	The steamship ran aground off Brouwershaven, Zeeland, Netherlands. She was on a voyage from Maryport, Cumberland to Rotterdam, South Holland, Netherlands. She was refloated the next day.
Princess Alice	New Zealand	The 267-ton brig was driven ashore and wrecked Timaru, New Zealand. Her crew were rescued.

== 10 May ==
List of shipwrecks: 10 May 1875
Ship	State	Description
Alexander	Russia	The steamship ran aground on the Salvor Reef, in the Baltic Sea. She was refloated on 12 May and resumed her voyage.
Anna	France	The ship was driven ashore at Ceuta, Spain. She was on a voyage from Marseille, Bouches-du-Rhône to Réunion.
Anne Hooites	Netherlands	The ship was wrecked at Wista, near Farsund, Norway. She was on a voyage from Hartlepool, County Durham, United Kingdom to Narva, Russia.
Argonaut	United States	The barque ran aground at Bremen, Germany. She was on a voyage from Baltimore, Maryland to Bremen.
Berwick	United Kingdom	The steamship was driven ashore west of the Tenedos Lighthouse, Ottoman Empire. She was on a voyage from Newcastle upon Tyne, Northumberland to Odesa, Russia. She was refloated with the assistance of a tug.
Jason Gould	Canada	The steamship struck a sunken rock and sank off Pembroke, Ontario. She was on a voyage from Cobden to Pembroke.
Montana	United States	The Schooner was lost on Trinity Ledge near Cape St. Mary's. Crew saved.
Usworth	United Kingdom	The steamship ran aground at Sunderland, County Durham. She was on a voyage from Hamburg, Germany to Sunderland.

== 11 May ==
List of shipwrecks: 11 May 1875
Ship	State	Description
Adelaida	Spain	The barque was driven ashore near Dénia. She was on a voyage from Barcelona to Havana, Cuba.
Arthur	United Kingdom	The ship was driven ashore on North Ronaldshay, Orkney Islands. She was on a voyage from Fredrikshald, Norway to Liverpool, Lancashire. She was refloated and found to be waterlogged.
H. P. Blaisdell	United States	The schooner was run down and sunk 20 nautical miles (37 km) north east of Cape Hatteras, North Carolina by the steamship Tonawanda (United States) with the loss of two of her crew. Survivors were rescued by Tonawanda.
Remembrance	United Kingdom	The ship ran aground near Varberg, Sweden. Her crew were rescued. She was on a voyage from Hartlepool, County Durham to Wismar, Germany.
Sant Antonio	Italy	The ship collided with a British steamship and sank off Messina, Sicily with the loss of a crew member.

== 12 May ==
List of shipwrecks: 12 May 1875
Ship	State	Description
Alpha	Norway	The barque was driven ashore and wrecked at "New Ross Port", Waterford, United Kingdom.
Arthur Pedersen	Norway	The ship was driven ashore on North Ronaldshay, Orkney Islands, United Kingdom. She was on a voyage from Frederikshald to Liverpool, Lancashire, United Kingdom. She was refloated but was waterlogged.
Brilliant	United Kingdom	The ship was wrecked on Puffin Island, Anglesey. Her crew were rescued. She was on a voyage from the River Mersey to Bray, County Wicklow.
Fleur de Marie	France	The schooner was driven ashore at "Ruberg". Her crew were rescued. She was on a voyage from Rouen, Seine-Inférieure to Stettin, Germany.
Forest Queenn	United States	The barque foundered in the Atlantic Ocean off the mouth of the River Plate with the loss of her captain. Thirteen survivors took to two boats. One boat with six crew on board was reported missing. Of the seven people in the other boat, one crew member died four days later. Six survivors were rescued after nineteen days. Forest of Dean was on a voyage from Port Ludlow, Washington to Havre de Grâce, Seine-Inférieure, France.
Grand Duke Alexis	Germany	The steamship ran aground off Sandhamn, Sweden. She was on a voyage from Stettin to Stockholm, Sweden.
Köning der Nederlande	Netherlands	The ship was damaged by fire at Amsterdam, North Holland.
Maud	Netherlands	The steamship ran aground in the Bokkegat. She was on a voyage from the Black Sea to Rotterdam, South Holland. She was refloated the next day and taken in to Hellevoetsluis, Zeeland.
Norden	Germany	The schooner was driven ashore on Skagen, Denmark.
Rachel	United Kingdom	The ship ran aground on Anholt, Denmark. She was on a voyage from Grangemouth, Stirlingshire to Copenhagen, Denmark. She was refloated and completed her voyage.
New England	United States	The ship sprang a severe leak and was beached at New York.

== 13 May ==
List of shipwrecks: 13 May 1875
Ship	State	Description
Barrasford	United Kingdom	The steamship ran aground in the Maas. She was on a voyage from Rotterdam, South Holland, Netherlands to London. She was refloated on 16 May and resumed her voyage.
Harkaway	United Kingdom	The ship ran aground on the Gowlings. She was on a voyage from the Strangford Lough to Douglas, Isle of Man.
Hope	United Kingdom	The schooner ran aground on the Woolsteners Shoal, in the English Channel off Hayling Island, Hampshire. She was on a voyage from Wexford to Southampton, Hampshire.

== 14 May ==
List of shipwrecks: 14 May 1875
Ship	State	Description
Anna	Germany	The ship was driven ashore at "Nebrung", near Pillau. Her crew were rescued.
Borussia	Germany	The steamship was severely damaged by fire at "Salgar", in the West Indies. All on board survived.
Conatio	Germany	The steamship ran aground off Gotland Sweden. She was on a voyage from Reval, Russia to Flensburg. She was refloated and taken in to Copenhagen, Denmark for repairs.

== 15 May ==
List of shipwrecks: 15 May 1875
Ship	State	Description
Henry Ranking	United Kingdom	The ship was wrecked at Aracaty, Brazil. She was on a voyage from Aracaty to Liverpool, Lancashire.
Princess Royal	United Kingdom	The cutter was wrecked at "Little Plumb Point".
Unnamed	Flag unknown	The ship was run into by the steamship Ava (France) and sank in the Strait of Messina with the presumed loss of all on board.

== 16 May ==
List of shipwrecks: 16 May 1875
Ship	State	Description
Koophandel	Netherlands	The barque ran aground off Loviisa, Grand Duchy of Finland. She was on a voyage from the Nieuw Diep to Perno, Grand Duchy of Finland.
Northern Queen	United Kingdom	The ship ran aground on the Mahaica Flat, off Demerara, British Guiana.
Sampson	Germany	The tug suffered a boiler explosion and sank in the Elbe with the loss of all hands. She was on a voyage from Hamburg to Porto, Portugal.

== 17 May ==
List of shipwrecks: 17 May 1875
Ship	State	Description
City of Montreal	United Kingdom	The ship was driven ashore at Kamouraska, Quebec, Canada. She was on a voyage from Greenock, Renfrewshire to Montreal, Quebec.
Luneberg	Germany	The ship ran aground at Sunderland, County Durham, United Kingdom. She was on a voyage from Hamburg to Sunderland.
Nautilus	Germany	The steamship ran aground on a sunken wreck off Kronstadt, Russia. She was on a voyage from Lübeck to Kronstadt.
Polynesian	United Kingdom	The steamship ran aground on "Crave Island". She was on a voyage from Quebec City, Canada to Liverpool, Lancashire. She was refloated and resumed her voyage.
Spinee	Netherlands	The ship was driven ashore and wrecked 12 nautical miles (22 km) south of Ventspils, Courland Governorate. She was on a voyage from Newcastle upon Tyne, Northumberland, United Kingdom to Riga, Russia.

== 18 May ==
List of shipwrecks: 18 May 1875
Ship	State	Description
Georgianna	United Kingdom	The ship ran aground on the Maplin Sand, in the North Sea off the coast of Essex.

== 19 May ==
List of shipwrecks: 19 May 1875
Ship	State	Description
Amazonas	Brazil	The steamship ran aground at Pará. She was later refloated and taken in to Manaus.
Elizabeth	United Kingdom	The ship was holed by ice and sank in the Gulf of Finland off Sommers, Grand Duchy of Finland. Her crew were rescued. She was on a voyage from Sunderland, County Durham to Kronstadt, Russia.
Ellen	United Kingdom	The ship sprang a leak and was beached in Hakin Pill. She was on a voyage from Poole, Dorset to Liverpool, Lancashire.
Unnamed	Flag unknown	The schooner ran aground on the West Hoyle Bank, in Liverpool Bay.
Unnamed	Flag unknown	The barque caught fire and sank 12 nautical miles (22 km) off Saint John's, Newfoundland Colony. Her crew were rescued.

== 20 May ==
List of shipwrecks: 20 May 1875
Ship	State	Description
Banff Packet	United Kingdom	The ship struck a rock off the Island of Stroma. She was taken in to Peterhead, Aberdeenshire in a leaky condition.
Gerhard	Germany	The ship was sunk by ice in the Gulf of Finland 5 nautical miles (9.3 km) off the Styrstudden Lighthouse, Russia. Her crew were rescued. She was on a voyage from Charlestown, Cornwall, United Kingdom to Kronstadt, Russia.
HMS Oberon	Royal Navy	The Antelope-class gunvessel was severely damaged by a torpedo in an exercise in Stokes Bay and was beached at Fort Blockhouse, Gosport, Hampshire.
Pride of Mistley	United Kingdom	The schooner collided with the steamship Charles Capper (United Kingdom) and sank in the River Thames at Gravesend, Kent. Her crew were rescued.

== 21 May ==
List of shipwrecks: 21 May 1875
Ship	State	Description
Elizabeth	United Kingdom	The ship was sunk by ice off Sommers, Grand Duchy of Finland. Her crew were rescued. She was on a voyage from Sunderland, County Durham to Kronstadt, Russia.
Favourite	Canada	The ship was abandoned at sea. Her crew were rescued. She was on a voyage from Saint John to Dalhousie, New Brunswick.
Iola	United Kingdom	The ship capsized and sank in St Andrews Bay. She was on a voyage from Sunderland, County Durham to the Tay Bridge.
Neuson	Greece	The brig sprang a leak and was beached on the Berdianski Spit, in the Black Sea.
Nicholas Albert	Netherlands	The schooner ran aground off "Tolbeacon", Sweden. She was on a voyage from Bergen, Norway to Saint Petersburg, Russia. She was refloated with assistance from a steamship.

== 22 May ==
List of shipwrecks: 22 May 1875
Ship	State	Description
Alacrity	United Kingdom	The brig ran aground on the Gunfleet Sand, in the North Sea off the coast of Essex and was wrecked. Her crew were rescued by the smack Emblem (United Kingdom). Alacrity was on a voyage from Bo'ness, Lothian to Sheerness, Kent.
Caroline	United Kingdom	The ship ran aground off Vlieland, Friesland, Netherlands. She was on a voyage from London to Hamburg, Germany. She was later refloated and resumed her voyage.
Iola	United Kingdom	The schooner foundered in St Andrews Bay. Her crew were rescued by a fishing yawl. She was on a voyage from Sunderland, County Durham to Dundee, Forfarshire.
Irene	United Kingdom	The ship was driven ashore at Cap-Chat, Quebec, Canada. She was on a voyage from Caernarfon to Quebec City, Canada. She was refloated and towed in to Quebec City.
Koophandel	Netherlands	The ship ran aground at Pärnu, Grand Duchy of Finland. She was on a voyage from the Nieuw Diep to Parno.
Nornen	Norway	The ship capsized in the River Stour. She was righted.
Whittier	United States	The ship caught fire and put in to Montevideo, Uruguay. She was on a voyage from New York to San Francisco, California.

== 23 May ==
List of shipwrecks: 23 May 1875
Ship	State	Description
Gitana	United Kingdom	The steam wherry ran aground and sank at Blyth, Northumberland. She was on a voyage from Waren Mill to Blyth.
Sunbeam	United Kingdom	The steam yacht was driven ashore at Broadstairs, Kent. She was refloated.

== 24 May ==
List of shipwrecks: 24 May 1875
Ship	State	Description
Abbotsford	United Kingdom	The ship ran aground on the Litchfield Flat, off Demerara, British Guiana. She was on a voyage from Glasgow, Renfrewshire to Demerara.
Esmeralda	Chilean Navy	The corvette was driven ashore and severely damaged at Valparaíso.
Grebe	United Kingdom	The steamship was driven ashore at Porto, Portugal She was refloated.
Jules Borde	France	The barque was driven ashore at Valparaíso.
Laura McLennan	United Kingdom	The barque was damaged in a gale at Valparaíso.
No. 4	United Kingdom	The ballast hopper was run into by a steamship and sank in the River Thames at East Greenwich, Kent. She was refloated the next day and beached at North Greenwich, Middlesex.

== 25 May ==
List of shipwrecks: 25 May 1875
Ship	State	Description
Alida	United Kingdom	The ship was driven ashore and wrecked at "Cape Jack". She was on a voyage from Charlottetown, Prince Edward Island, Canada to a British port.
Eliza	United Kingdom	The smack was beached on the Isle of Harris, Outer Hebrides.
Maria	Courland Governorate	The schooner was driven ashore and wrecked at Burg auf Fehmarn, Germany. Her crew were rescued. She was on a voyage from Ventava to Holten, Overijssel, Netherlands.
Mimer	Germany	The ship was wrecked at Lemvig, Denmark. Her crew were rescued. She was on a voyage from Hartlepool, County Durham, United Kingdom to Kiel.
Narcisse	United Kingdom	The ship sank at Lytham St. Annes, Lancashire, United Kingdom. She was on a voyage from Nantes, Loire-Inférieure to Preston, Lancashire.
Speedwell	United Kingdom	The Humber Keel was run into and sunk in the River Ouse at Swinefleet, Yorkshire by the schooner Mary and Annie (United Kingdom). Her crew were rescued. Speedwell was on a voyage from Hessle to "Whitemill".
Unnamed	France	The lugger ran aground on the Pennington Spit, off the coast of Hampshire, United Kingdom.
Unnamed	United Kingdom	The fishing smack was run down and sunk 7 nautical miles (13 km) off Whitby, Yorkshire by the tug Confidence (United Kingdom) with the loss of her captain. Survivors were rescued by Confidence.

== 26 May ==
List of shipwrecks: 26 May 1875
Ship	State	Description
Assyria	Italy	The steamship ran aground on the Meloria Bank, in the Mediterranean Sea off Livorno.
Augusta	United Kingdom	The ship ran aground in the River Lee.
François Deux	France	The barque ran aground on the Tegler Piste, in the North Sea off the German coast. She was refloated but then ran aground on the Robben Platte and was wrecked. Her crew were rescued. She was on a voyage from Huelva, Spain to Hamburg, Germany.
Maria	Sweden	The barque was driven ashore at Hoburgen, Gotland. She was on a voyage from Gothenburg to Söderhamn.

== 27 May ==
List of shipwrecks: 27 May 1875
Ship	State	Description
Queen	United Kingdom	The steamship was severely damaged by fire at Hull, Yorkshire.
Union	United Kingdom	The steamship was wrecked at "Castleness", Fife.

== 28 May ==
List of shipwrecks: 28 May 1875
Ship	State	Description
Eglantine	United Kingdom	The brig was driven ashore at Calais, France. She was on a voyage from Burntisland, Fife to Calais.
Mary	United Kingdom	The schooner sank off Great Cumbrae, Argyllshire. Her crew were rescued. she was on a voyage from Ardrossan, Ayrshire to Rothesay, Isle of Bute.
Robert Marsden	United Kingdom	The schooner ran aground on the Jordan Flats, in Liverpool Bay and sank. She was on a voyage from Dalhousie, New Brunswick, Canada to Warrington, Cheshire.

== 29 May ==
List of shipwrecks: 29 May 1875
Ship	State	Description
HMS Contest	Royal Navy	The Forester-class gunboat ran aground at Mount Edgecumbe, Devon. She was refloated and taken in to Plymouth Dockyard.
Rathfern	United Kingdom	The ship departed from Bassein, India for Queenstown, County Cork. No further trace, presumed foundered with the loss of all hands.
Western Empire	United Kingdom	The ship ran aground at the mouth of the Mississippi River. She was on a voyage from New Orleans, Louisiana, United States to Liverpool, Lancashire.

== 30 May ==
List of shipwrecks: 30 May 1875
Ship	State	Description
C. A. Beng	Germany	The schooner ran aground on the Lappen. She was on a voyage from Leith, Lothian, United Kingdom to Riga, Russia. She was refloated and resumed her voyage.
Damietta	United Kingdom	The steamship ran aground off Hogland, Russia. She was on a voyage from Middlesbrough, Yorkshire to Kronstadt, Russia. She was refloated and completed her voyage.
Primus	Netherlands	The steamship ran aground at Östergarn, Sweden. She was on a voyage from Kronstadt to Rotterdam, South Holland.

== 31 May ==
List of shipwrecks: 31 May 1875
Ship	State	Description
Christine	United Kingdom	The schooner foundered off the mouth of the Rio Grande. Her crew were rescued. She was on a voyage from the Cape Verde Islands to the Rio Grande.
Stannington	United Kingdom	The steamship collided with a German barque in the English Channel 10 nautical miles (19 km) off Beachy Head, Sussex and was presumed to have foundered. Four of her ten crew were rescued by the barque. Stannington was on a voyage from Middlesbrough, Yorkshire to Jersey, Channel Islands.

== Unknown date ==
List of shipwrecks: Unknown date in May 1875
Ship	State	Description
Ada	United Kingdom	The brig was abandoned in the North Sea. Her crew were rescued by the smack Cambridge (United Kingdom). Ada was towed in to Grimsby, Lincolnshire in a leaky condition.
Aurora	United Kingdom	The ship was abandoned in ice in Canadian waters. Her crew were rescued.
Chebucto	United States	The barque ran aground at Saint John's, Newfoundland Colony.
Dora	United Kingdom	The brig was sunk by ice off Petty Harbour, Newfoundland Colony. She was on a voyage from Liverpool, Lancashire to Saint John's.
Dragoon	United Kingdom	The steamship ran aground at Strubben, Denmark. She was on a voyage from Copenhagen, Denmark to Newcastle upon Tyne, Northumberland.
Edouard	(Dominion of Newfoundland) Newfoundland Colony	The ship was driven ashore at Bay Bulls.
Eleanor	France	The schooner was abandoned in the Atlantic Ocean before 13 May.
Favourite	Flag unknown	The ship foundered. She was on a voyage from Buenos Aires, Argentina to Quebec City, Canada.
Flora	Norway	The barque ran aground. She was on a voyage from Sunderland, County Durham, United Kingdom to Stockholm, Sweden. She was refloated and taken in to Helsingør, Denmark.
Giant's Causeway	United Kingdom	The ship was driven ashore and wrecked on Anticosti Island, Nova Scotia, Canada. She was on a voyage from Dublin to Quebec City.
Henrietta	United Kingdom	The barque was abandoned at sea. Her crew were rescued. She was on a voyage from Swansea, Glamorgan to Bangon.
Hovding	Flag unknown	The ship was driven ashore on Anticosti Island. She was refloated and taken in to Quebec City.
James Coudie	United States	The barque ran aground off Wangi-wangi Island, Netherlands East Indies before 25 May. Her crew were rescued. She was on a voyage from New York to Yokohama, Japan. She was refloated on 2 July and towed in to Surabaya, Netherlands East Indies in a leaky condition.
Julie Esson	Canada	The ship capsized in the Atlantic Ocean.
Kong Sverre	Norway	The ship was abandoned in ice in Canadian Waters. Her crew were rescued. She was on a voyage from Kragerø to Quebec City.
Loto	United Kingdom	The ship was abandoned in the Pacific Ocean before 19 May. Her crew were rescued. She was on a voyage from Corinto, Nicaragua to Falmouth, Cornwall.
Margaret	United Kingdom	The brig ran aground at Gilleleje, Denmark. She was on a voyage from Sunderland to Kronstadt, Russia. She was refloated with assistance.
Milton	United Kingdom	The ship was driven ashore before 6 May. She was on a voyage from Pensacola, Florida, United States to Liverpool. She was refloated and taken in to New York.
Native	United Kingdom	The smack ran aground on the North Bank, in the Irish Sea off the coast of Cumberland. She was refloated with the assistance of the Maryport Lifeboat and assisted in to Maryport.
Ocean Chief	United Kingdom	The ship ran aground in Fintry Bay, Great Cumbrae, Argyllshire. She was on a voyage from Greenock, Renfrewshire to Trondheim, Norway. She was refloated and taken into Rothesay Bay.
Prince Alfred	United Kingdom	The barque foundered in the Pacific Ocean off Coquimbo, Chile before 4 May. Her crew were rescued. She was on a voyage from "Mexillones" to London.
Prosperite	Norway	The ship collided with Harlaw (United Kingdom) and was abandoned in the Atlantic Ocean. Her crew were rescued by Harlaw. Prosperite was on a voyage from New York to Exeter, Devon, United Kingdom. She was subsequently taken in to Queenstown, County Cork, United Kingdom in a derelict condition.
Tonsberg	Germany	The ship was abandoned at sea. Her crew were rescued.
Viton	France	The ship was wrecked in the Scarcies River. She was on a voyage from Marseille, Bouches-du-Rhône to the Scarcies River.
Wimbledon	United Kingdom	The ship was abandoned in the Atlantic Ocean off the Azores.
