= List of listed buildings in Dunnet, Highland =

This is a list of listed buildings in the parish of Dunnet in Highland, Scotland.

== List ==
Name	Location	Date Listed	Grid Ref. (Note: Sometimes known as OSGB36, the grid reference (where provided) is based on the British national grid reference system used by the Ordnance Survey. • "Guide to National Grid". Ordnance Survey. • "Get-a-map". Ordnance Survey.)	Geo-coordinates	Notes	LB Number (Note: Historic Environment Scotland assign a unique alphanumeric identifier to each designated site in Scotland, for listed buildings this always begins with "LB", for example "LB12345".)	Image
Dunnet Head Lighthouse And Keepers' Houses With Enclosure And Gate Piers				58°40′16″N 3°22′35″W	Category B	1890	Upload Photo
West Side, Dunnet, (Mrs Calder)				58°37′29″N 3°21′40″W	Category B	6223	Upload Photo
Dunnet Free Church Gate Piers And Enclosure Wall, Barrock				58°37′21″N 3°16′52″W	Category B	1887	Upload Photo
Ham Girnal And Corn Mill				58°38′35″N 3°18′45″W	Category B	1891	Upload Photo
Dunnet Parish Manse				58°37′15″N 3°20′43″W	Category B	1889	Upload Photo
Rattar House				58°38′24″N 3°17′30″W	Category B	1892	Upload Photo
Dunnet Parish Church (Church Of Scotland) And Burial Ground				58°37′17″N 3°20′42″W	Category A	1888	Upload another image

== Key ==
The scheme for classifying buildings in Scotland is:

- Category A: "buildings of national or international importance, either architectural or historic; or fine, little-altered examples of some particular period, style or building type."
- Category B: "buildings of regional or more than local importance; or major examples of some particular period, style or building type, which may have been altered."
- Category C: "buildings of local importance; lesser examples of any period, style, or building type, as originally constructed or moderately altered; and simple traditional buildings which group well with other listed buildings."

In March 2016 there were 47,288 listed buildings in Scotland. Of these, 8% were Category A, and 50% were Category B, with the remaining 42% being Category C.

== See also ==
- List of listed buildings in Highland
