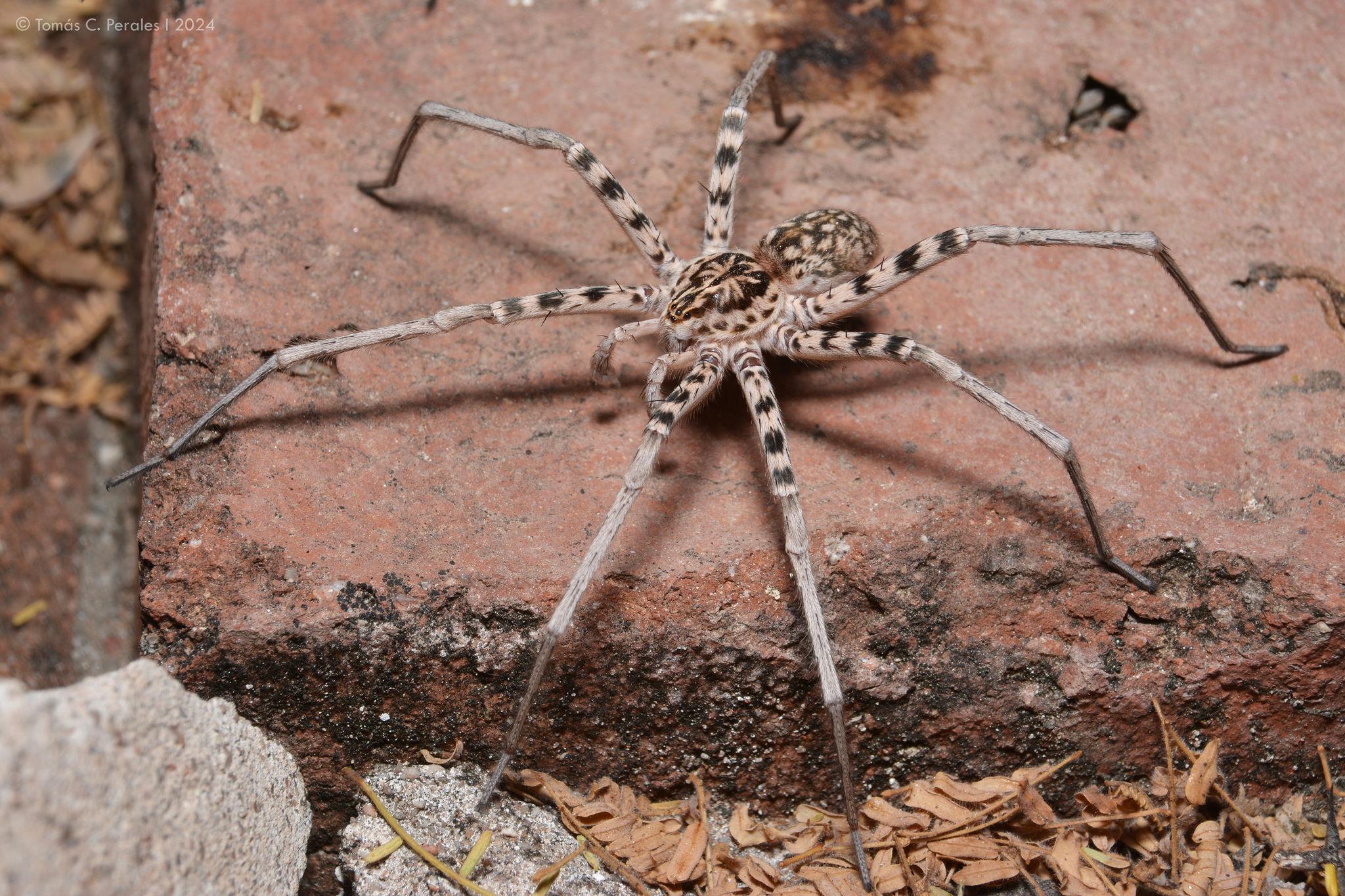
- Xenoctenus unguiculatus in Argentina
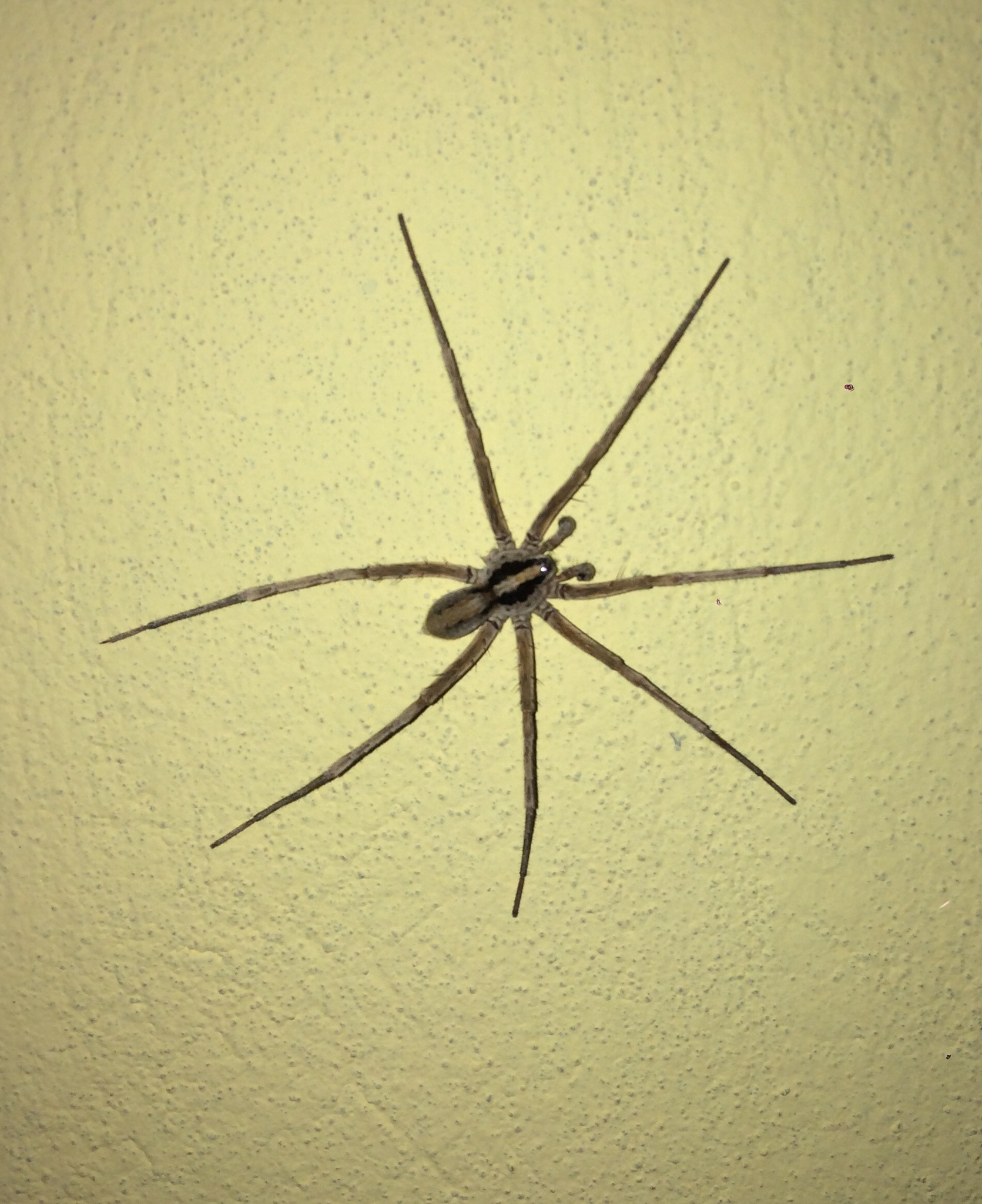
- Unidentified species of Xenoctenus

Scientific classification
- Kingdom: Animalia
- Phylum: Arthropoda
- Subphylum: Chelicerata
- Class: Arachnida
- Order: Araneae
- Infraorder: Araneomorphae
- Family: Xenoctenidae; Ramírez & Silva-Dávila, 2017

Diversity
- 4 genera, 33 species
- blue: reported countries (WSC) green: observation hotspots (iNaturalist)

= Xenoctenidae =

Family of spiders

Xenoctenidae is a family of araneomorph spiders separated from Miturgidae in 2017.

== Genera ==
As of January 2026, this family includes four genera and 33 species:

- Incasoctenus Mello-Leitão, 1942 – Peru
- Odo Keyserling, 1887 – Cuba, Hispaniola, El Salvador, Nicaragua, Mexico, South America
- Paravulsor Mello-Leitão, 1922 – Brazil
- Xenoctenus Mello-Leitão, 1938 – South America
