= Dunnet Church =

Church in Highland, Scotland

Dunnet Parish Church
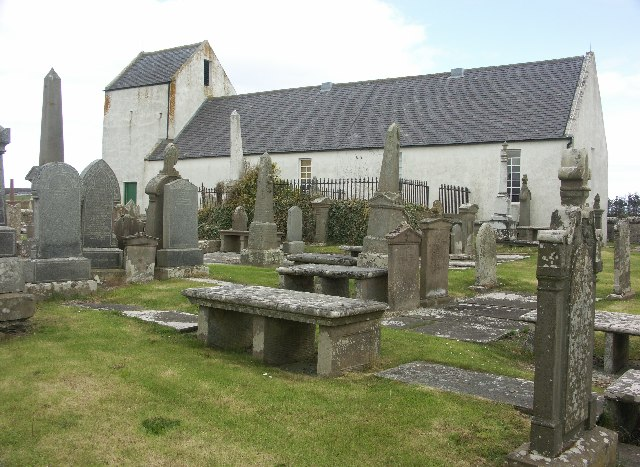
- Dunnet Church

- Location within Caithness
- 58.62152°N 3.34490°W
- OS grid reference: ND 21987 71183
- Country: Scotland
- Denomination: Church of Scotland
- Website: www.pentlandparish.org.uk/directory/dunnet-church

History
- Status: Parish church
- Dedication: St Mary

Listed Building – Category A
- Official name: Dunnet Parish Church (Church of Scotland) and Burial Ground
- Designated: 4 April 1971
- Reference no.: LB1888

Dunnet Parish Church is a Church of Scotland church in Dunnet, Caithness, northern Scotland. References to St Mary's Parish Church are known from as far back as the 13th century, and there are pre-16th century gravestones in the churchyard. It has pre-reformation origins, and the cartographer Timothy Pont was a notable minister there in 1610.
