= Loch Heilen =

Loch in Caithness, Scotland

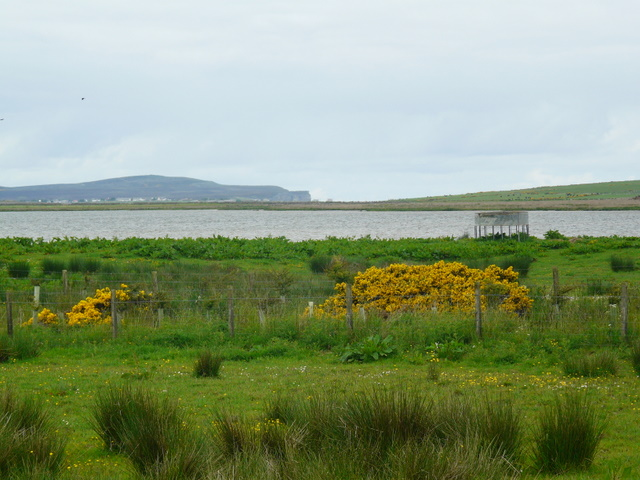

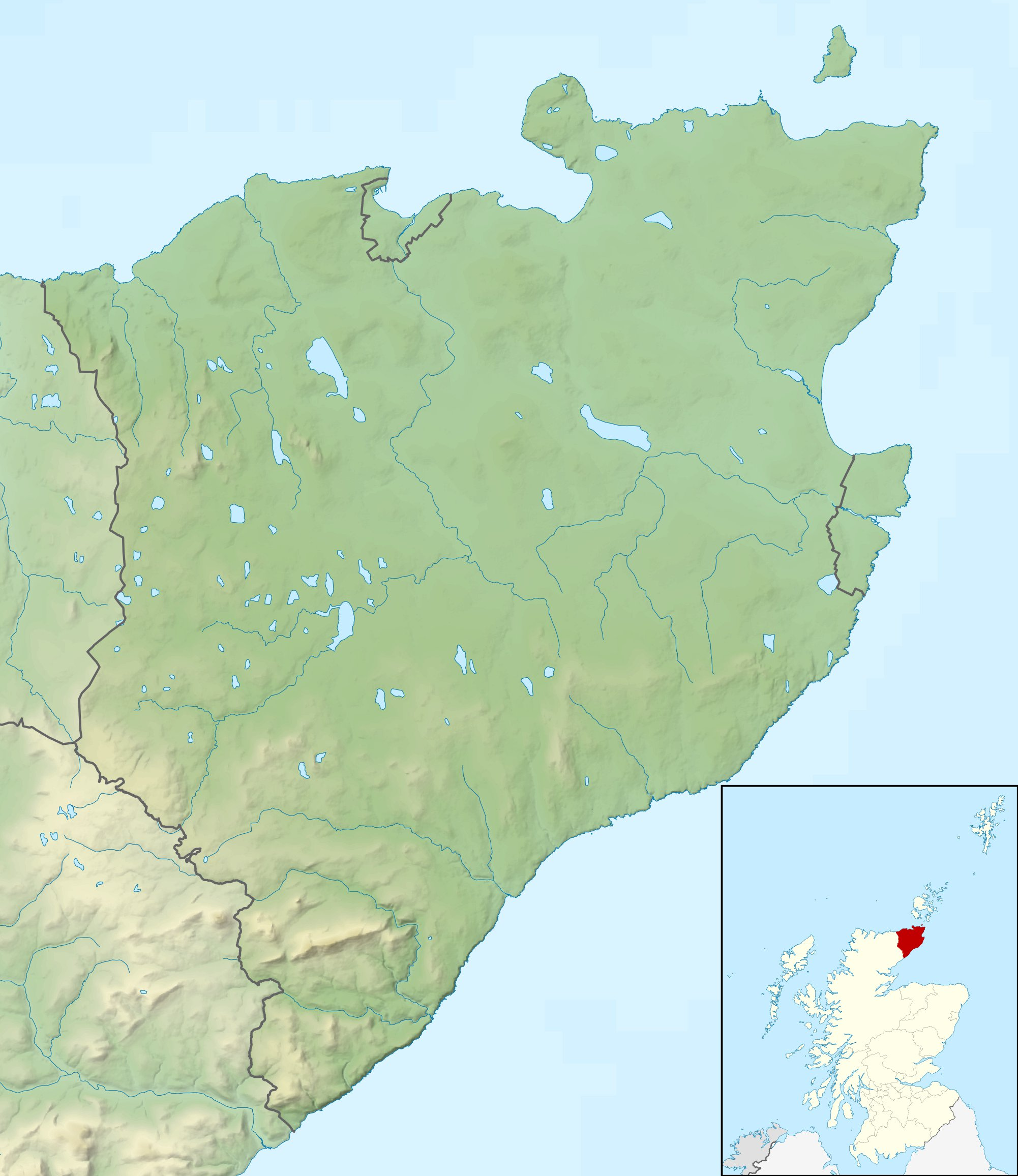
- Location within Caithness
- Location: Caithness
- Coordinates: 58°35′30″N 3°16′22″W
- Type: freshwater loch
- Primary outflows: Burn of Inkstack
- Basin countries: Scotland
- Max. length: 1 mi (1.6 km)
- Max. width: 1/2 mi (0.80 km)
- Surface area: 191 acres (0.298 mi^{2}; 0.77 km^{2})
- Average depth: 2.5 ft (0.76 m)
- Max. depth: 5 ft (1.5 m)
- Water volume: twenty-one million cu ft (590,000 m^{3})
- Surface elevation: 113 ft (34 m)

Loch Heilen is a loch in the civil parish of Dunnet in Caithness, Scotland. St. John's Loch and Loch Heilen are the two largest lochs in the parish. It is about two miles (3.2 kilometres) inland from Dunnet Bay to the west, which is on the north coast of Scotland. The town of Thurso is about eight miles (13 kilometres) to the west.

The loch has had various spellings - Hayland, Haelan, Hailan, Heilen.

The loch is orientated in an east to west direction, and is over one mile (1.6 kilometres) long. Its breadth (north-south) reaches almost a half a mile and the surface area is 191 acres (0.3 square miles; 0.8 square kilometres). The centre of the loch is the deepest part, approximately, 5 ft (1.5 m) deep.

The overflow of the loch is through the Burn of Inkstack, which exits from the north shore. This flows northwards, joining the Burn of Ham, and flowing into the sea on the north coast of Caithness, at Ham.

The loch has an abundance of ducks and other wild birds, especially Mallard, Wigeon and the Common goldeneye.
