= Adalelm of Troyes =

Count of Troyes (died 894)

Adalelm (died 8 April 894) was the Count of Troyes from 886 to his death. He was a son of Emenon, Count of Poitou, and a Robertian.

He succeeded his maternal uncle Robert I, Count of Troyes, in 886. In 891, he organised the transferral of the abbey of Saint-Loup to within the walls of the town. In 893, he confirmed the donation of Chaource to the abbey of Montiéramey, made originally by his uncle. In 894, he and his brother Adhemar of Poitou attacked Aurillac, but he died fifteen days after.

He does not seem to have had any children by his wife Ermengard. Richard, Duke of Burgundy, profited from the troubles that followed his death to seize the county of Troyes.

== Sources ==
- de Saint Phalle, Édouard. "Comtes de Troyes et de Poitiers au IXe siècle: histoire d’un double échec." In Christian Settipani and Katharine S. B. Keats-Rohan, Onomastique et Parenté dans l'Occident médiéval. 2000.

| Preceded by Robert I | Count of Troyes; 886–894 | Succeeded by Richard |
