= Abbey of Saint Loup, Troyes =

Abbey in Aube, France

Coordinates: 48°18′3″N 4°4′49″E

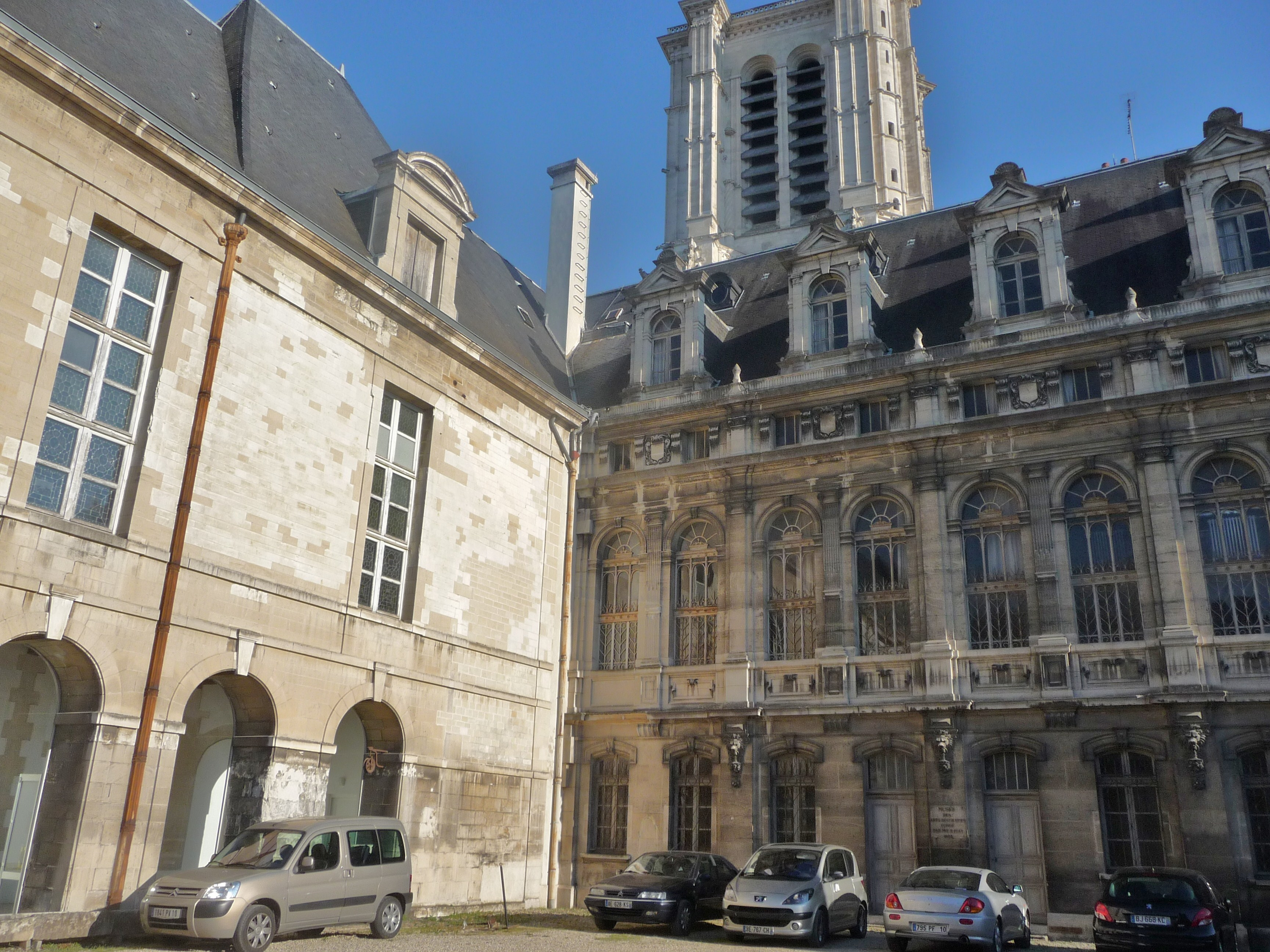
Troyes Abbaye St.Loup

The Abbey of Saint-Loup (French: Abbaye Saint-Loup de Troyes) is a religious building near Troyes in Champagne, France. It was established in the ninth century to shelter the relics of bishop Lupus of Troyes, Saint Loup, the legendary defender of the city against Attila in the 5th century and patron of the city. The monastic community was reformed in 1135 by Bernard of Clairvaux, when the abbot and his monks embraced the Rule of Saint Augustine and became Canons Regular. The Abbaye Saint-Loup, which came to be enclosed within the burgeoning medieval city of Troyes, developed a renowned library and scriptorium. The famous poet Chrétien de Troyes may have been a canon of this monastic house.

The abbey was founded — as were many abbeys— in an existing Gallo-Roman villa abutting the former Roman Via Agrippa (now the rue de la Cité) just outside the former Gallo-Roman city. Charlemagne gave the abbey of Saint-Loup to the scholarly Alcuin, and Adalelm, Count of Troyes (died 894) was a patron. Before the reform of 1135 Saint-Loup's secular canons could enjoy the fruits of their prebendaries. In the fifteenth century an imposing Flamboyant Gothic abbey church was erected; the abbey church was rededicated in 1425. The scholarly Petrus Comestor was an Augustinian canon of Saint-Loup, among his other benefices.

The abbey's church and buildings, largely reconstructed in the seventeenth century, were destroyed during the Revolution; the only building left standing, in rue Chrestien de Troyes, was used to store books and manuscripts confiscated from neighbouring abbeys and convents, among which was the Abbey of Clairvaux. Thus a municipal public library in Troyes was first created. The Musée Saint Loup (Musée des Beaux-Arts, Archéologie et Histoire Naturelle) was also installed in the building, where it has remained since 1830.
