= St. John's Loch =

Loch in Caithness, Scotland

St. John’s Loch
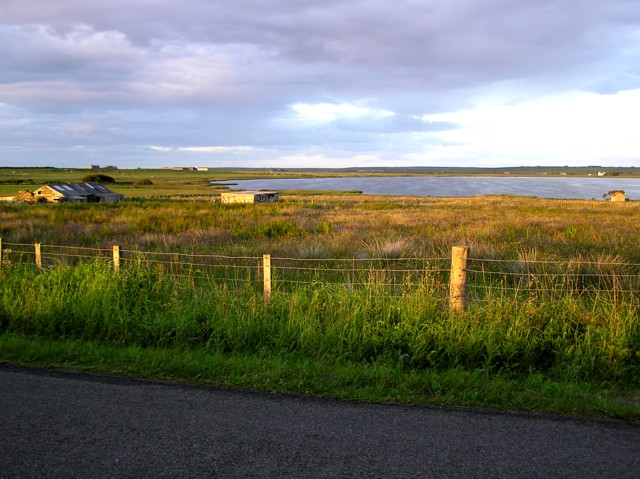

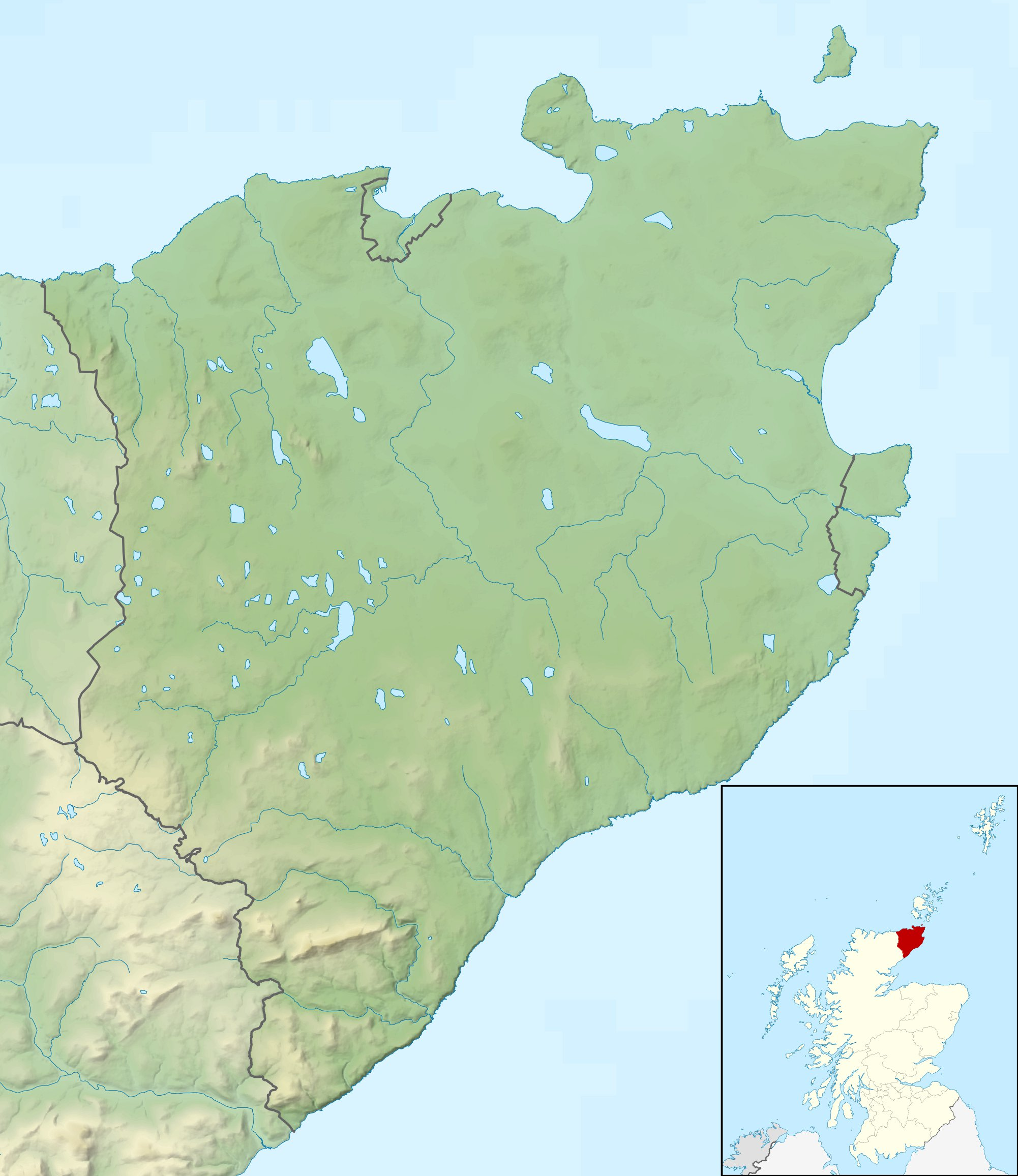
- Location within Caithness
- Location: Caithness
- Coordinates: 58.630640°N 3.335164°W
- Type: freshwater loch
- Primary outflows: Burn of Dunnet
- Basin countries: Scotland
- Max. length: 0.8 mi (1.3 km)
- Max. width: 0.6 mi (0.97 km)
- Surface area: 195 acres (0.305 mi^{2}; 0.79 km^{2})
- Average depth: 4.5 ft (1.4 m)
- Max. depth: 7 ft (2.1 m)
- Water volume: thirty-eight million cu ft (1,100,000 m^{3})
- Surface elevation: 71.3 ft (21.7 m)

St. John's Loch is a loch in the civil parish of Dunnet, in Caithness, Highland, Scotland. Loch Heilen and St. John's Loch are the two largest lochs in the parish. It is about two-thirds mile (1.1 kilometres) inland in a north-easterly direction from Dunnet Bay on the north coast of Scotland.

The loch has a round shape and is just under a one mile (1.6 kilometres) long and just over one-half mile (0.80 kilometres) wide, with a surface area of 195 acres (0.305 square miles; 0.79 square kilometres), almost the same as nearby Loch Heilen. The south-east part of the loch is the deepest, reaching 7 ft (2.1 m).

The overflow of the loch is through the Dunnet Burn, which exits from the south shore. This flows southwards for about two-thirds mile (1.1 kilometres), through the village of Dunnet and then flows into the sea at Dunnet Bay.

There is a large population of wild fowl on the inland lochs around Dunnet, with Mallard, Wigeon, Pochard and Tufted duck being recorded at St. Mary's Loch.

The loch takes its name from a Roman Catholic chapel of St John's, which stood on a grassy knoll at the eastern end of the loch. All that remains of the chapel is a 30 ft (9.1 m) x 18 ft (5.5 m) patch in rough pasture on the knoll. The chapel's priests ascribed virtuous qualities to the water of the loch and took offerings at the altar from visitors using it, enabling curing of the sick and enriching of the church. After the Reformation, the practice arose of throwing money into the loch instead.
