= Odo of Glanfeuil =

Benedictine monk and historian, 9th century AD

Odo of Glanfeuil was a ninth-century Benedictine abbot of Saint-Maur-des-Fossés, a historian, and hagiographer.

He entered the Abbey of Saint Maur de Glanfeuil (in Le Thoureil, Maine-et-Loire) not later than 856 and became its abbot in 861.

In 864 he issued a "Life of St. Maurus", a revision, he claimed, of a "Life" originally written by Faustus of Montecassino, which makes St. Maurus the founder and first abbot of Glanfeuil, and is the chief source for the legendary sojourn of that saint in France. It is so anachronistic that it is generally believed to have been composed by Odo himself, though Mabillon and a few modern writers still ascribe it to Faustus [Adlhoch in "Studien und Mitteilungen aus dem Benediktiner und Cistercienser Orden", XXVI and XXVII (Brünn, 1905 and 1906); Plaine, ibid., XVI (1905); Huillier, "Etude critique des actes de S. Maur de Glanfeuil" (Paris, 1903); Helphen in "Revue historique" LXXXVIII (Paris, 1905), 287-95]. The "Life" is printed in "Acta SS." January, II, 321–332.

In 868 Odo became Abbot of Saint-Maur-des-Fossés.

Another work of Odo, "Miracula S. Mauri, sive restauratio monasterii Glannafoliensis", has some historical value. The author narrates how he fled with the relics of St. Maurus from the Normans in 862 and how the relics were finally transferred to the monastery of St-Maur-des-Fossés near Paris in 868. It is printed in "Acta Sanctorum", January, II, 334–42.
