= Brough Castle (Caithness) =

Ruined castle in Caithness, Scotland

Coordinates: 58.6473°N 3.3312°W

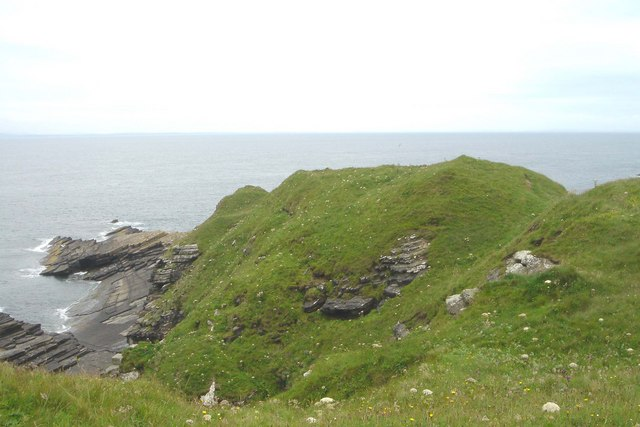
Site of Brough Castle

Brough Castle is a ruined castle near Brough, Caithness. It is believed to date from the 12th to 14th centuries.

== Description ==
The foundations of the castle are on the landward end of a long rocky promontory about 1/4 mile (400 m) north of the east end of the hamlet of Brough. A trench some 40 feet (12 m) wide and 10 to 12 feet (3 to 4 m) deep has been dug across the neck and on either side of the rock; in rear of it has been a range of buildings separated by a narrow courtyard or passage. The keep is not recognisable. The promontory tails away seawards to a shelf of rock. There appears to be no history of this castle.

== See also ==
- Castle of Old Wick
