= Incasoctenus =

Scientific classification
- Kingdom: Animalia
- Phylum: Arthropoda
- Subphylum: Chelicerata
- Class: Arachnida
- Order: Araneae
- Infraorder: Araneomorphae
- Family: Xenoctenidae
- Genus: Incasoctenus; Mello-Leitão, 1942
- Species: I. perplexus

Binomial name
- Incasoctenus perplexus Mello-Leitão, 1942

Genus of spiders

Incasoctenus is a monotypic genus of South American araneomorph spiders in the family Xenoctenidae, containing the single species, Incasoctenus perplexus. It was first described by Cândido Firmino de Mello-Leitão in 1942 and has only been found in Peru; only the female is known. Originally placed with the wandering spiders (Ctenidae), it was moved to the Xenoctenidae in 2017.
