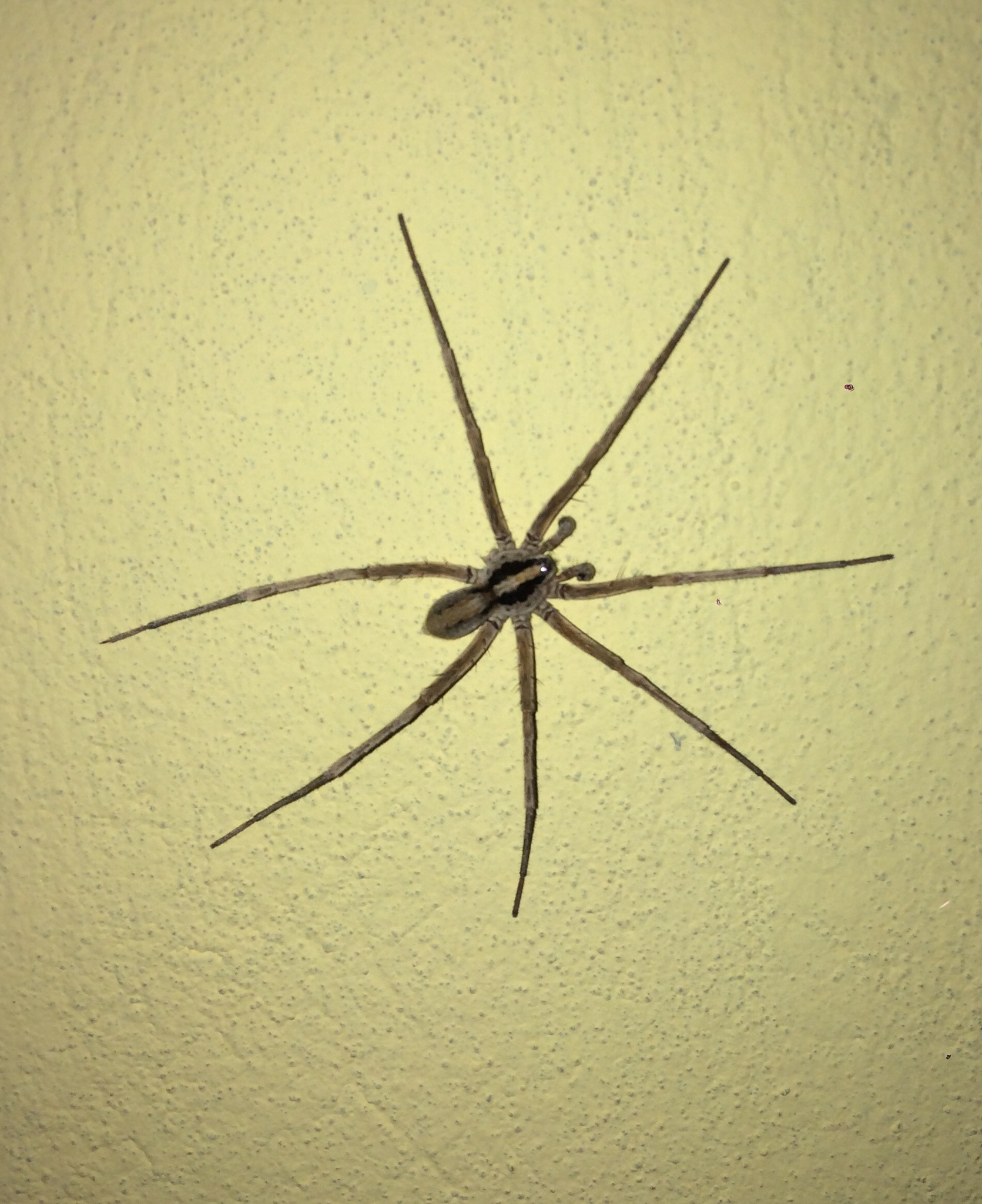
- Unidentified species of Xenoctenus

Scientific classification
- Domain: Eukaryota
- Kingdom: Animalia
- Phylum: Arthropoda
- Subphylum: Chelicerata
- Class: Arachnida
- Order: Araneae
- Infraorder: Araneomorphae
- Family: Xenoctenidae
- Genus: Xenoctenus; Mello-Leitão, 1938

Species
- Xenoctenus gomezraggioi Carcavallo & Martínez, 1967; Xenoctenus kaatinga Faustino-Magalhaes & Santos, 2024; Xenoctenus pampeanus Mello-Leitão, 1940; Xenoctenus proseni Carcavallo & Martínez, 1967; Xenoctenus unguiculatus Mello-Leitão, 1938; Xenoctenus vittatus (Mello-Leitão, 1936)

= Xenoctenus =

Genus of spiders

Xenoctenus is a genus of spiders in the family Xenoctenidae. It was first described in 1938 by Mello-Leitão. As of January 2024, it contains six species, all from South America.
