= Paravulsor =

Scientific classification
- Kingdom: Animalia
- Phylum: Arthropoda
- Subphylum: Chelicerata
- Class: Arachnida
- Order: Araneae
- Infraorder: Araneomorphae
- Family: Xenoctenidae
- Genus: Paravulsor; Mello-Leitão, 1922
- Species: P. impudicus

Binomial name
- Paravulsor impudicus Mello-Leitão, 1922

Genus of spiders

Paravulsor is a monotypic genus of South American araneomorph spiders in the family Xenoctenidae, containing the single species, Paravulsor impudicus. It was first described by Cândido Firmino de Mello-Leitão in 1922, and has only been found in Brazil. Originally placed with the wandering spiders, it was moved to the Miturgidae in 2014, and to the Xenoctenidae in 2017.
