= Dunnet Forest =

Forest in Highland, Scotland

Coordinates: 58.612°N 3.333°W

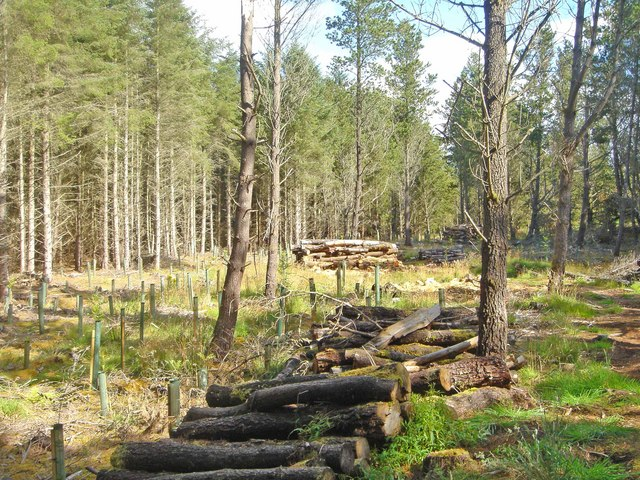
Dunnet Forest. Pines being replaced by broadleaves.

Dunnet Forest in Dunnet, Caithness, Scotland, is the most northerly community woodland on the UK mainland, and has been managed since 2003 by Dunnet Forestry Trust.

The forest was planted by the Forestry Commission in the mid-1950s, and later transferred to Scottish Natural Heritage.
