= Dunnet =

Coordinates: 58.62°N 3.34°W

Dunnet: Scottish Gaelic: Dùnaid
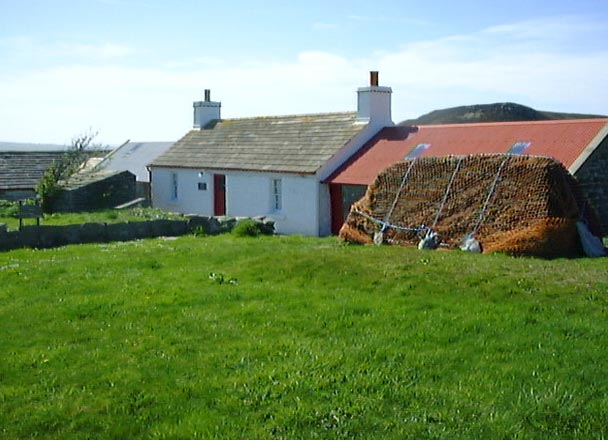
- Mary Anne's Cottage Museum, a museum of crofting life, in West Dunnet

- Location within the Caithness area
- OS grid reference: ND221713
- Council area: Highland
- Lieutenancy area: Caithness
- Country: Scotland
- Sovereign state: United Kingdom
- Post town: THURSO
- Postcode district: KW14
- Dialling code: 01847
- Police: Scotland
- Fire: Scottish
- Ambulance: Scottish
- UK Parliament: Caithness, Sutherland and Easter Ross
- Scottish Parliament: Caithness, Sutherland and Ross

Dunnet is a village in Caithness, in the Highland area of Scotland. It is within the Parish of Dunnet.

== Village ==
The village centres on the A836–B855 road junction. The A836 leads towards John o' Groats in the east and toward Thurso and Tongue in the west. (At the junction however the road's alignment is much more north-south than east-west.) The B855 leads toward Brough and Dunnet Head point in the north.

The Northern Sands Hotel is located on the A836, adjacent to the village church. It is a small hotel with 12 bedrooms, a large dining room, a large car park and 2 bars. It was originally called The Golf Links Hotel, there being a links course between Dunnet and Castletown that fell into disuse during World War II. It was taken over by the RAF during WW2 & used to station pilots from the nearby RAF Castletown fighter station. It is locally owned and in 2017 undertook a major renovation.

The village has a hall, The Britannia Hall, which is run by a committee, and which is used for a variety of activities including a children's nursery, an indoor bowling club, a badminton club and the Post Office, which visits twice a week, on Wednesday afternoons and Saturdays. Its main fund raising activity each year for the upkeep of the hall is the Marymas Fair, held in late August on a nearby farm field, it has the usual attractions such as Highland dancing, a display of vintage and classic cars and motorcycles, bonniest baby, home baking, tossing the wheatsheaf, line dancing, face painting, raffles and tug of war.

The Dunnet Bay distillery was founded in the village in 2014.

== House of the Northern Gate ==
The House of the Northern Gate (sometimes called Dwarick House) sits in a commanding position on Dunnet Head, overlooking the west side of the village. It was built between 1895 - 1908 by Admiral Alexander Sinclair who also owned Freswick, Keiss & Dunbeath Estates. Admiral Sinclair died in 1945 and the estate was broken up, the last croft to be bought by its tenant was by Mary Ann & James Calder, now a museum. The estate was bought in 1948 by Commander Clair Vyner and his wife Lady Doris Vyner. They used it as a summer residence and ran the local salmon station. Lady Doris was a close friend of Queen Elizabeth The Queen Mother, and invited her to stay at the house in 1953. During her stay, she looked east out of one of the upper floor windows and spied the tower of the recently vacated Barrogill Castle, 6 miles (9.7 km) away. Upon enquiring about the castle, a visit was arranged to view it. It was owned by Captain and Mrs Imbert-Terry, an eccentric couple whose family reputedly owned Terry's chocolate factory in York. A deal was struck to buy the rather dilapidated castle and Longoe Mains farm for a reported £6,000. The Queen Mother renamed it the Castle of Mey, its original name.

The House of the Northern Gate was run as a hotel by Bill Dodd from 1967 until 1974 and then owned by a Mr Divanian Gold from 1974 until around 1984/5, a flamboyant Jewish fashion clothes manufacturer from Manchester, who used it as a summer home. He later tried to sell building plots on its land, but the council vetoed the project on grounds of drainage and sewerage difficulties, because the land is flow country or blanket bog.

In 1974 when it came on the market, the rock band Led Zeppelin viewed it several times with a view to making it into a recording studio. A possible reason for this may be that guitarist Jimmy Page already owned Boleskine House, for many years the home of notorious occultist Aleister Crowley, near Foyers on the south bank of Loch Ness, and was a frequent visitor to Caithness. During this period, scenes from a horror film were recorded using the outside of the house as a backdrop. The house was empty until 1984/5, when a family from Kent bought it and made it into a private residence again. It has 1,800 acres (7.3 km^{2}) of land, 6 lochs and a small beach, the Peedie Sannie ("Small Beach").

== Church ==
Dunnet Church is near the road junction and has documented history dating from 1230.

From 1726 to 1750 the minister was Rev James Oswald who was born and raised in Dunnet and served as Moderator of the General Assembly of the Church of Scotland in 1765.

== Nearby ==
- Dunnet is at the north/northeast end of Dunnet Beach, which extends across three miles (5 km) towards Castletown (ND196678).
- Dunnet Forest (ND226701) is south of the village and east of the here southward A836.
- St. John's Loch (ND226722), known also as Dunnet Loch, is north-east of the village.
- Loch Heilen is 2¾ miles south-east of Dunnet.
- Situated about two miles north of Dunnet is the village of Brough (ND2283 7404), the most northerly village in mainland Britain. The ruins of the twelfth century Brough Castle are on the property known as Heathcliff.
- Dunnet Head with Dunnet Head Lighthouse, the most northerly point of the island of Great Britain, is 3½ miles to the north.
- Dunnet Bay distillery is the most northerly mainland distillery in Great Britain.

== Archaeology ==
Brotchie's Steading facing north-east showing the depth of stratigraphy

Brotchie's Steading is a ruined croft house just to the west of Dunnet Church. It originally became the focus of archaeological interest because structural members (cruck blades) in one of the rooms were known to have been formed from a pair of whale mandibles, probably from a fin or blue whale. These are presently housed in the Dunnet Bay Visitor Centre.

An excavation by Headland Archaeology was undertaken to examine the role of whale bones as a construction material in Caithness croft houses, but it quickly became apparent that the 19th to 20th century croft houses sit on a much older and extensive archaeological site.

Trial trenching has shown that the bank upon which Brotchie's Steading sits is largely man-made and part of an extensive settlement mound that possibly includes a ruined broch. The earliest deposits excavated were from an occupation surface and material from this provided a date in the range 390-170 BC. At the north end of the site, a thick layer of stone rubble associated with a clay and stone-lined pit and two red deer antler picks was identified. Radiocarbon dating showed these to be from the 1st to 3rd centuries AD. The overlying strata supported by a sequence of radiocarbon dates and dateable finds indicate that the site was also a focus of human activity in the 5th, 13th and 15th centuries up until the early 20th century. While the full extent of the site is currently unknown, the knoll upon which Dunnet Church now sits would appear to form a part of a major archaeological site that has seen almost continuous, or at least regular, occupation for over two millennia.

== See also ==
- List of listed buildings in Dunnet, Highland
