= Ham, Caithness =

Coordinates: 58.643821°N 3.314171°W

Ham
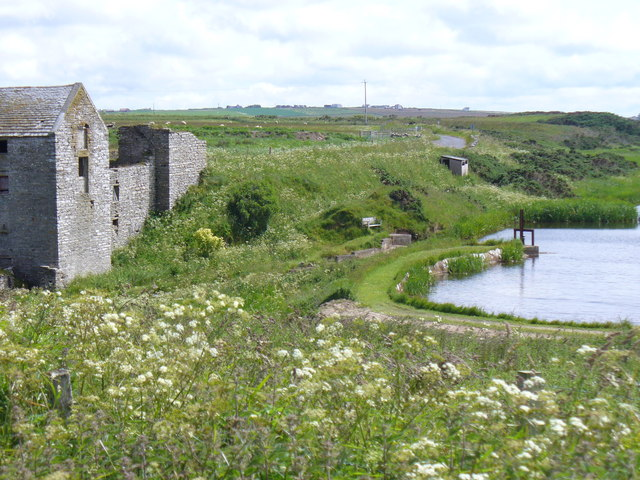
- The old watermill and mill pond at Ham

- Location within the Caithness area
- OS grid reference: ND243733
- Council area: Highland
- Country: Scotland
- Sovereign state: United Kingdom
- Postcode district: KW14 8XP
- Police: Scotland
- Fire: Scottish
- Ambulance: Scottish

Ham is a village in the Caithness region in the Scottish council area of Highland. It has a very short river running from a mill pond to the sea - a total distance of under 30m at high tide.
