= Dunnet Head =

Most northerly point of Great Britain

Dunnet Head Scottish Gaelic: Ceann Dùnaid
- Headland
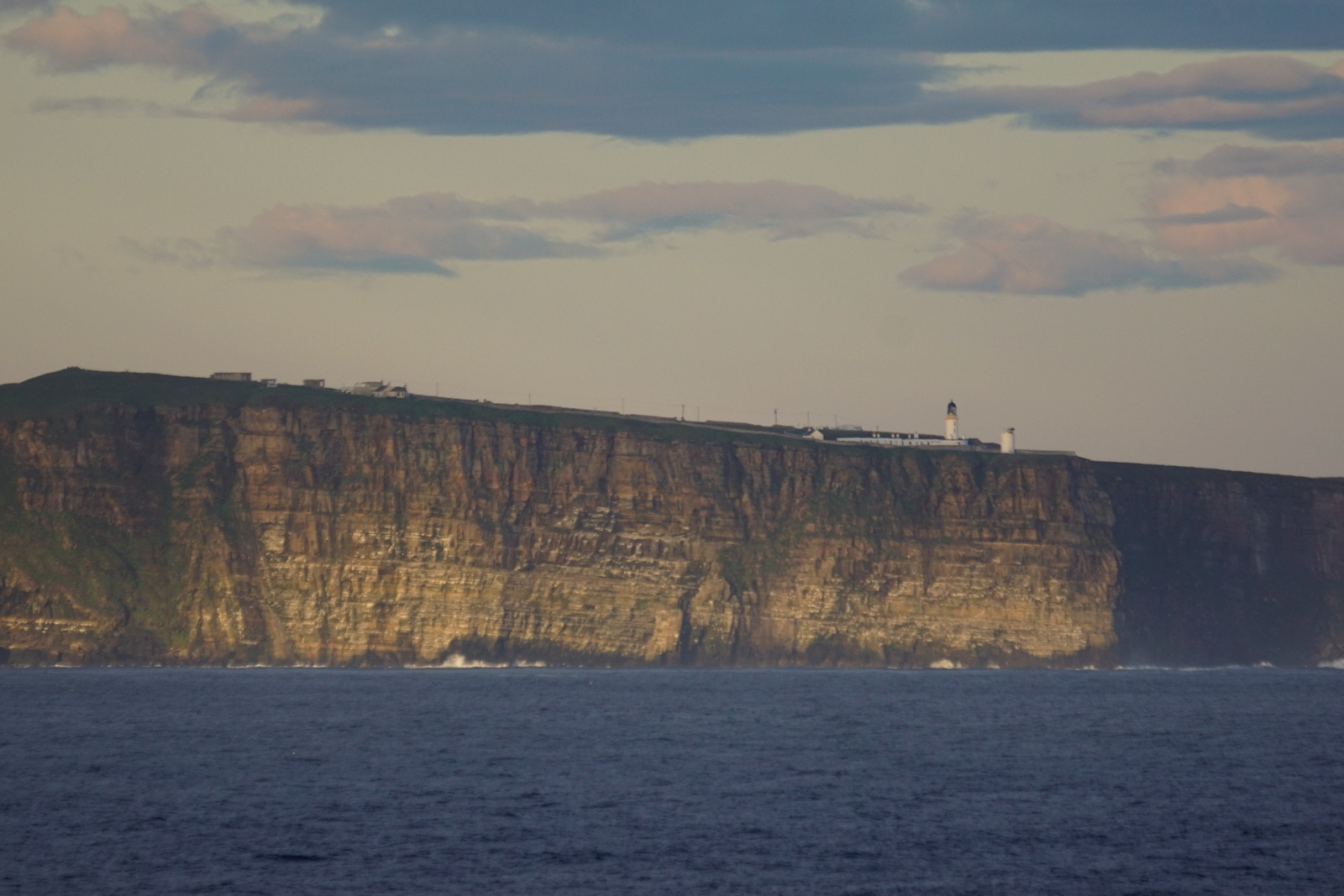
- View of Dunnet Head from the Pentland Firth

- Location within Scotland
- Coordinates: 58°40′21″N 03°22′31″W
- Location: Scottish Highlands

Dunnet Head (Scottish Gaelic: Ceann Dùnaid) is a peninsula on the northern coast of Caithness, Scotland, 10.5 miles (17 km) west of John o' Groats. It terminates at Easter Head, the northernmost point on the island of Great Britain at 58°40′21″N 03°22′31″W.

== Geography ==
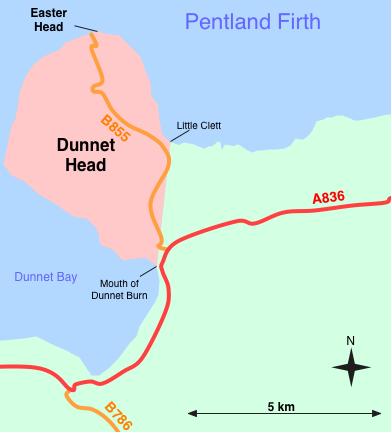
Sketch map of the peninsula

Dunnet Head forms the western limit of the Pentland Firth, the eastern limit being Duncansby Head. The peninsula's boundary with the rest of the Scottish mainland can be defined as a north–south line running from Little Clett (ND220740) to the mouth of Dunnet Burn (ND217709) in Dunnet Bay. This line is followed along most of its route by a single track road, the B855, which links Brough with the village of Dunnet, making this the most northerly road on mainland Britain. From this line, the headland projects westward and northward into the Atlantic Ocean and the Pentland Firth and shelters the more southerly waters of Dunnet Bay.

The peninsula is north-east of the burgh of Thurso, and on a clear day, it affords views of the islands of Stroma to the east, and Hoy and the Orkney Mainland, 15 km (9 miles) away to the north, across the Pentland Firth.

== Military use ==
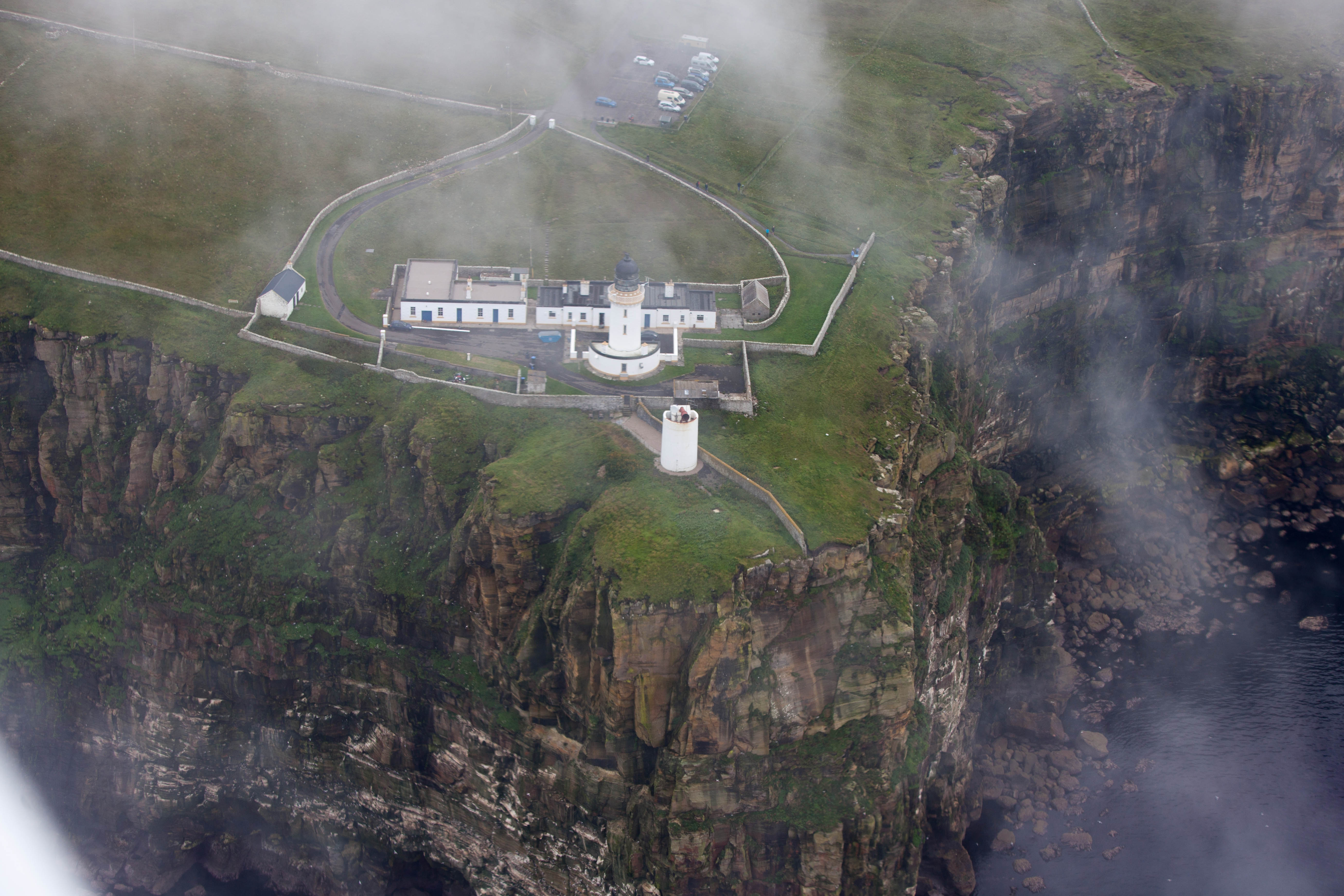
Easter Head

Near the Dunnet Head lighthouse are minor fortifications built during World War II to protect the naval base at Scapa Flow, including a Chain Home Low radar station and a bunker used by the Royal Observer Corps during the Cold War. Burifa Hill on Dunnet Head was the site of the master station and a monitoring station of the northern GEE chain of radio navigation stations during World War II. There was also an artillery range on Dunnet Head during World War II.

== Angling ==
Dunnet Head lochs are restocked every two years with brown trout fry; fishing by permit is between 1 April and early October.

== Bird watching ==
Dunnet Head has a viewing platform where visitors can watch birds in the neighbouring cliffs. Depending on the season, birds may include fulmars, guillemots, kittiwakes, puffins, great skuas, arctic skuas, razorbills, and – at sea – gannets and herring gulls.

== Geodesy ==
Dunnet Head was the central meridian of the 6-inch (150-millimetre) and 1:2500 Ordnance Survey maps of Caithness.

== Ptolemaic record ==
Dunnet Head is recorded as Virvedrum in Ptolemy's 2nd-century Geography.

== See also ==
- List of extreme points of the United Kingdom
- List of lighthouses in Scotland
- List of Northern Lighthouse Board lighthouses
