= Dennett =

Dennett is a surname. Notable people with the surname include:

- Daniel Dennett (1942–2024), American philosopher, writer, and cognitive scientist
- Fred Dennett (1863–1928), American politician
- Fred A. Dennett (1849–1920), American politician
- Edward George Dennett (1879–1937), English cricketer
- Lydia Neal Dennett (1798–1881), American abolitionist and suffragist
- Mary Dennett (1872–1947), American birth control activist
- Paul Dennett, British politician
- Pruett Mullens Dennett (1899–1918), British military aviator
- R. E. Dennett, English trader and author
- Russell Dennett, British musician (The Human League)
- Tyler Dennett (1883–1949), American historian
