= Dunnet Head Lighthouse =

Active 19th century lighthouse that stands on Dunnet Head, Scotland

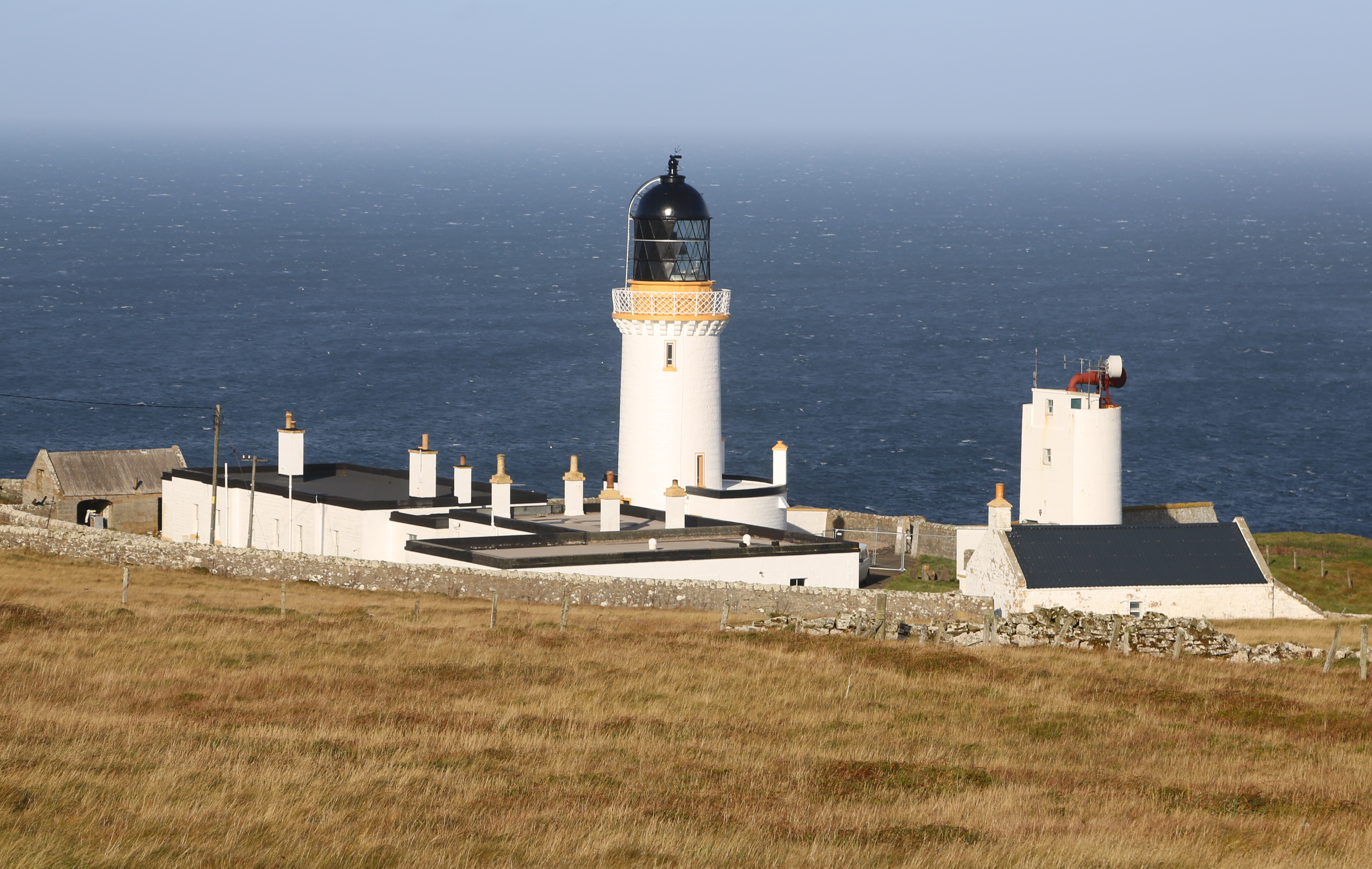
- The Dunnet Head lighthouse
- Location: northernmost point of the mainland of Great Britain; Dunnet Head; Caithness; Scotland
- OS grid: ND2027376775
- Coordinates: 58.671290°N 3.376628°W

Tower
- Constructed: 1831
- Designed by: Robert Stevenson
- Construction: masonry tower
- Automated: 1989
- Height: 20 metres (66 ft)
- Shape: cylindrical tower with balcony and lantern
- Markings: white tower, black lantern, ochre trim
- Power source: mains electricity
- Operator: Northern Lighthouse Board
- Heritage: category B listed building

Light
- Focal height: 105 metres (344 ft)
- Range: 29 nautical miles (54 km; 33 mi)
- Characteristic: Fl(4) W 30s

Dunnet Head Lighthouse is an active 19th century lighthouse that stands on the 300-foot (91 m) cliff top of Easter Head on Dunnet Head. The lighthouse is 66 feet (20 m) tall and was built in 1831 by Robert Stevenson, grandfather of Robert Louis Stevenson. The lighthouse was automated in 1989, and the keepers were withdrawn. It is now checked remotely by the Northern Lighthouse Board operations centre in Edinburgh.

== See also ==
- List of lighthouses in Scotland
- List of Northern Lighthouse Board lighthouses
