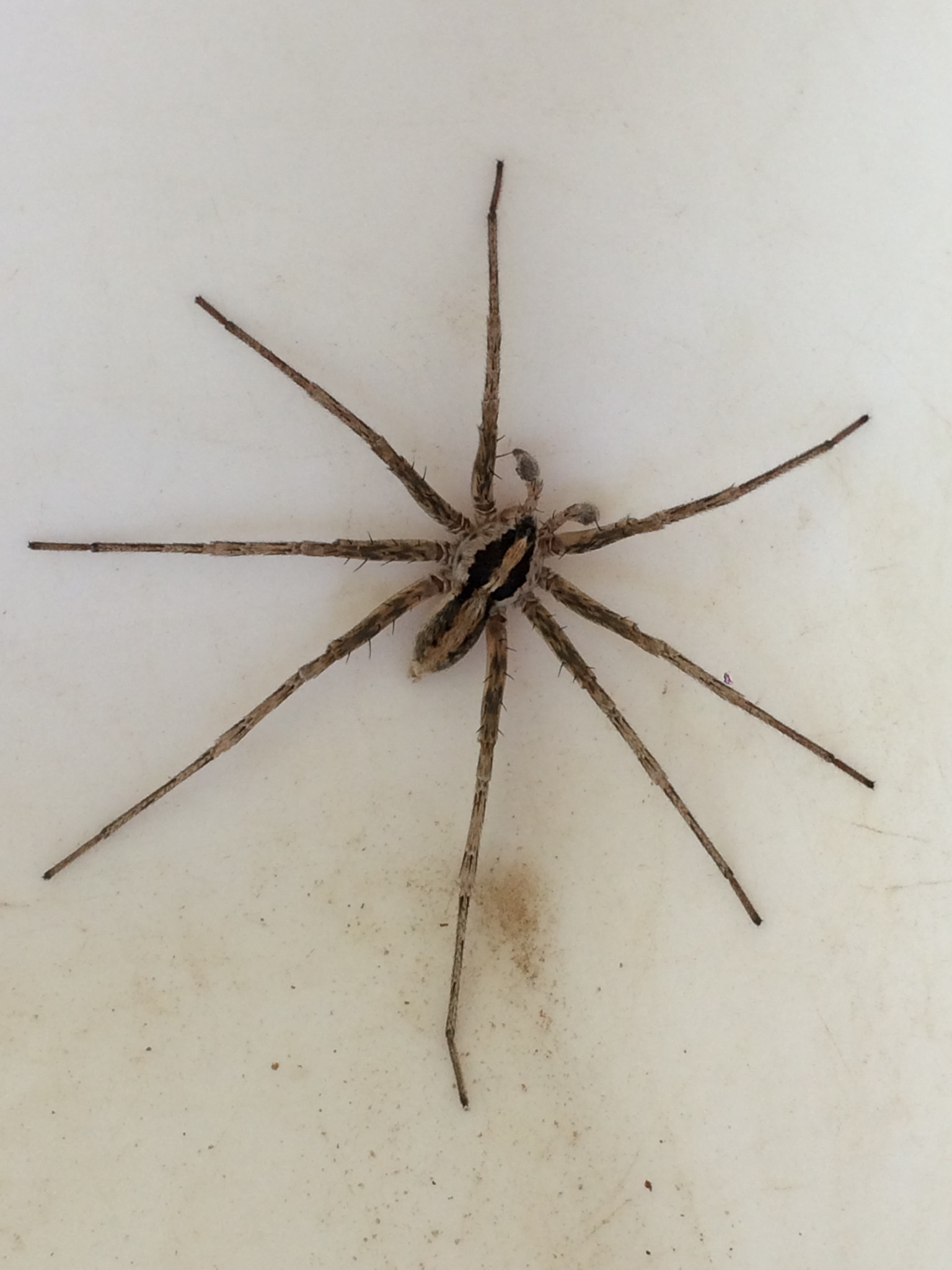
- Odo vittatus

Scientific classification
- Domain: Eukaryota
- Kingdom: Animalia
- Phylum: Arthropoda
- Subphylum: Chelicerata
- Class: Arachnida
- Order: Araneae
- Infraorder: Araneomorphae
- Family: Xenoctenidae
- Genus: Odo; Keyserling, 1887

Diversity
- 27 species

Synonyms
- Diactenus Mello-Leitão, 1938; Horioctenus Chamberlin, 1916

= Odo (spider) =

Genus of spiders

Odo is a genus of spiders in the family Xenoctenidae, containing 25 species occurring in Central and South America, and Australia.

== Species ==
As of January 2024, it contains 25 species:

- Odo abudi (Alayón, 2002) — Hispaniola
- Odo agilis (Simon, 1897) — St. Thomas
- Odo ariguanabo (Alayón, 1995) — Cuba
- Odo blumenauensis (Mello-Leitão, 1927) — Brazil
- Odo bruchi (Mello-Leitão, 1938) — Argentina
- Odo cubanus (Franganillo, 1946) — Cuba
- Odo desenderi (Baert, 2009) — Ecuador (Galapagos Is.)
- Odo drescoi (Caporiacco, 1955) — Venezuela
- Odo galapagoensis (Banks, 1902) — Ecuador (Galapagos Is.)
- Odo gigliolii (Caporiacco, 1947) — Guyana
- Odo incertus (Caporiacco, 1955) — Venezuela
- Odo insularis (Banks, 1902) — Ecuador (Galapagos Is.)
- Odo keyserlingi (Kraus, 1955) — El Salvador
- Odo lenis (Keyserling, 1887) — Nicaragua
- Odo limitatus (Gertsch & Davis, 1940) — Mexico
- Odo lycosoides (Chamberlin, 1916) — Peru
- Odo maelfaiti (Baert, 2009) — Ecuador (Galapagos Is.)
- Odo obscurus (Mello-Leitão, 1936) — Brazil
- Odo patricius (Simon, 1900) — Peru, Chile
- Odo pulcher (Keyserling, 1891) — Brazil
- Odo roseus (Mello-Leitão, 1941) — Argentina
- Odo sericeus (Mello-Leitão, 1944) — Argentina
- Odo serrimanus (Mello-Leitão, 1936) — Brazil
- Odo similis (Keyserling, 1891) — Brazil
- Odo tulum (Alayón, 2003) — Mexico
