= The Funeral Orchestra =

Swedish funeral doom band

- Also known as: TFO
- Origin: Gothenburg and Ljungskile, Sweden
- Genres: Funeral doom
- Years active: 2002–2014, 2017–present
- Labels: Aftermath, NWN!, Nirucon
- Members: Priest I Priest II; Priest III
- Past members: Two old priests
- Website: thefuneralorchestra.org

The Funeral Orchestra (often abbreviated to TFO) is a funeral doom band from Sweden.

== History ==
The Funeral Orchestra's debut studio album, Feeding the Abyss, was released on 30 June 2003, via Aftermath Music. In January 2006, the band was announced to have signed a new deal with Aftermath Music, before releasing Slow Shalt Be the Whole of the Law (demo 2002 re-issue on CD); said album was released on 6 June 2006. In July 2009, the band's first music video, "Opium de Occulta" off their 2008 EP ODO, was released.

In summer 2010, Aftermath Music released a split album between The Funeral Orchestra and Ocean Chief, titled The Northern Lights II.

In 2020, the band released their second album, Negative Evocation Rites, via NWN! Productions (vinyl LP) and Nirucon Productions (cassette tape).

== Band members ==
Current

- Priest I – vocals, guitar (2002–present)
- Priest II – bass (2019–present), guitar (2003)
- Priest III – percussion (2019–present)

Former

- Priest x – bass (2003)
- Priest x – drums, percussion (2003–2019)

== Discography ==
- SSBTWOTL Demo 2002 (demo, 2002)
- We Are the End (demo, 2003)
- Feeding the Abyss (full-length, 2003, Aftermath Music)
- Slow Shalt Be the Whole of the Law (demo 2002 reissue on CD, 2006, Aftermath Music)
- ODO (EP, 2008, Aftermath Music)
- Northern Lights II (split with Ocean Chief, 2010, Aftermath Music)
- Korp (split with In Mourning, Djevel, Kari Rueslåtten and Amtimatter
- Apocalyptic Plague Ritual MMXX (full-length, 2020, self-released)
- Negative Evocations - (The EP) (EP, 2020, self-released)
- Negative Evocation Rites (full-length, 2020, NWN! Productions, Nirucon Productions)
