= ODO Riga =

Latvian sport club

ODO (Russian: ОДО) was a sports club in Riga, then Latvian SSR, with teams in bandy and ice hockey. It was only active for some years, but managed to come second in the Soviet bandy championships in 1953. The club played in the ice hockey league Soviet2.
