= Odo I of Troyes =

Count of Troyes

Odo (or Eudes) I (died 10 August 871) was the Count of Troyes from 852 to 859 and Count of Châteaudun through 871.

His ancestry is not known for certain. Onomastics would place him in the extended family of Odo I, Count of Orléans. The most recent studies make him a son of Robert, Count of Oberrheingau and Wormsgau, and Waldrada, a daughter of Count Odo of Orléans. If this theory is true, he was the elder brother of Robert the Strong.

Like the rest of his family, he was a loyal follower of Charles the Bald. Though well endowed with estates in Austrasia, like his brother Robert, he abandoned these after the Treaty of Verdun (843) in order to rejoin Charles the Bald. In 846, he was granted lands in the region of Châteaudun, made Count of Anjou, and wed to Wandilmodis.

In 852, after the death of Aleran, Count of Troyes, he was nominated to hold his vacant office and his brother Robert succeeded him in Anjou. In 853, he participated in the Capitulary of Servais as missi in conjunction with Bishop Wenilo of Sens. In 858, Charles named his son Louis the Stammerer to the ducatus Cenomannicus and Robert, angered by his loss of influence there, revolted and called in the aid of Louis the German. Odo soon joined him. The brothers were subsequently expelled from their counties and Troyes confiscated and confided to one Rudolph.

Odo may have recovered Troyes after Rudolph's death (866), but perhaps not. In any case, his brother made his submission in 861 and was given the March of Neustria. Odo's eponymous son was found in Troyes in 876. By Wandilmodis, he left three children:

- Odo II, Count of Troyes
- Robert I, Count of Troyes
- a daughter who married Emenon
