= Odo II of Troyes =

Odo (or Eudes) II was a son of Odo I and Wandilmodis. He became the Count of Troyes on 25 October 877.

Little is known of this count. His father had the county of Troyes confiscated by Charles the Bald in 858, but whether he recovered it (circa 866) is uncertain, as are the circumstances of Odo's appointment. He may have inherited it from his father or been nominated by the king. He inherited some possessions in the region of Châteaudun and some historians have retrospectively called him "Count of Châteaudun."

By a charter dated 25 October 877, Charles the Bald ceded Chaource, in Tonnerre, to Odo. In 879, he was succeeded by his brother Robert I.

Preceded by Odo I	Count of Troyes; 876	Succeeded by Robert I
