= Odo of Beauvais =

Odo of Beauvais may refer to

- Bishop Odo I of Beauvais (died 881)
- Bishop Odo II of Beauvais (died 1144)
- Bishop Odo III of Beauvais (died 1148)
