= Pentemont Abbey =

Abbey in Paris, France

- Abbaye de Penthemont
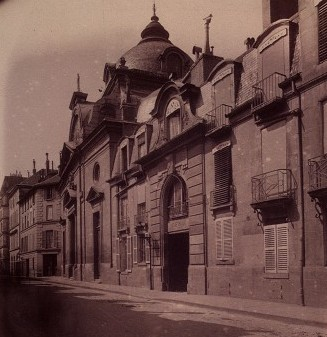
- Pentemont Abbey from Rue de Grenelle in 1898 by Eugène Atget

- Location within Paris

Monastery information
- Full name: L'Abbaye Royale de Notre-Dame de Penthemont
- Order: Cistercians
- Established: 1217
- Disestablished: 1790
- Diocese: Beauvais (1217–1672), Paris (1672–1790)

People
- Founders: Philippe de Dreux, Milo of Nanteuil
- Important associated figures: Joséphine de Beauharnais, Louise Adélaïde de Bourbon, Louise d'Esparbès de Lussan, Martha Jefferson Randolph, Mary Jefferson Eppes, James Smithson

Architecture
- Status: disestablished
- Heritage designation: Class MH(1983) Facades, roofs, grand salon and chapel Inscribed MH(1983) Facade and roof of the Court of Honor; Inscribed MH(1992) Central salon and first floor
- Architect: Pierre Contant d'Ivry (1756), Victor Baltard (1844)
- Groundbreaking: 1756
- Completed date: 1783

Site
- Location: 37 Rue de Bellechasse – Principal buildings, 39 Rue de Bellechasse – Hôtel du Génie, 104 Rue de Grenelle – Pavillon de Penthemont, 106 Rue de Grenelle – Temple Penthemont; 7th arrondissement of Paris, France
- Coordinates: 48°51′25.1″N 2°19′18.6″E

Pentemont Abbey (French: Abbaye de Penthemont, Pentemont, Panthemont or Pantemont) is a set of 18th and 19th-century buildings at the corner of Rue de Grenelle and Rue de Bellechasse in the 7th arrondissement of Paris. The complex had originally been a Cistercian nunnery. The abbey was founded near Beauvais in 1217 and moved to its current site in Paris in 1672 at the behest of King Louis XIV. A reconstruction of the abbey was initiated in 1745 by the Abbess Marie-Catherine Béthisy de Mézières and work was completed in 1783. In the late 18th century, the abbey was one of the most prestigious educational institutions in Paris for daughters of the elite, including Thomas Jefferson's daughters Martha and Mary. The abbey also provided rooms for ladies of good standing who were in search of rest, including Joséphine de Beauharnais when the case of her separation from her first husband was heard.

The abbey was disestablished during the French Revolution and the buildings were turned over to military use, first as the home of the National Guard, then the Imperial Guard, and later the Cent-gardes. It continues to be occupied by the Ministère de la Défense with the exception of the former chapel, which since 1844 has been a Protestant church, the Temple de Pentemont. In August 2014 the Ministry of Defence, facing budget cuts due to austerity policies, sold the buildings to a real estate investment trust, Foncière des 6ème et 7ème Arrondissements de Paris, with plans to move all ministry offices out of the abbey by the end of October, 2016.

== History ==
=== Beauvais (1217–1672) ===
Original location of the Abbey from 1217-1672 southwest of Beauvais in Picardy

Philip of Dreux, the famed crusader bishop of Beauvais, wished to found a convent of the Cistercian order. In 1217 he set aside an orchard southwest of Beauvais, on which were traced out the plans for construction, as well as seven arpents (6-7 acres) of vines. Philip died before the project was completed and his successor, Bishop Milo of Nanteuil, raised the rest of the funds, and it was completed in 1218. Pope Gregory IX issued a bull from the Lateran Palace on the 8 June 1230 which sanctioned the new abbey and declared the funds raised for its endowment protected. The abbey took its name, meaning mountain slope, from its location at the foot of the Montagne de St-Symphorien.

In 1554 the abbey provided refuge to Charlotte I de Monceaux, the abbess of the neighboring Abbey of Saint-Paul, whose election as abbess was opposed by Henry II. She fled to Pentemont after the arrival of the king's soldiers at her own abbey. However, they followed her to Pentemont and demanded by force that she renounce her position, a request to which she was compelled to accede.

In 1671, after the abbey was damaged in a flood, and for economic and geographical reasons, the abbess Hélène de Tourville moved the abbey to Paris. At the time, the convent had twelve sisters. The previous building was demolished and returned to agricultural work as part of the Pentemont farm.

=== Paris (1672–1790) ===
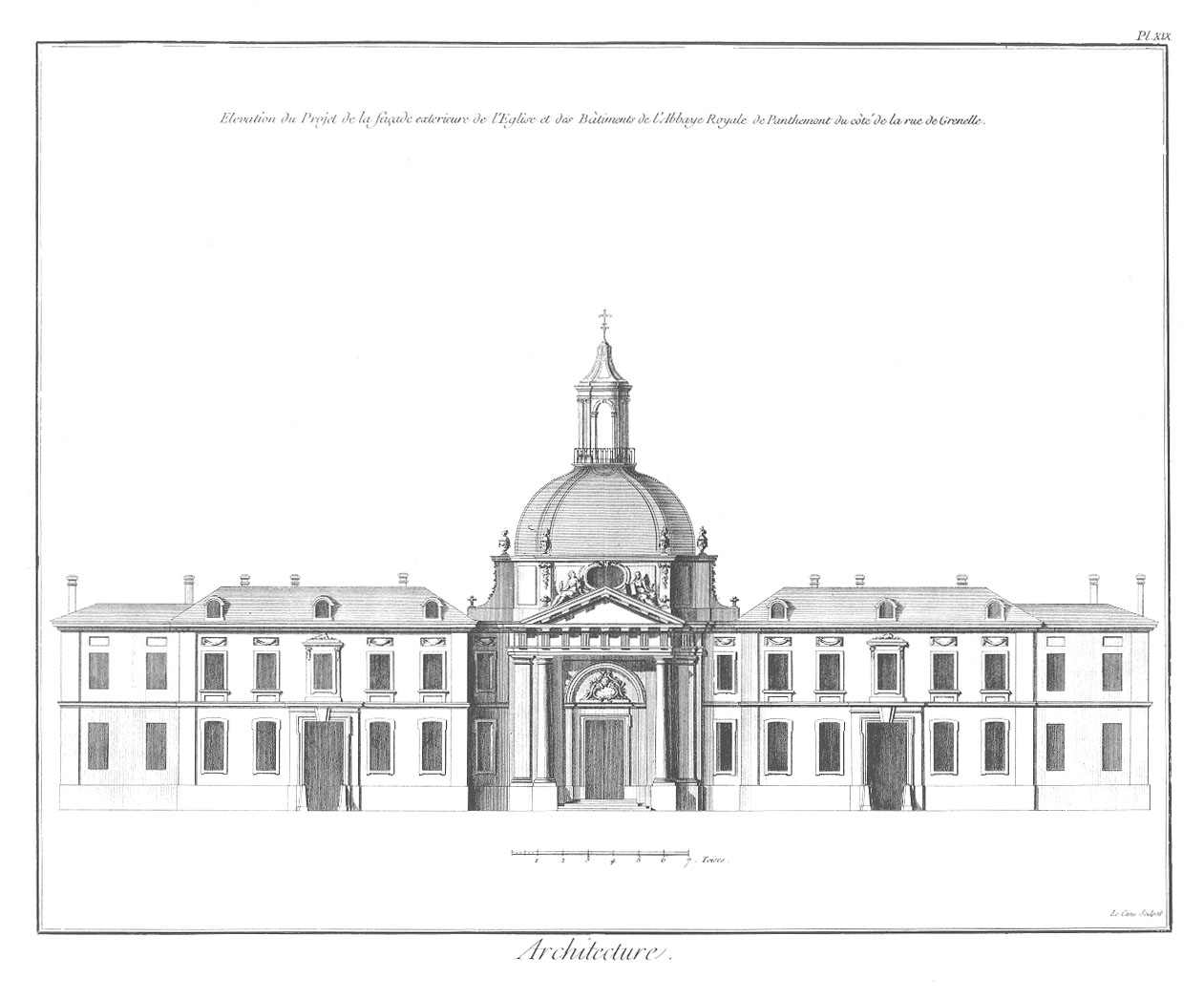
The unsuccessful proposal by François II Franque for the rebuilt Pentemont Abbey, as found in the Encyclopédie

In Paris the abbey took up residence in a former convent, recently suppressed, of the Sisters of the Incarnate Word, located on Rue de Grenelle at the current site of the abbey. The sisters dedicated themselves to the education of young women and later added rooms in which women of good standing could find rest. The abbey quickly acquired a distinguished reputation and by the time of its dissolution in 1790 had revenues of 58,000 livres, a great sum for the era.

The final abbess, Marie III Catherine de Béthisy de Mézières, spent 45 years and a great deal of money rebuilding and expanding the abbey. A competition for plans for a reconstruction attracted multiple proposals including one from the royal architect, François II Franque, which drew praise from Denis Diderot in the Encyclopédie for its combination of grandeur and simplicity. The winning proposal, however, was from Pierre Contant d'Ivry.

The many famous students educated at the abbey included the noted abbess and princess Louise Adélaïde de Bourbon, and Louise d'Esparbès de Lussan, the mistress of the Count of Artois, the future King Charles X. Thomas Jefferson's daughters Martha and Mary were both educated at the Pentemont Abbey while he was Minister to France. Their entry into the school was sponsored by the wife of the Marquis de Lafayette. The future first lady Abigail Adams was shocked that Jefferson would send his girls to a Catholic school but he assured her that there were many Protestants at the abbey. Conditions were austere for the students, despite the presence of three princesses, with no fires until the water froze and a prohibition on speaking outside of class and recreation. Her time at the school led Martha, nicknamed Patsy, to write a letter to her father expressing her desire to become a nun. Jefferson quickly removed his daughters from the care of the convent.

The abbey also provided elegant apartments to highborn women seeking independence from families or difficult marriages. The ladies were free to come and go as they liked, with constraints on the hours allowed outside the convent, often had their children and servants with them, and spent their evenings socializing and commiserating in the abbey's salons. One such resident was Joséphine de Beauharnais, the future Empress of France, during her separation from her first husband, Alexandre de Beauharnais. The court granted her temporary independence from her husband and required her to stay at Pentemont with her children at the expense of Alexandre. It is also speculated that James Smithson, the founder of the Smithsonian Institution, who was born in Paris the illegitimate son of the Duke of Northumberland, was born in the Pentemont Abbey, as it had strong connections to the Duke, whose illegitimate daughters it educated.

=== State Property (1790–2015) ===
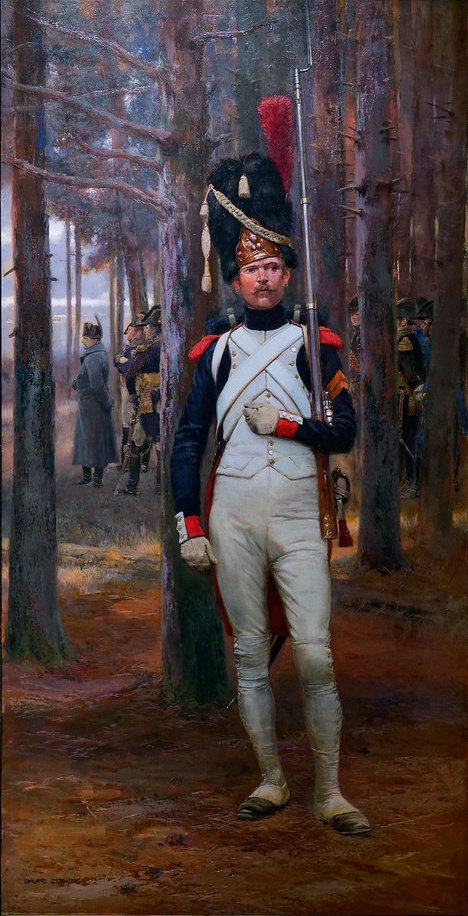
A grenadier of the Imperial Guard, which was headquartered at Pentemont Abbey

==== Military ====
During the French Revolution, the Abbey was suppressed and its properties confiscated. The abbey's affairs were wound down in 1791–92, with its properties in Beauvais sold to pay off state debt. With the abbey now state property it came to serve first as home to the National Guard, then the Imperial Guard. In 1835, the building was expanded to Rue de Bellechasse which required the demolition of some parts of the original structure. Under the Second Empire the abbey served as the barracks of the Cent-gardes Squadron, an elite cavalry unit that provided personal protection for Napoleon III and the Tuileries Palace.

In the twentieth century, Pentemont Abbey housed the Ministry of War Pensions, Bonuses and Benefits. In 1937, a bunker was constructed underneath the Court of Honor including two stationary bicycles intended to provide electricity in case of power loss due to enemy bombardment. The courtyard has a war memorial that reads "From veterans to their comrades who gave their lives for their country. In memoriam." It is also home to a number of commemorative plaques, including ones for André Maginot and Henri Frenay.

==== Protestant Church ====
The chapel was used to store grain during the Revolution and later hay when the army took over the abbey. After the Concordat of 1801 provided formal recognition of the Reformed Church in France, it was decided that three former Catholic churches in Paris be turned over to Reformed congregations, Saint-Louis-du-Louvre, Sainte-Marie-des-Anges, and the chapel of the Pentemont Abbey.

In 1598, Protestant worship had been forbidden in Paris by the Edict of Nantes. In 1685, the Edict of Fontainebleau made non-Catholic services illegal in all of France. This inaugurated a long period of persecution for French Protestants though some in Paris were able to worship in the chapels of the Dutch and Swedish embassies. The handover of the chapel of the abbey as well as the other churches ushered in a new era of open Protestant worship in Paris.

The actual opening of the former abbey as a Reformed congregation was delayed by decades of bureaucratic obstacles as well as opposition during the Bourbon Restoration to turning over a former Catholic building to Protestant use. It was not until 1844 that architect Victor Baltard began work to convert the chapel into a Protestant church. He isolated the chapel from the rest of the building, added new doors in place of two of the previous windows, and converted the former choir to a nave. He also closed off the original entrance by adding a massive organ, built by Aristide Cavaillé-Coll and installed in 1846 for the opening of the church. The organ has undergone various modifications over the years including a restoration from 2011 to 2014 to restore the remaining original elements. The church itself underwent restoration from 2005 to 2007 commissioned by the City of Paris and accomplished by Benjamin Mouton, the chief architect of historic monuments, and the firm Aubert-Labansat.

== List of Abbesses of Pentemont ==
- 1219–1236 : Agnès, first prioress
- 1236–1264 : Marguerite I, first abbesse
- 1264–12?? : Isabelle
- 12??–12?? : Ide
- 12??–1300 : Marie I
- 1300–1358 : Marguerite II
- 1358–1375 : Marguerite III de Vuault
- 1375–1415 : Marguerite IV de Rinceville
- 1415–1428 : Henriette
- 1428–1441 : Marthe Maquerelle
- 1441–1479 : Nicole
- 1479–1496 : Marguerite V
- 1496–1516 : Anne I du Castel
- 1516–1521 : Marguerite VI Trisel
- 1521–1530 : Anne II
- 1530–1552 : Huguette de Creilly
- 1552–1562 : Françoise I Ogier de Berry
- 1562–1567 : Françoise II de Fontaines
- 1567–1568 : Catherine I Loisel de Flanbermont
- 1568–1586 : Marguerite VII Loisel de Flanbermont
- 1586–1623 : Catherine II de Guiverlay
- 1623–1633 : Charlotte I de Cavoye
- 1633–1641 : Jeanne I Thierry
- 1641–1644 : Jeanne II Ogier de Berry
- 1644–1667 : Françoise III Le Charon
- 1667–1715 : Hélène de Costentin de Tourville
- 1715–1719 : Charlotte II de Colbert-Croissy
- 1719–1743 : Marie II Anne-Bénigne-Constance-Julie de Rohan-Guéménée
- 1743–1790 : Marie III Catherine de Béthisy de Mézières

Source: Le Fèvre, A.M. (1747). Calendrier historique et chronologique de l'Église de Paris. Paris, C. Herissant fils.

== Gallery ==
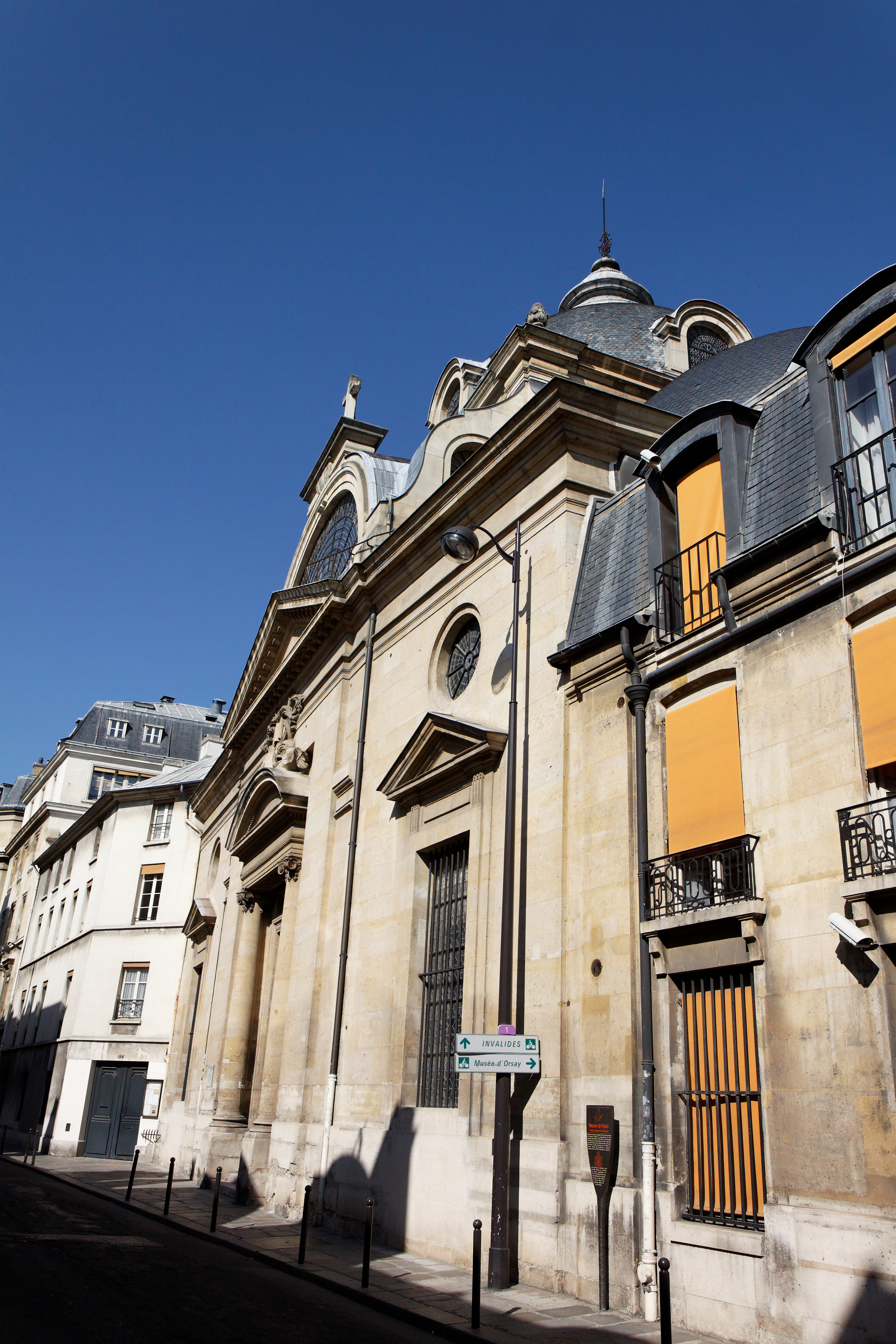
The abbey chapel, now a Protestant church

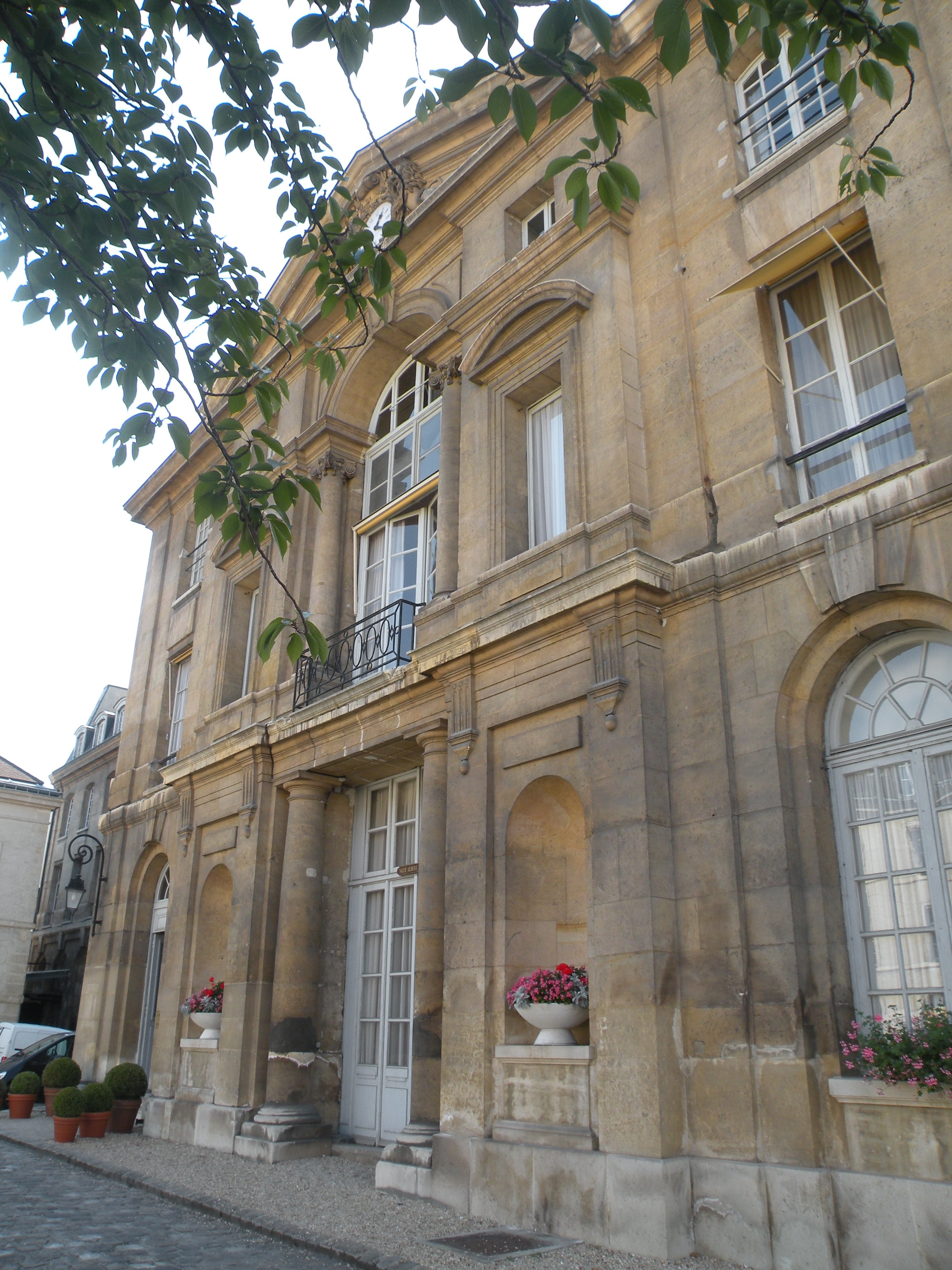
Entrance from the Court of Honor

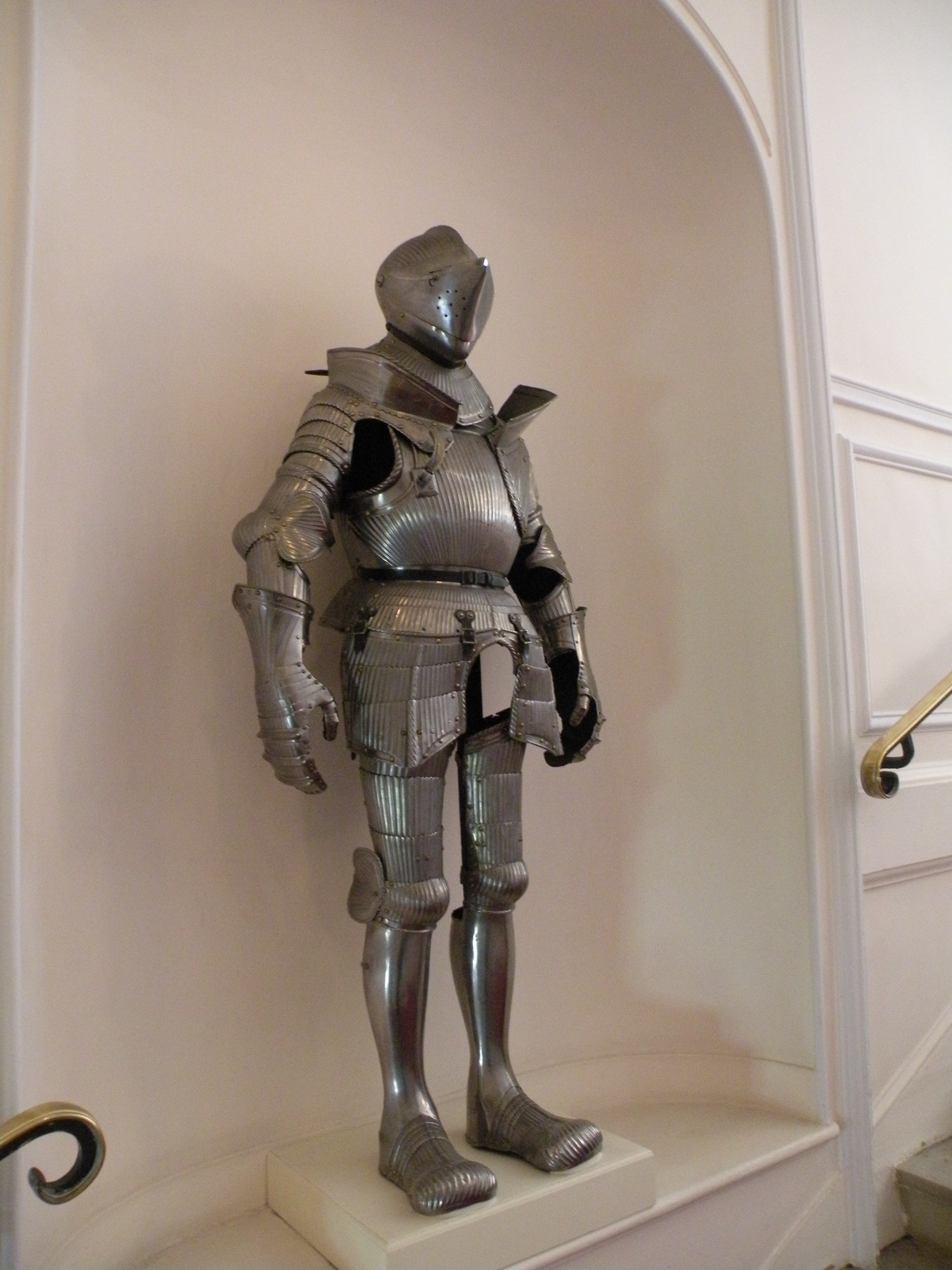
Armor

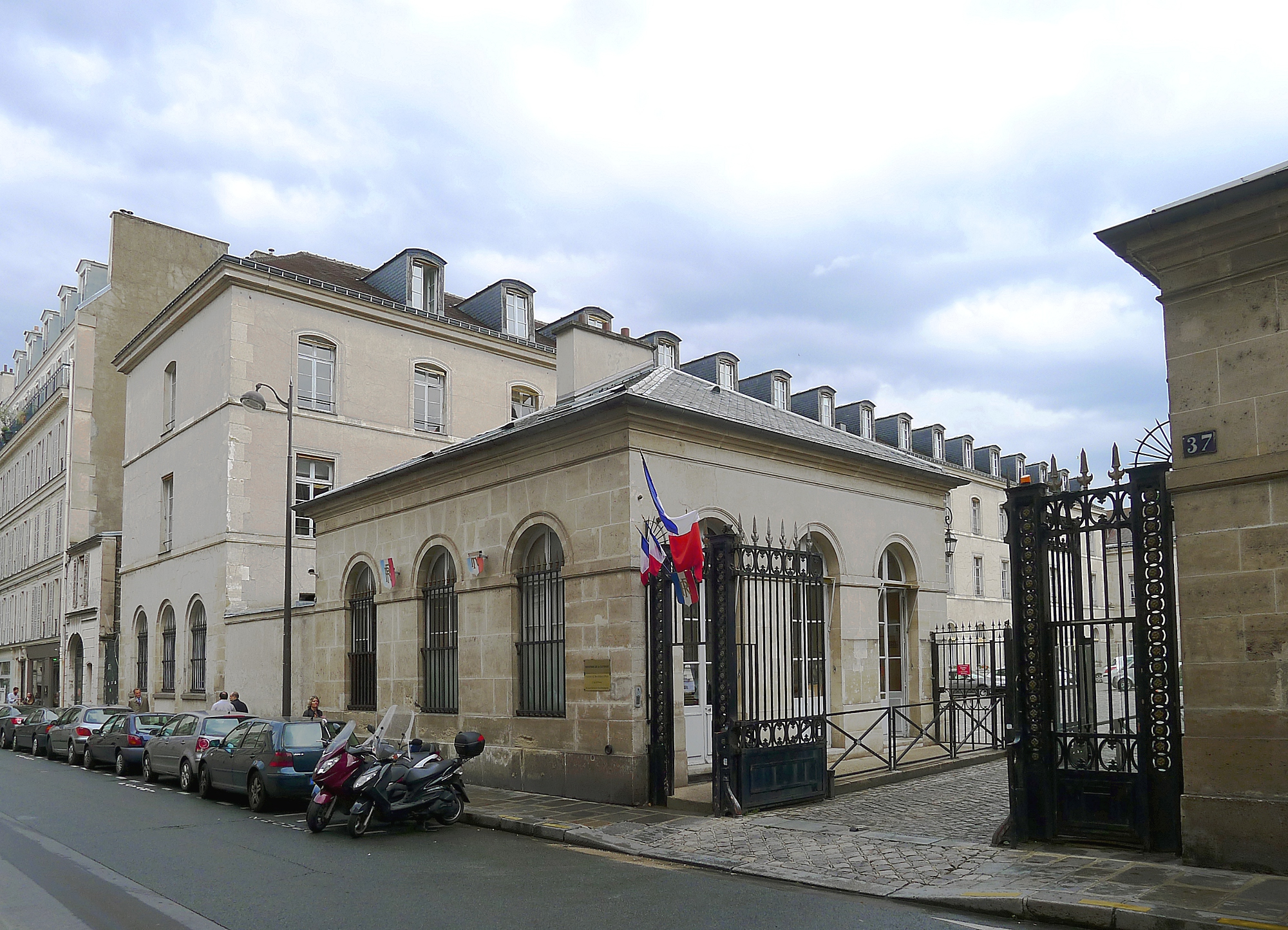
Entrance from Rue de Bellechasse

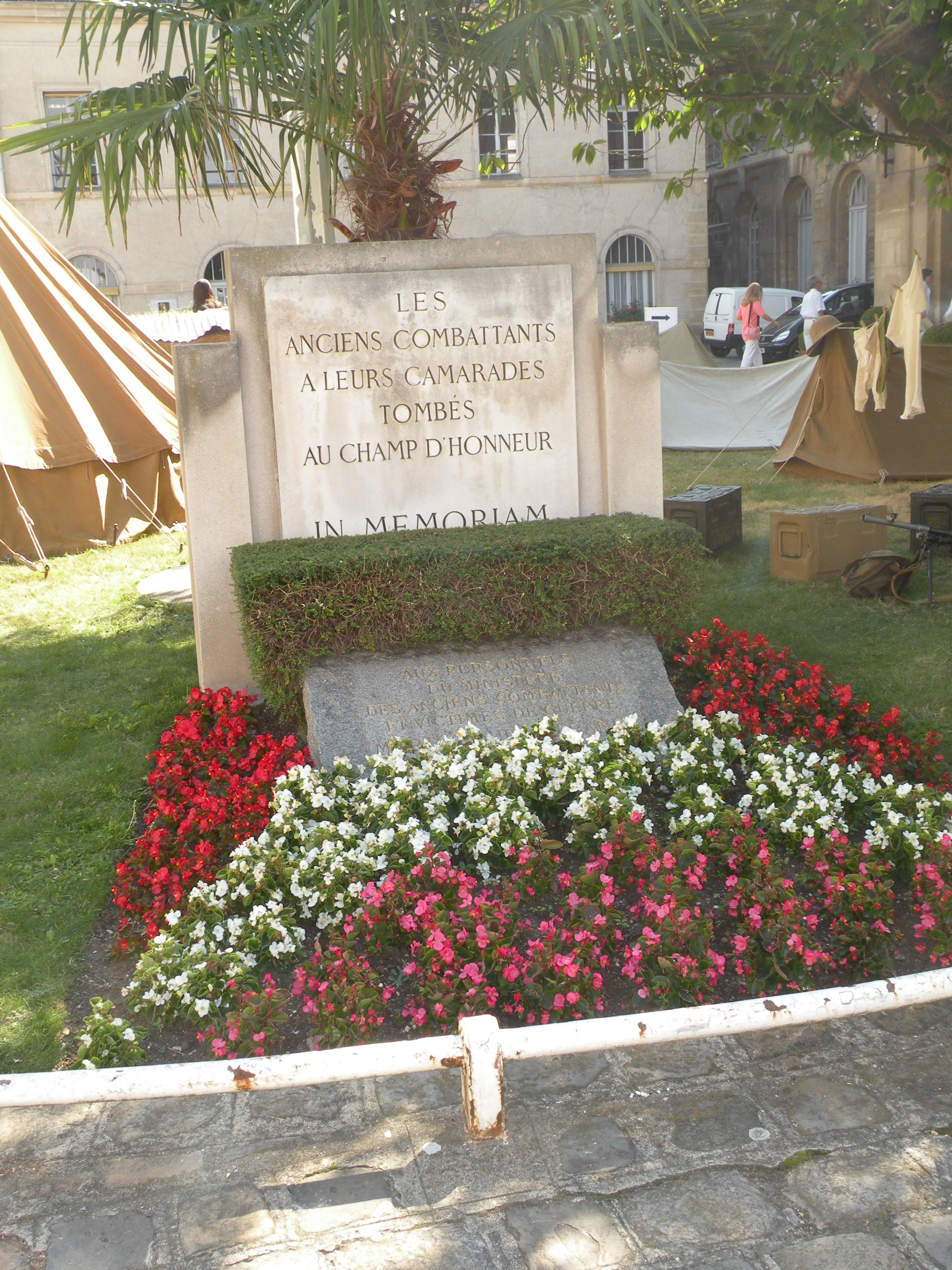
Memorial to fallen soldiers

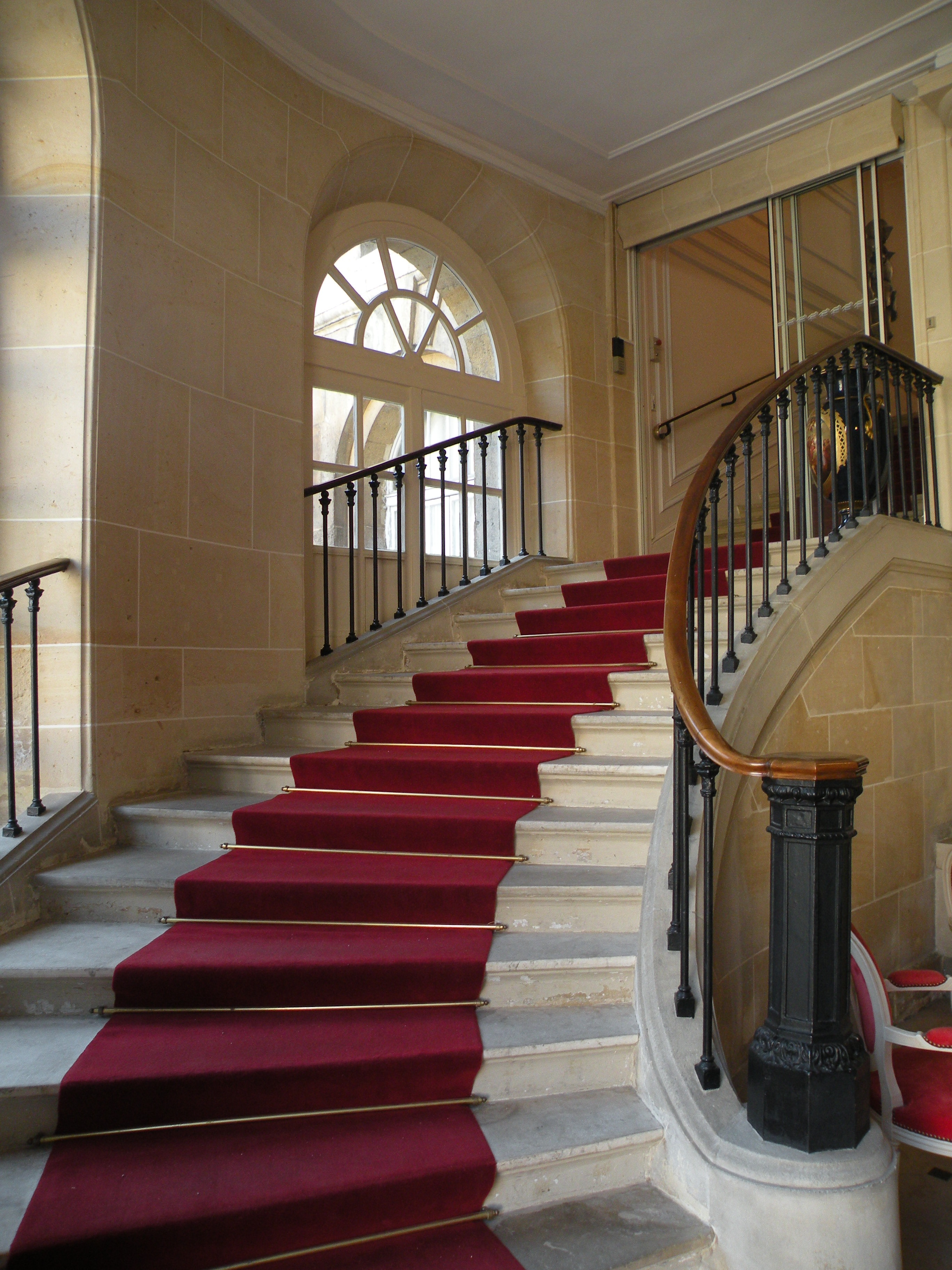
Staircase

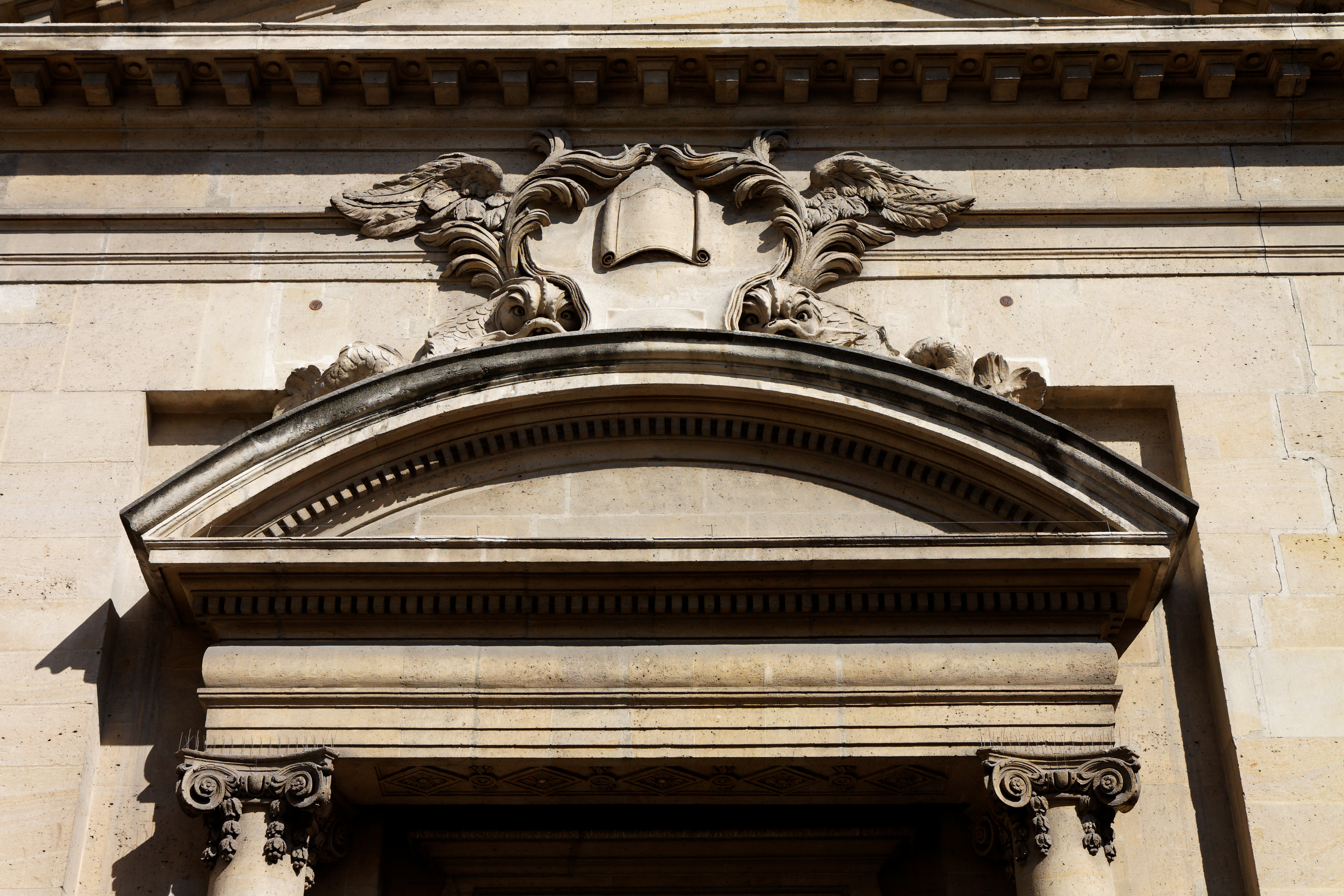
Entrance from Rue de Grenelle

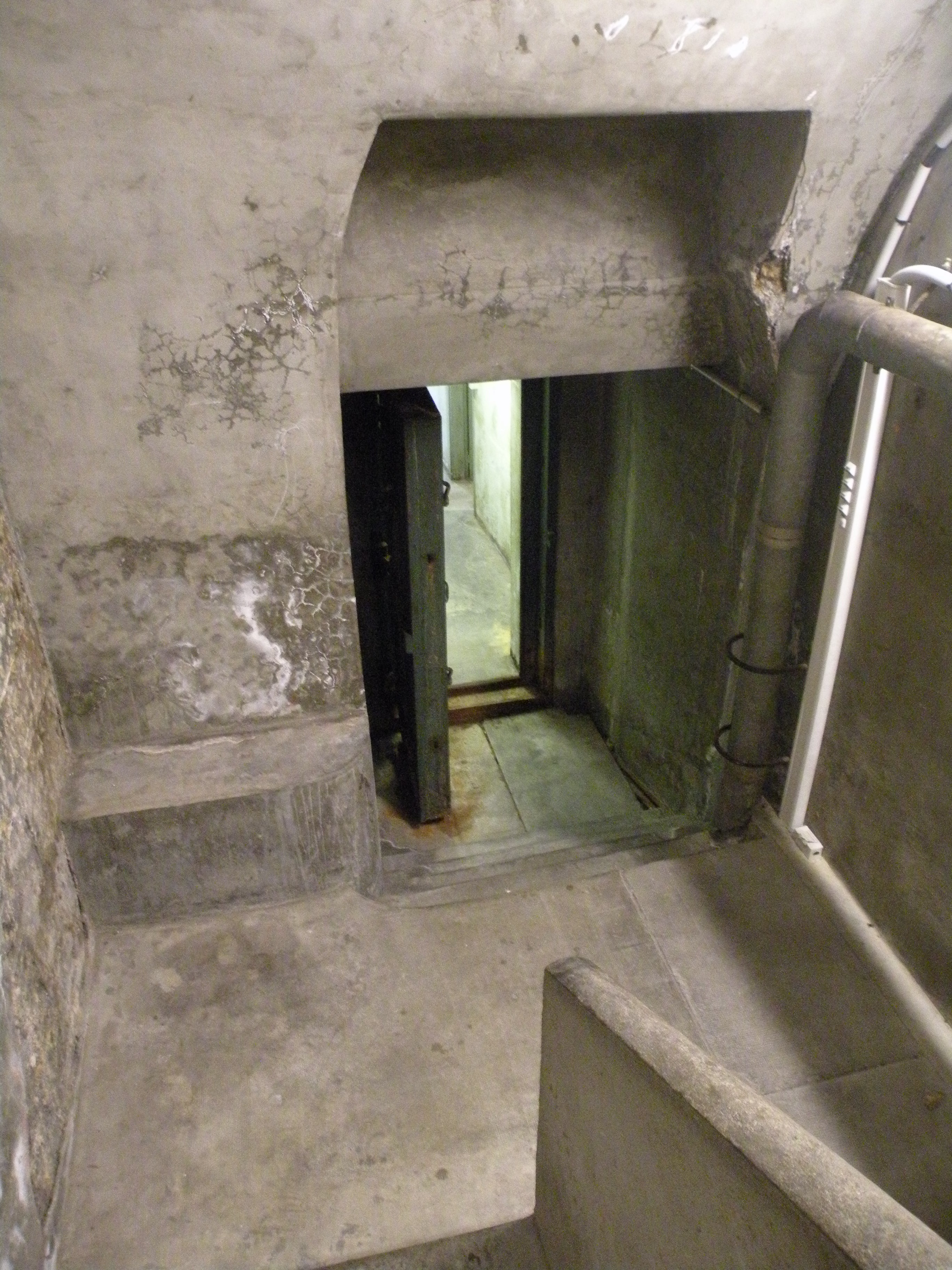
Entrance to the 1930s era bunker built beneath the Court of Honor

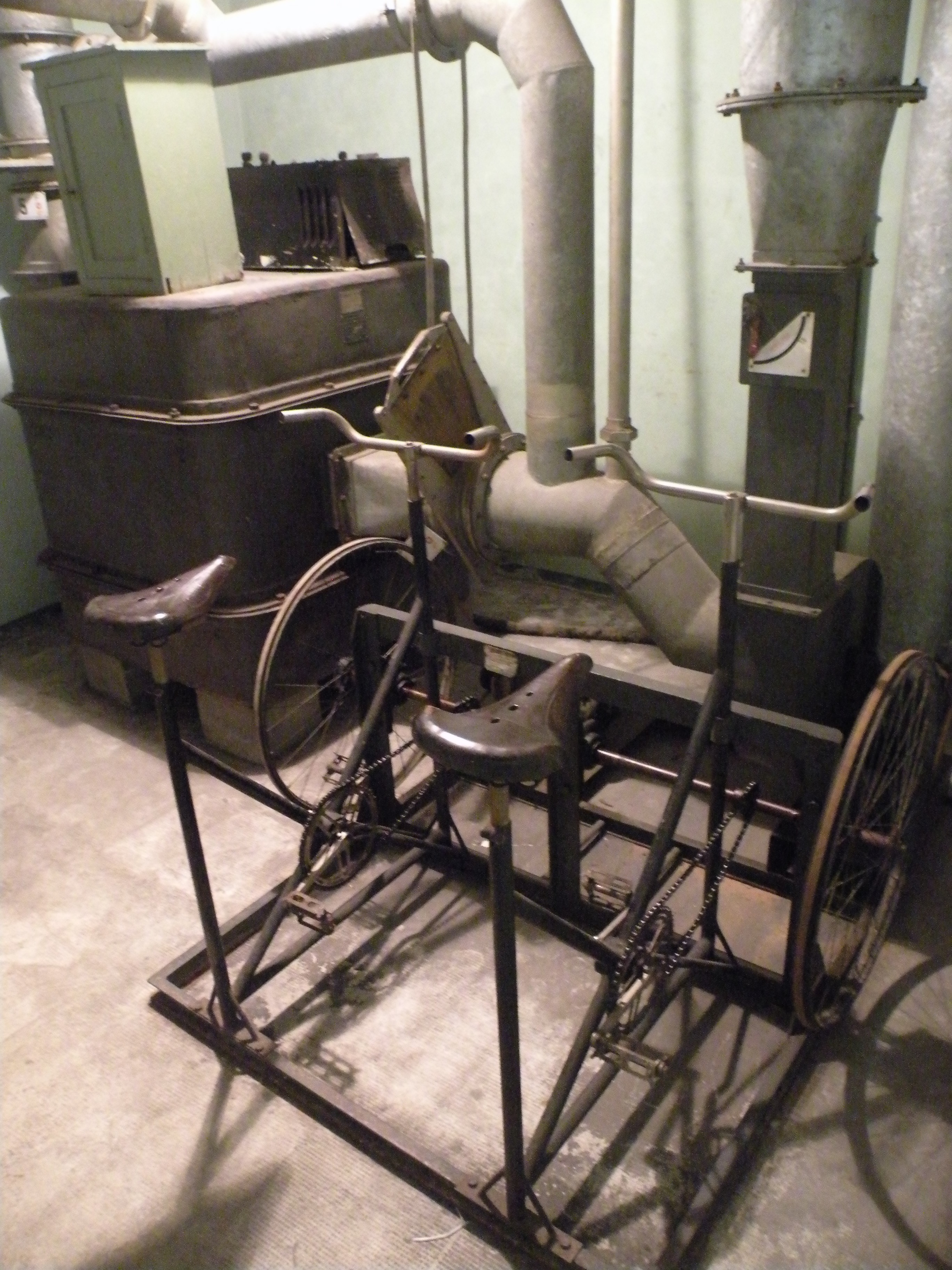
Bicycles inside the bunker intended to provide electricity

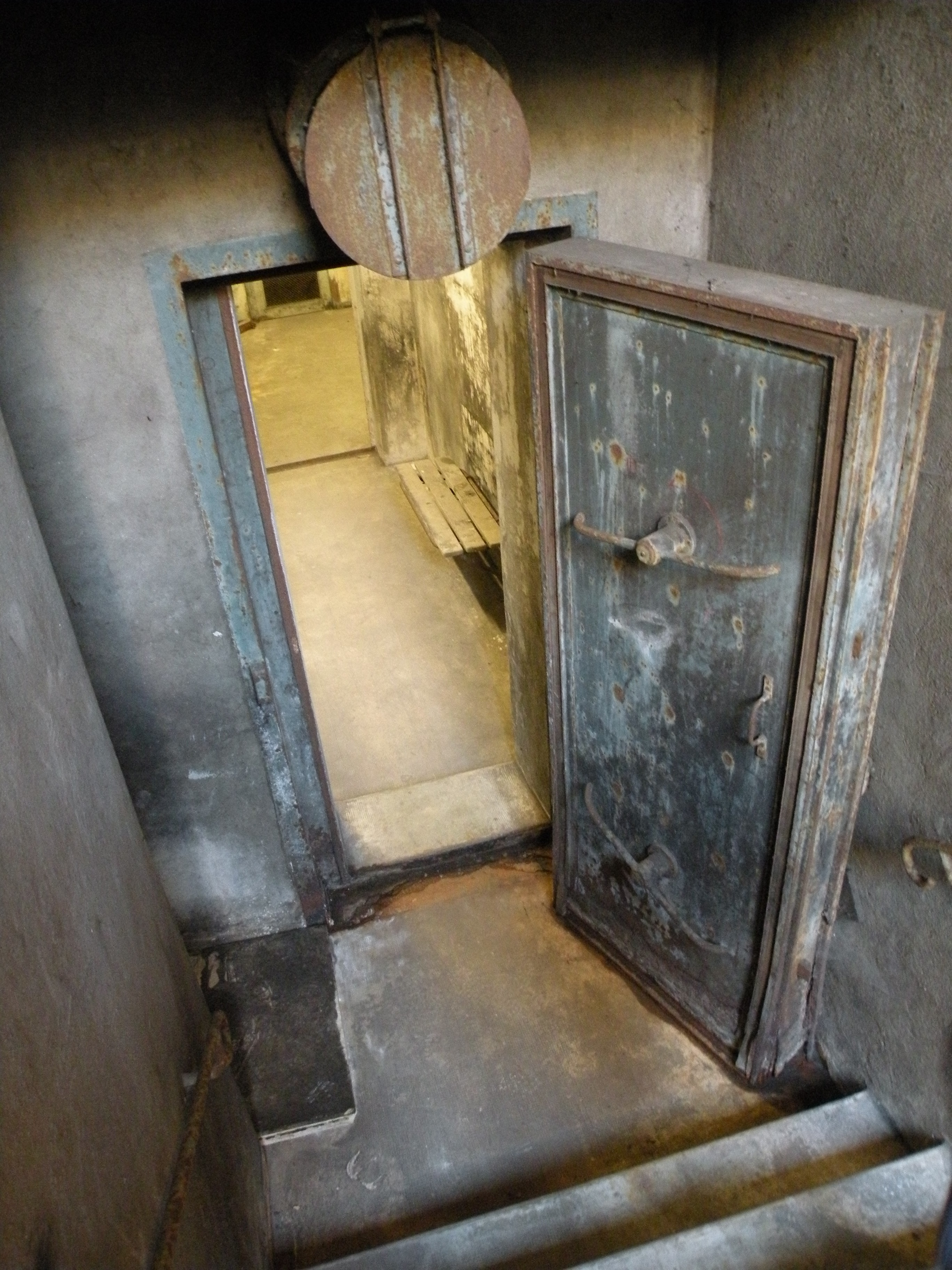
Bunker door

== Bibliography ==
- Jean-Marie Pérouse de Montclos (dir.), Le guide du patrimoine. Paris, Paris, Hachette, 1994
- François Rousseau, « Histoire de l'Abbaye de Pentemont, depuis sa translation à Paris jusqu'à la Révolution », Mémoires de la société de l'histoire de Paris et de l'Île-de-France, v. XLV, 1918, p. 171
