= Odo II =

Odo II may refer to

- Odo II of Troyes (9th century)
- Odo II, Count of Orléans (c. 852–898)
- Odo II of Blois (983–1037)
- Odo II, Margrave of the Saxon Ostmark (d. 1046)
- Odo of Champagne (c. 1040 – 1115)
- Odo II of Beauvais (died 1144), bishop
- Odo II, Duke of Brittany since 1148
- Odo II of Burgundy (1118–1162)
- Odo II of Champlitte (died in 1204)
