= Odo III =

Odo III may refer to:

- Odo III, Count of Troyes (983–1037)
- Odo III of Beauvais (died 1148), bishop
- Odo III, Duke of Burgundy (1166–1218)
