= Odo I =

Odo I may refer to:

- Odo I, Count of Orléans (9th century)
- Odo I of Troyes (9th century)
- Odo I of Beauvais (died 881), bishop
- Odo I, Margrave of the Saxon Ostmark (d. 993)
- Odo I of Blois (c. 950 – 996)
- Odo I of Burgundy (1058–1103)
