= Lucien of Beauvais =

Christian martyr

Saint Saint Lucian of Beauvais
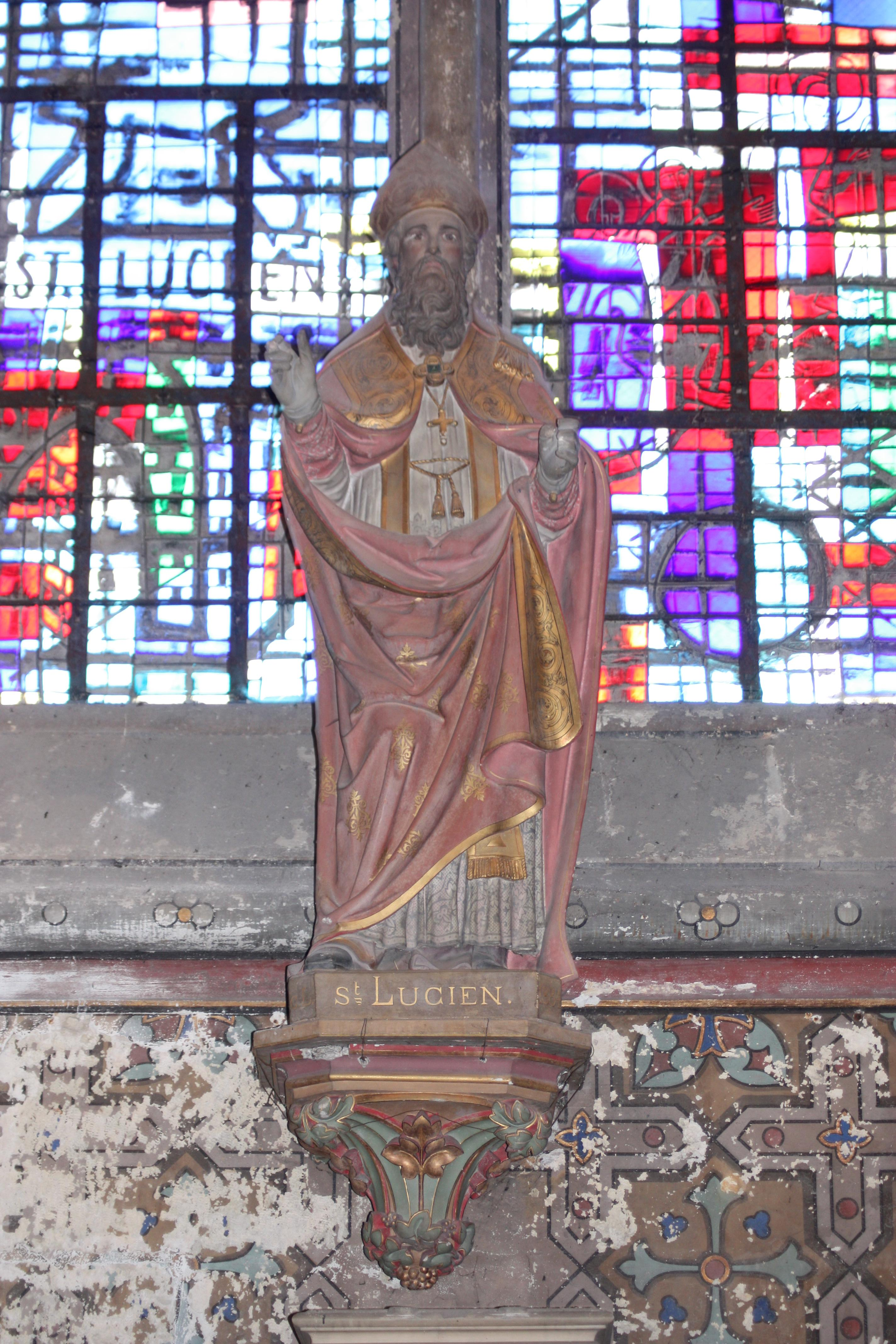
- Statue of St. Lucien, Cathedral of Beauvais.

Apostle of Beauvais
- Died: c. 290 AD; Beauvais
- Venerated in: Roman Catholic Church; Orthodox Church; Anglican Church
- Major shrine: Formerly the cathedral of Beauvais
- Feast: 8 January, 3 June (Orthodox Church only).
- Patronage: Beauvais

Saint Lucian of Beauvais (French: Lucien, Latin: Lucianus, died c. 290 AD) is a Christian martyr of the Catholic Church, called the "Apostle of Beauvais." He was killed in the 3rd century during the Diocletian persecution, although later traditions make him a martyr of the 1st century instead. This was because the church of Beauvais attempted to claim apostolic origins for itself. Odo, bishop of Beauvais during the 9th century, was the first writer to designate Lucien as the first bishop of Beauvais.

Nevertheless, the foundation of the diocese of Beauvais is traditionally attributed to him. His Passio assigns him two disciples, Maximian (Maxien, Maximien) and Julian (Julien), who were decapitated with him on the hill of Montmille.

French historian Louis Duchesne (and others) consider the whole story of Lucian as unhistorical.

== Legend ==
The details of his life are largely unknown; the date of his death was moved backwards in time in order to lend his see more antiquity, a common practice during the Middle Ages. As Hippolyte Delehaye writes, "To have lived amongst the Saviour's immediate following was...honorable...and accordingly old patrons of churches were identified with certain persons in the gospels or who were supposed to have had some part of Christ's life on earth."

Tradition holds he came from a noble family of Rome. He was named "Lucius" like his father, but when he was converted to Christianity by Saint Peter himself, he took the name of Lucian. As a young man, he preached in Italy and then he was ordained bishop by Pope Clement I (who actually lived in a different century), who sent him to Gaul with Saint Denis and Rieul of Reims, among others (Lucian is also called an associate of Saint Quentin), to preach there. He was imprisoned in Parma, but was freed by Christians there. He converted people in Pavia before arriving in Arles, where he once again met up with Saint Rieul. Denis and Lucian continued towards Lutetia. Marcellinus and those accompanying him continued on to Spain. Denis remained in Lutetia while Lucian continued onto Beauvais, at the time known as Caesaromagus.

At Beauvais, he acquired fame for his mortifications and penances. He preached against the Roman gods. He lived in a house that is considered to be the place now occupied by the collegiate church of Saint-Nicolas. Denis and Rieul visited him here. According to Rolandus, the author of Acta Sancti Luciani, he retired to a mountain near the city, living as a hermit on grass and water. According to one account, he converted 30,000 people to Christianity, and was assisted in this task by his 2 disciples.

The assassins Latinus, Jarius and Antor were sent by the Roman Emperor (his legendary account gives the contradictory name of Diocletian, though this emperor lived during the 3rd century) to kill him. They killed his disciples first and then beat Lucian with rods, finally slicing his head off. His legend states that after Lucian was decapitated, he picked up his head and walked towards the town of Beauvais. Having crossed the river Thérain at Miauroy (Beauvais lies at the foot of wooded hills on the left bank of the Thérain at its confluence with the Avelon), Lucian stopped within a quarter mile of Beauvais, and died there, thus indicating to his followers that he wanted to be buried on that very spot. This part of his legend thus makes Lucian one of the legendary cephalophores, whose number also include his alleged companion, Denis.

According to the legend, the angels themselves attended the funeral of the saint, and according to local tradition, vermilion-coloured rosebushes blossomed on the spot where Lucian's blood had run.

== Veneration ==
Lucian's body was buried in the cemetery of Thil. His name occurred in the calendar of the Book of Common Prayer from an early date.

At the end of the Christian persecutions, a church was built over his tomb; it was called the Church of Saints Peter and Lucian. It was destroyed in the 5th century. Around 583, at the request of Dodo, bishop of Beauvais, and Saint Evrou (Evrost), Chilperic I ordered the building of a new basilica and monastery on the same site. Dodo consecrated the church, dedicating it once again to Saints Peter and Lucian. Saint Evrou served as abbot of the monastery. The abbey was destroyed in 845 during the Norman invasions, but a new one was built in the 12th century, serving also as a burial place for the cathedral canons. During the Middle Ages, a priory was also built on the alleged site of their death, at Montmille, which became a place of pilgrimage.

In 1261, the relics of Lucian, Maximian, and Julian were placed in a new reliquary by William of Grès (Guillaume de Grès), bishop of Beauvais. The translation took place in the presence of St. Louis IX, king of France, and Theobald II, king of Navarre, and much of the French nobility. The memory of this translation was formerly celebrated in the abbey of Beauvais as the fête des Corps Saints.

On 5 January 1791, the abbey was put on sale and was bought by a rich Parisian, Vicente Alterio. The liturgical objects were transported to the church of Notre-Dame du-Thil. The basilica and the monastery were demolished between 1795 and 1819. Of the monastery, only the round tower and part of the wall remain.

On 20 November 1793, Lucian's relics were tossed into a fire by Protestant extremists.

In the Orthodox Church, Lucian is commemorated on 3 June and 8 January (See Wikipedia's Eastern Orthodox Liturgics).
