= Galon (bishop of Beauvais) =

French Catholic bishop

Galon or Gallon (Galo, Gallo, Walo) was a bishop of Beauvais (c. 1099-1104) and later Bishop of Paris (1104–1116). He was appointed a papal legate in Poland by Paschal II c. 1103.

Born in Beauvais, Galon became Abbot of Saint-Quentin, later enthroned a bishop thanks to the papal support of Paschal II. As a legate he supervised the course of Gregorian reform in the Polish Church. He summoned a council that deposed two bishops for disobeying the Canons including Cracovian Cazlaus (Czasław), who had married. Galon was also first to bring to Poland the canon law collection Collectio trium partium, a work of his master St. Ivo, medieval canonist and Bishop of Chartres.

Galon was present at Council of Châlons in 1115. He died February 23, 1116.
