= Philip of Dreux =

Bishop of Beauvais (1158–1217)

- Bishop of Beauvais
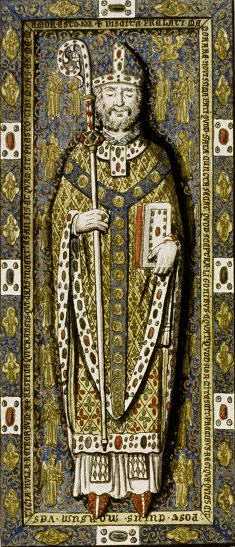
- Installed: 1175
- Term ended: 1217
- Predecessor: Bartholomew of Montcornet
- Successor: Milo of Nanteuil

Personal details
- Born: 1158
- Died: 4 November 1217 (aged 58–59)
- Parents: Robert I of Dreux; Agnes of Baudemont

Philip of Dreux (French: Philippe; 1158–1217) was a French nobleman, Bishop of Beauvais, and figure of the Third Crusade. He was an active soldier, an ally in the field of Philip Augustus, the French king and his cousin, making him an opponent in campaigns in France and elsewhere of Richard I of England. He was also in demand as a priest, to make and break marriages. He presided over that of his cousin Conrad of Montferrat at the Siege of Acre, marrying him to Isabella I of Jerusalem, daughter of Amalric I, whose marriage he annulled. He was also a party to the annulment of the marriage between Philip Augustus and Ingeborg of Denmark.

== Life ==
Philip was the son of Robert I of Dreux and Agnes of Baudemont, and the brother of Robert II of Dreux.

He first campaigned in Palestine in 1180, in an expedition headed by Henry II of Champagne and Peter I of Courtenay. This attack on Saladin's holdings was ineffectual.

Robert II and Philip of Dreux arrived with forces in Palestine in 1189. They participated in the Siege of Acre as part of King Philip II's army, though when the King returned to France in July of 1191 they stayed as part of the remaining French Crusader forces under the command of Hugh III, Duke of Burgundy. They would both later participate in the Battle of Arsuf, though Philip would then retire to the city of Tyre in the aftermath of the victory.

Philip was present in Tyre on April 28th, 1192, where he dined with Conrad of Montferrat who had by then been named King of Jerusalem. As Conrad returned from Philip's quarters, he was ambushed by two Assassins and killed.

Richard the Lionheart bore him a consistent enmity after the Crusade; Philip of Dreux had been one of those relaying the rumour that Richard was responsible for the killing of Conrad. Subsequently Philip had gone to Germany, when Richard was imprisoned, to advocate against setting him free. There, Philip encouraged Richard's captors to treat him poorly, earning the lifelong hatred of Richard, who considered him "a robber and an incendiary".

He was captured by Angevin forces under the mercenary leader Mercadier and Prince John in a Normandy campaign, in 1197. Richard was still refusing to release him a year later, and again early in 1199. When Peter of Capua (who was trying to enlist Richard for the Fourth Crusade) insisted that Richard release Philip, Richard exploded and threatened to castrate Peter, so intense was his hatred of his prisoner Philip. Pope Celestine III was unsympathetic to Philip, confined at Rouen and then, after an escape attempt, at Chinon. He was freed only after Richard's death in 1199, with Richard's successor, John agreeing to exchange him for the captured bishop-elect of Cambrai in 1200.

In 1210 he was in action against the Cathars in southern France, with Renaud de Mouçon, bishop of Chartres, in support of Simon de Montfort.

He drew support from Philip Augustus in his conflict against Renaud de Dammartin, leading to Renaud's 1212 alliance with John. Philip was later a combatant on the victorious French side in 1214 at the Battle of Bouvines. He took a mace to William Longsword, Earl of Salisbury, at an important moment in the battle, leading to the Earl's capture.

In his last year as bishop he founded the Pentemont Abbey, a Cistercian convent whose later buildings in Paris remain to the present day.

== Sources ==
- Baldwin, John W. (2019). Knights, Lords, and Ladies: In Search of Aristocrats in the Paris Region, 1180–1220. University of Pennsylvania Press.
- Bennett, Stephen (2013). "Philippe de Dreux, Bishop of Beauvais: "A man more devoted to battles than books"". Medieval Warfare. 3 (2): 26–32. JSTOR 48578215.
- Bradbury, Jim (1998). Philip Augustus. Taylor & Francis.
- Gillingham, John (1989). Richard the Lionheart (2nd ed.). Times Books.
- Phillips, Jonathan (2004). The Fourth Crusade and the Siege of Constantinople. Viking.
- Runciman, Steven (1999a). A History of the Crusades. Vol. II: The Kingdom of Jerusalem and the Frankish East, 1100–1187. Cambridge University Press.
- Runciman, Steven (1999b). A History of the Crusades. Vol. III: The Kingdom of Acre and the Later Crusades. Cambridge University Press.
- Williams, Patrick (1970). "The Assassination of Conrad of Montferrat: Another Suspect?". Traditio. 26: 381–389. doi:10.1017/S0362152900005109. JSTOR 27830909.
