= Milo of Nanteuil =

French cleric and crusader

- Bishop of Beauvais
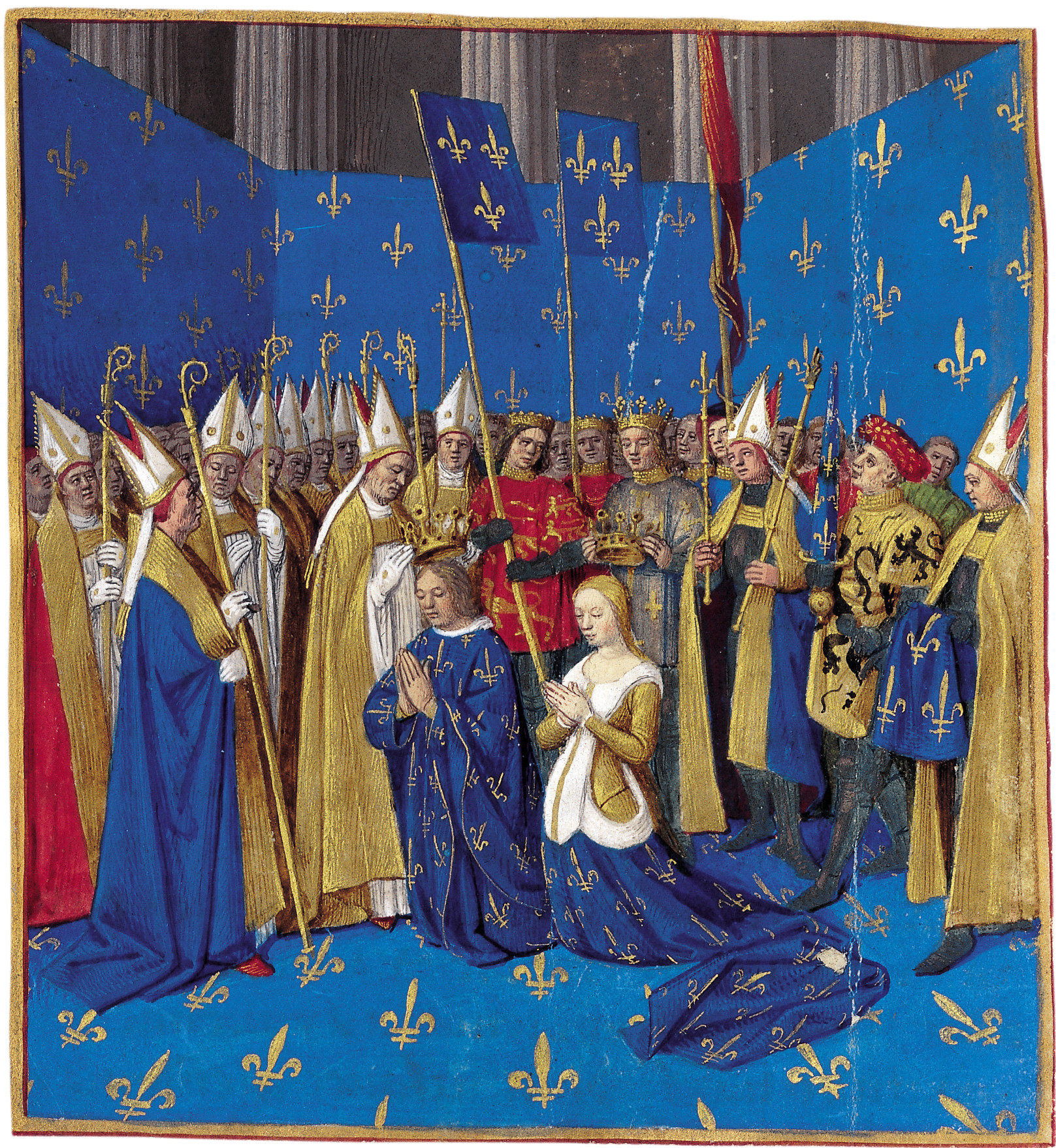
- Milo of Nanteuil on the far right holding the royal mantle for the Coronation of Louis VIII and Blanche of Castile at Reims in 1223
- Native name: Milon de Nanteuil
- Church: Roman Catholic
- Archdiocese: Reims
- Diocese: Beauvais
- Elected: 1218
- Term ended: 1234
- Predecessor: Philip of Dreux
- Successor: Godfrey of Clermont
- Previous post: Provost of the cathedral chapter of Reims (1207-17)

Personal details
- Died: 6 September 1234
- Parents: Gaucher I (of Châtillon) of Nanteuil-la-Fosse, Helvide of Nanteuil

Milo of Nanteuil (French: Milon or Miles de Nanteuil) was a French cleric and crusader. He served as the provost of the cathedral of Reims from 1207 to 1217 and then as bishop of Beauvais from 1218 until his death in September 1234.

Milo was the fourth son of Gaucher I, lord of Nanteuil-la-Fosse of the House of Châtillon. He combined an ambitious pursuit of ecclesiastical office with military service, the building of Beauvais Cathedral and the patronage of Jean Renart.

Milo was a repeat crusader. As a youth, he accompanied King Philip Augustus on the Third Crusade (1190) and was captured. He also took part in the Fifth Crusade (1217–1221), where he was captured at the Battle of Fariskur on 29 August 1219. He was consecrated bishop by Pope Honorius III upon his return in 1222. He accompanied Louis VIII on the Albigensian Crusade (1226) and was with the king at his deathbed. In 1229, with Bishop Hugh of Clermont, Milo brought French troops to Italy at the request of Pope Gregory IX to fight against Frederick II, Holy Roman Emperor, in the so-called War of the Keys. Milo's last years were marred by a conflict in Beauvais between the burgers, the bishop and the king, Louis IX. He opposed royal intervention, but died before the conflict was resolved.
