= Odo II of Beauvais =

French Catholic bishop

Odo II (or Eudes II; died 1144) was the bishop of Beauvais from 1133 until his death.

Odo was a close friend of Abbot Suger of Saint-Denis and he attended the dedication of the new Abbey of Saint-Denis in 1140, and may have attended the consecration in 1144. Through his close connexion to Suger he may have acquired the handsomely illustrated coronation ordo (liturgy) that was discovered in Beauvais Cathedral in the sixteenth century and is now Latin manuscript (lat.) 14192 in the Bibliothèque nationale.

== Sources ==
- Brown, Elizabeth A. R. (1992). "'Franks, Burgundians, and Aquitanians' and the Royal Coronation Ceremony in France". Transactions of the American Philosophical Society. New Series. 82 (7): i–xii + 1–189.
- Delettre, Charles (1842). Histoire du Diocèse de Beauvais depuis son établissement au 3^{me} siècle jusqu'au 2 september 1792. Beauvais: Desjardins.
- McDonough, C. J. (1983). "Hugh Primas and the Bishop of Beauvais". Mediaeval Studies. 45 (1): 399–409.
