= Odo I of Beauvais =

West Frankish prelate

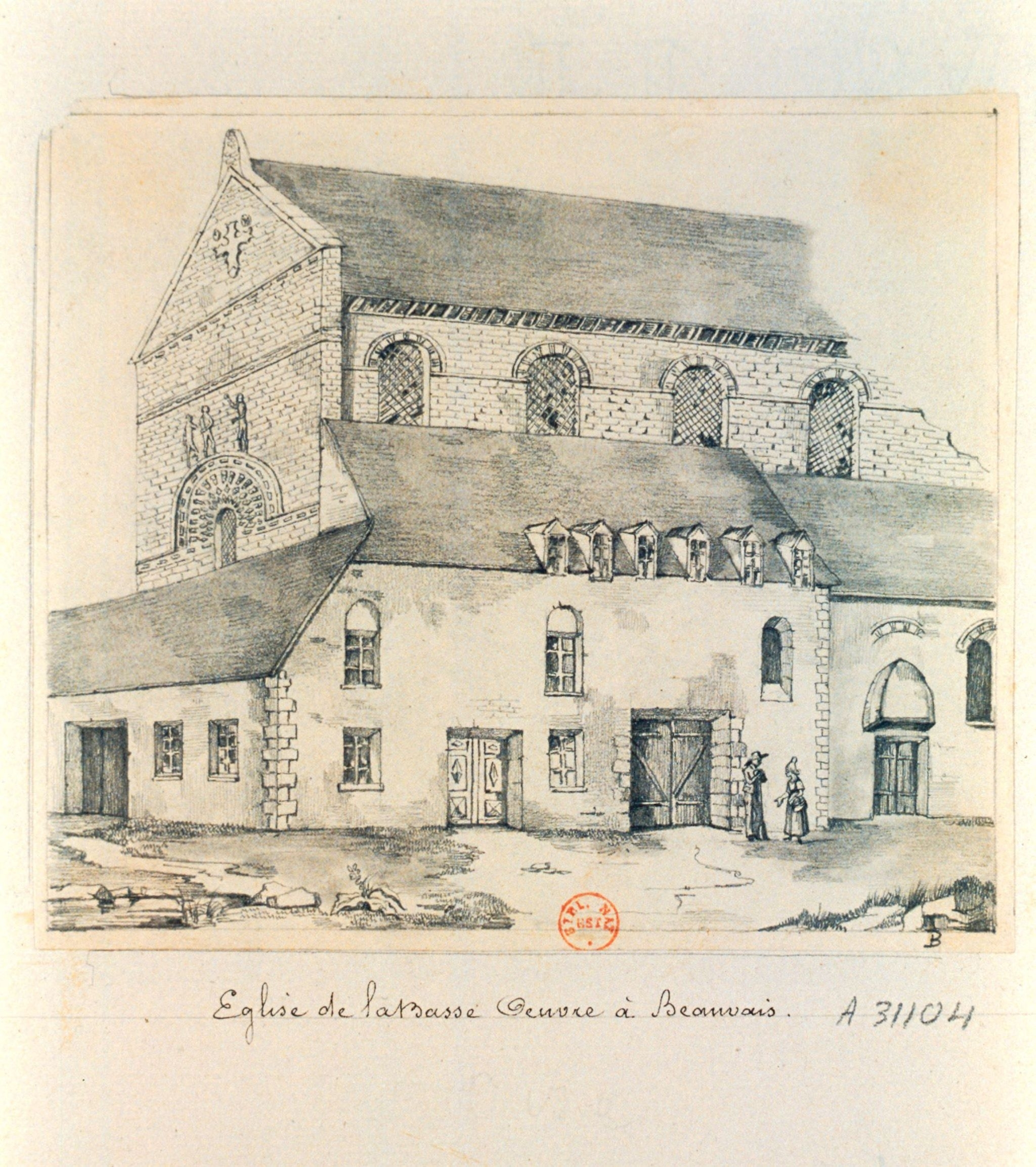
- The old Carolingian-era cathedral of Beauvais: Notre-Dame de la Basse Œuvre

Bishop, Abbot
- Residence: Corbie
- Died: 28 January 881
- Honored in: Catholic Church; Eastern Orthodox Church
- Feast: 28 January; 11 February

Odo I (or Eudes I) was a West Frankish prelate who served as abbot of Corbie in the 850s and as bishop of Beauvais from around 860 until his death in 881. He was a courtier and a diplomat, going on missions to East Francia and the Holy See.

He wrote a lost treatise on Easter in opposition to the Greek practice. He also wrote a passion of Saint Lucian, modelled on the hagiographical work of Hilduin, and was the first to portray Lucian as the founding bishop of Beauvais.

== Abbot ==
In 852, or at least before April 853, Paschasius Radbertus was removed and Odo installed as abbot of Corbie. In 855 Corbie received a privilege from Pope Nicholas I. During Odo's abbacy, the monk Ratramnus wrote the treatise De anima (On the Soul). The two developed an important working relationship, with Odo depending on Ratramnus to right tracts on pressing issues even after Odo became a bishop. In 859, Vikings under Weland attacked Corbie, which Odo ably defended, according to Lupus of Ferrières.

It was in this same wide-ranging raid that Ermenfrid, Odo's predecessor at Beauvais, was probably killed. The date of his death is established as 25 June in an obituary calendar preserved in Beauvais Cathedral, but the exact year is disputed. Most probably it was in 859, as indicated by the Annales Bertiniani, but the canons of the council of Tuzey, dated 22 October 860, bear Ermenfrid's signature. Philip Grierson and Charles Delettre both accepted the authenticity of the Tuzey canons and thus placed his death in June 861, pushing back the start of Odo's episcopate by two years.

The electors initially chose one Fromold to succeed Ermenfrid, but he was rejected as unqualified, and their second choice was Odo. A letter of Hincmar's may allude to Fromold's rejection by a synod, which would probably be that of Tuzey. If that is the case, then Odo's election would have occurred in October–November 860. The validity of the election was upheld in a decree (decretum) Odo had drawn up and witnessed by Archbishop Hincmar of Reims. He was consecrated before November 860, since he was senior to Bishop Raginelm of Noyon, who was consecrated on 7 November that year.

== Bishop ==
The first notice of Odo as bishop is of his attendance at the meeting of sovereigns at Savonnières in October–November 862. In the early 860s, when a monk of the abbey of Saint-Germer-de-Fly, which the bishop of Beauvais controlled, affirmed the heretical doctrine of Macarius the Irishman that there is only one soul that all men share, Odo contracted Ratramnus to write a tract, Liber de anima ad Odonem Bellovacenem, refuting Macarius. When in 867 a Greek synod deposed the pope, Nicholas I asked Hincmar of Reims to have a refutation of the Greeks composed. In 868, Hincmar asked Odo to do the same, and Odo commissioned Ratramnus to write it. The result was Contra Graecorum opposita, which defended papal supremacy and the filioque clause.

Odo became a courtier and favourite of King Charles the Bald. (He may have been the palatine archchaplain.) He served Charles as an envoy to the pope in Rome in 863. On 6 March 870, Odo was one of the envoys of Charles who met at Frankfurt with those of his brother, King Louis the German, and swore to work out a partition of the kingdom of Lotharingia between the two brothers.

On 16 July 876, Odo spoke at the Synod of Ponthion in favour of recognising the primacy of Archdiocese of Sens in Gaul, a position that put him at odds with his metropolitan, Hincmar of Reims. After the synod, on 28 August, Charles the Bald sent Odo as ambassador to his brother, Louis the German, along with the legates Leo of Sabina and Peter of Fossombrone and the bishops John of Toscanella and John of Arezzo. Louis died before the embassy could reach him, and they instead dealt with his sons, Carloman, Louis, and Charles.

On 14 June 877, Charles issued the famous Capitulary of Quierzy. In it, he specified the membership of the council that was to supervise the king's son, Louis, in the exercise of the royal functions while Charles was absent in Italy. Odo and two other bishops were charged with keeping in touch with Charles while he was away.

== Veneration ==
Odo is venerated in Catholic Church and Eastern Orthodox Church on 28 January (Diocese of Beauvais - 11 February)

== Sources ==
- Beck, Henry G. J. (1959). "The Selection of Bishops Suffragan to Hincmar of Rheims, 845–882". The Catholic Historical Review. 45 (3): 273–308. JSTOR 25016580.
- Delettre, Charles (1842). Histoire du Diocèse de Beauvais depuis son établissement au 3^{me} siècle jusqu'au 2 september 1792. Beauvais: Desjardins. p. 348.
- McKeon, Peter R. (1974). "The Carolingian Councils of Savonnières (859) and Tusey (860) and their Background: A Study in the Ecclesiastical and Political History of the Ninth Century". Revue Bénédictine. 84 (1–2): 75–110. doi:10.1484/J.RB.4.00784.
- McKitterick, Rosamond (1980). "Charles the Bald (823–877) and His Library: The Patronage of Learning". The English Historical Review. 95 (374): 28–47. doi:10.1093/ehr/xcv.ccclxxiv.28.
- Nelson, J. L. (1991). The Annals of St-Bertin. Manchester: Manchester University Press.
- Nelson, J. L. (1992). Charles the Bald. London: Longman.
- Reuter, Timothy (1992). The Annals of Fulda. Manchester: Manchester University Press. Archived from the original on 2010-02-26.
- Zola, Alan G (2008). Radbertus's Monastic Voice: Ideas about Monasticism at Ninth-century Corbie (Ph.D.). Loyola University Chicago.
