= Jacques Benoit-Gonnin =

French priest

Jacques Benoit-Gonnin Comm. l'Emm.
- Bishop of Beauvais
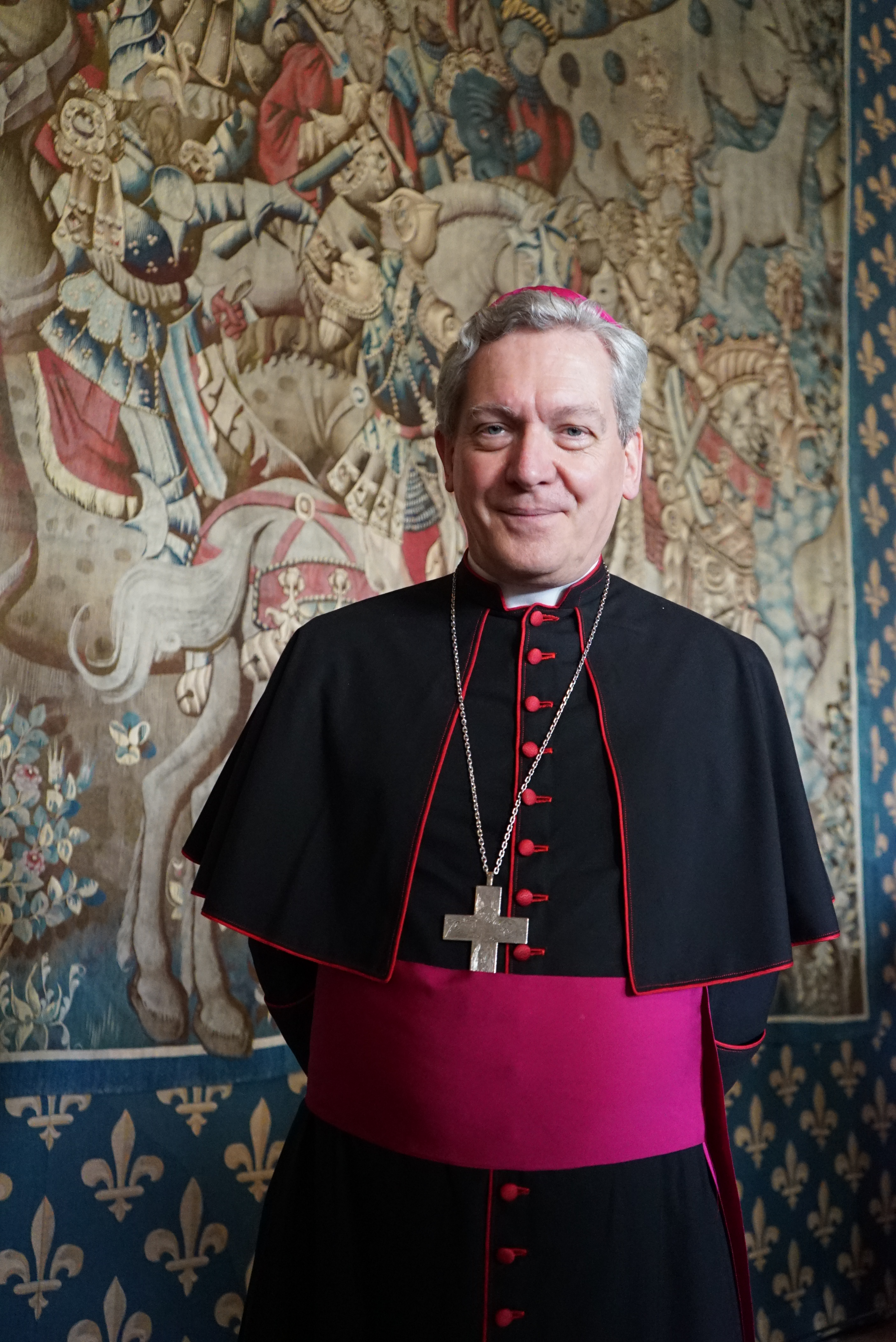
- Benoit-Gonnin in 2016
- Church: Catholic Church
- Diocese: Diocese of Beauvais
- Appointed: 18 March 2010
- Predecessor: Jean-Paul James

Orders
- Ordination: 29 June 1985 by Jean-Marie Lustiger
- Consecration: 2 May 2010 by André Vingt-Trois

Personal details
- Born: 24 June 1952 (age 74) Thoiry, Ain, France

Jacques Benoit-Gonnin (born 24 June 1952) is a French prelate of the Catholic Church who has been Bishop of Beauvais since 2010. He is a member of the Emmanuel Community.

== Biography ==
Jacques Benoit-Gonnin was born on 24 June 1952 in Thoiry in the diocese of Belley-Ars. After secondary school, he obtained a license in public law from the Regional Administration Institute of Lyon. From 1973 to 1980 he worked on the staff of the Ministry of Infrastructure. He completed his theological studies at the Institut Catholique de Paris and studied canon law at the Institut Catholique de Lyon. He was ordained a priest of the Archdiocese of Paris on 29 June 1985.

From 1985 to 1989 he was chaplain at various colleges and high schools, while completing his own university studies. In 1989-1991 he was vicar of the Parish of the Holy Trinity in Paris. From 1991 to 1995 he was Director of the Maison Saint Augustin, a pre-seminary in Paris). From 1995 to 2002 he was head of the priests and seminarians of the Emmanuel Community and a member of its Community Council. From 1995 to 2007 he was also a member of the Council of the Fraternità de Jésus, the central governing body of the Emmanuel Community. From 2002 to 2010 he was parish priest of the Holy Trinity parish in Paris.

On 18 March 2010, Pope Benedict XVI named him Bishop of Beauvais. He received his episcopal consecration on 2 May 2010.

Within the Bishop's Conference of France he is a member of the council for catholic education.
