= Diocese of Beauvais =

Catholic diocese in Oise, Hauts-de-France, France

Coordinates: 49.432°N 2.08118°E

Diocese of Beauvais, Noyon, and Senlis Dioecesis Bellovacensis, Noviomensis et Silvanectensis Diocèse de Beauvais, Noyon et Senlis

Catholic
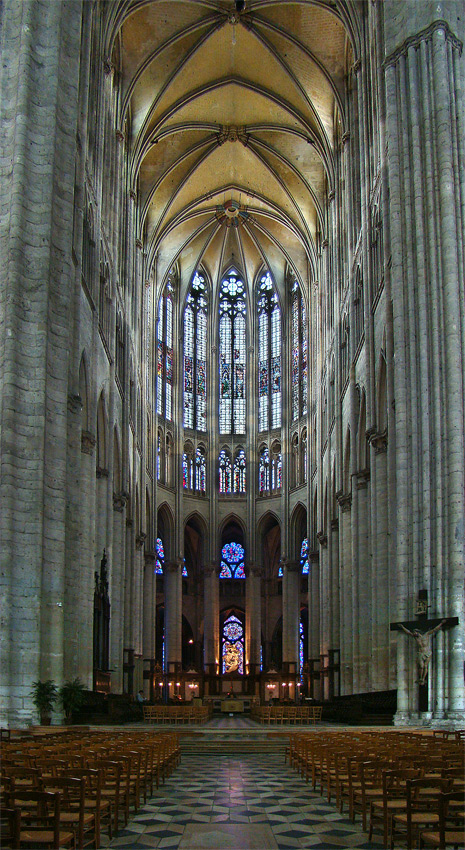
- St. Peter's Cathedral, Beauvais

Location
- Country: France
- Territory: Oise
- Ecclesiastical province: Reims
- Metropolitan: Archdiocese of Reims

Statistics
- Area: 5,855 km^{2} (2,261 sq mi)
- Population: Total; Catholics: (as of 2022); 831,000; 569,000 (est.) (68.5%)
- Parishes: 33

Information
- Denomination: Catholic Church
- Sui iuris church: Latin Church
- Rite: Roman Rite
- Established: 3rd century
- Cathedral: St. Peter's Cathedral, Beauvais
- Patron saint: St. Lucian of Beauvais
- Secular priests: 84 (Diocesan); 15 (Religious Orders); 32 Permanent Deacons

Current leadership
- Pope: Leo XIV
- Bishop: Jacques Benoit-Gonnin
- Metropolitan Archbishop: Éric de Moulins-Beaufort

Map

Website
- oise.catholique.fr

The Diocese of Beauvais, Noyon, and Senlis (Latin: Dioecesis Bellovacensis, Noviomensis et Silvanectensis; French: Diocèse de Beauvais, Noyon et Senlis) is a Latin Church ecclesiastical territory or diocese of the Catholic Church in France. The diocese encompasses the department of Oise in the region of Hauts-de-France. The diocese is a suffragan of the metropolitan Archdiocese of Reims. The current bishop is Jacques Benoit-Gonnin, appointed in 2010.

In 2022, in the Diocese of Beauvais, Noyon and Senlis there was one priest for every 5,747 Catholics.

== History ==
The Diocese of Beauvais was founded in the 3rd century, by St. Lucian (Lucianus, Lucien), according to a story first told in the 9th century. Gregory of Tours, who wrote in the second half of the 6th century, however, never speaks of the diocese of Beauvais or of any of its bishops. Neither does the name of Beauvais appear in the documents of any church council down to 695.

After 1015 each Bishop of Beauvais was simultaneously Count of Beauvais, and one of the Peers of France. Count Odo of Beauvais had given all of his lands in his county to Bishop Roger and the Church of Beauvais, with the consent of King Robert; he also made the bishop his heir to the county. The Bishop had a role in the coronation ceremony of the French king, and played a role in politics.

Bishop Roger II died during the First Crusade, Philip of Dreux was a participant in the Third Crusade and the Battle of Bouvines, and Pierre Cauchon was the leading judge in the trial of Jeanne d'Arc.

== Politics and scandal in Beauvais ==
Beginning in 1100, a five year long period of ecclesiastical, social and political discord descended upon Beauvais, involving eventually Bishop Ivo of Chartres, Archbishop Manasses of Reims, two papal legates, Joannes of Saint Anastasia and Benedict of Saint Pudenziana, King Philip I of France, and Pope Paschal II. On the death of Bishop Ansellus of Beauvais in November 1099, it became evident that there were two opposed parties in the business of the election of a successor. One was the majority of the Chapter and the secular clergy of the diocese, who were accommodated to the social system of society and preferred matters as they were; the other was led by the clergy of Saint-Quentin, who were seeking reform and greater rigor, and who looked to Ivo of Chartres, formerly a priest in Saint-Quentin, for advice and support. The Chapter chose as its candidate Étienne de Garlande, fourth son of Guillaume, Seneschal of France, a protégé of the excommunicated King Philip I and his mistress Bertrade, who were no doubt expecting Garlande's aid in solving their matrimonial problems. He was not in holy orders at all, and yet was Dean of Orleans and Archdeacon of Paris. The other candidate, supported by the monks of Saint-Quentin, was Walon (Gualon), abbot of Saint-Quentin. In the election, Étienne obtained exactly enough votes to form a majority.

It happened that the ecclesiastical province of Reims was holding a synod at Soissons, and the leaders of the winning party, the Dean and Archdeacons of Beauvais, went to announce the election and request that letters be sent to the King and the Pope on Etienne's behalf, and they petitioned Lambert of Arras, the Papal Visitor in the province to write to Pope Paschal as well. The letter to Lambert seriously misrepresented the facts in stating that the election was nearly unanimous. The losing party enlisted Ivo of Chartres, who made a detailed investigation into the deeds and character of Étienne Garlande. He found that Garlande was not in holy orders, that he was illiterate and addicted to gambling, that he had a bad moral reputation, that he had been excommunicated by the Legate Hugh de Die for public incontinence (which made him ineligible for ecclesiastical office), and that his election had been intrigued at by laymen who were excommunicated. He then wrote both to the papal legates, Joannes and Benedict, and to the Pope himself.

The Pope took the case, and Étienne had to make the journey to Rome to clear his reputation. He failed, but on his return to France, he extorted a letter of recommendation from Ivo of Chartres. The Pope, however, was not fooled, and quashed the election. A new election was ordered, and Lambert of Arras was ordered to preside at the election. The canonically convoked assembly elected Walon (Gualon) the Abbot of Saint-Quentin. The King, however, refused to recognize the election, and Prince Louis made a statement to the effect that Walon would never be bishop of Beauvais, and that the King should install Étienne immediately, which was done. The Pope, however, ratified the election of Gualon, and issued a mandate to Archbishop Manasses of Reims to consecrate him. The Archbishop was a friend of the Court, though, and had crowned the excommunicated King. He procrastinated in taking action. Gualon, therefore, set out for Rome, where he so impressed the Pope that Paschal appointed him Apostolic Legate to Poland. In the meantime the Church of Beauvais sank into disorder, with two competing jurisdictions, that of the uncanonical and unconsecrated Étienne, and that of the Vicars appointed by the Chapter in the absence of a consecrated bishop. The King raged against the Chapter and exiled several of the Canons, and Ivo of Chartres consoled it with the knowledge that it was canonically justified.

Finally, Ivo worked out a settlement with the King. Prince Louis held a meeting in Beauvais with the Chapter in January 1104, which brought peace to the city. Since the diocese of Paris happened to be vacant, the Pope authorized the transfer of bishop-elect Gualon to the diocese of Paris, and the seat of Beauvais was declared to be vacant. In December the King was reconciled to the Church, and his excommunication was lifted.

=== Councils in Beauvais ===
A synod was held in Beauvais in 845, in the presence of King Charles the Bald, during a sede vacante of the See of Beauvais. The synod ratified the election of Hincmar as Archbishop of Reims.

On 6 December 1114 a Council was held in Beauvais, presided over by the Papal Legate Cardinal Kuno von Erach (Conon, Kono). The Archbishops of Reims, Bourges and Sens and their suffragans participated. The Emperor Henry V was again anathematized, along with the Bishop of Münster and Count Thomas de Marla, who enjoyed raving the areas of Laon, Reims and Amiens. The case of Bishop Geoffroy of Amiens, who had been driven from his city by the burghers, was discussed, and his resignation was submitted. The discovery of Manichaean heretics in the diocese of Soissons was discussed, but action was deferred until the next synod.

Cardinal Kuno von Erach held another synod in Beauvais, on 18 October 1120. The purpose was to decide on the sainthood of Bishop Arnulf of Soissons (died 1087). The synod accepted his sanctity and authorized the moving of his remains from the convent of Aldenbourg in the diocese of Tournai to the cathedral of Soissons.

There is a note in the Chronicon Malleacense that a council took place at Beauvais in 1124. Nothing at all is known about it.

In 1160 an important council was convoked at Beauvais by King Louis VII of France. The papal Conclave of 1159 had produced a schism between Pope Alexander III and the puppet of the Emperor Frederick Barbarossa, Octavianus de' Monticelli, Cardinal of S. Cecilia, who called himself Victor IV. The council agreed with the King that Alexander III was the true pope, a judgment that was confirmed in a joint meeting held by Louis VII and Henry II of England at Toulouse in the autumn of 1160.

=== Hundred Years War ===
Beauvais, which was situated close to the frontier between English and French territories, was frequently subjected to attack and siege from the English and their allies, especially the Burgundians.

The celebrated Battle of Agincourt took place only a few miles north of Beauvais on 25 October 1415.

On 1 June 1427, Bishop Pierre Cauchon, who was a partisan of Philip the Good, Duke of Burgundy, and no supporter of Charles VII, was one of the consecrators of Jacques du Chastellier, the English candidate for the bishopric of Paris. He fled from Beauvais as Charles' armies appeared in the area, led by Jeanne d'Arc (Joan of Arc). Cauchon took refuge in Rouen, where he was induced by the English to sit as judge in the trial of Joan, who had been captured on 23 May 1430. After a contentious trial he pronounced her guilty, and had her turned over to the secular authorities to be burned as an heretic. He also assisted at the coronation of the English King Henry VI in Paris on 17 December 1431.

In 1452 the case was reopened on orders of Pope Nicholas V by Cardinal Guillaume d'Estouteville, cousin of a former bishop of Beauvais, but the proceedings did not lead to a definitive conclusion. In 1455 they were begun again on orders of the new pope, Calixtus III, and the bishop of Beauvais at the time, Bishop Guillaume de Hellande, as successor of Pierre Cauchon, was required to provide defense attorneys to argue the case for Cauchon's right conduct. The court issued its judgment on 7 June 1456: "We say, pronounce, decree and declare the said Processes and Sentences full of cozenage, iniquity, inconsequences, and manifest errors, in fact as well as in law. We say that they have been, and are, and shall be—as well as the aforesaid Abjuration, their execution, and all that followed—null, nonexistent, without value or effect."

In 1472 Beauvais was attacked and besieged by forces of the Duke of Burgundy. Their leader, Philippe de Crevecoeur, Sieur d'Esquerdes (des Cordes) launched the attack on 27 June, which broke through the fortifications and seized the faubourg de Saint-Quentin. Bishop Jean de Bar immediately mounted his horse and tried to leave the city, heading for Paris to obtain royal aid, but he was stopped by the defenders, who had orders to allow no one to leave the city. Matters were clarified, and the bishop was in Paris on July 1. He offered the leaders of the commune nearly 1,000 livres which the King had given for the construction of the cathedral. The Seigneur de Tressures had also ridden out and obtained several thousand troops from various sources, including Robert d'Estouteville, Provost of Paris. In the meantime, the church of Saint-Hippolyte, which had been taken by the besiegers, was destroyed by fire, and the episcopal palace, next to the ramparts, took fire in three places, perhaps by arson. Assaults continued through 6 July, at which there was a pause until the 9th. In the third assault, when the Burgundian standard was planted on the ramparts, a courageous Beauvasienne, Jeanne Hachette, grabbed it and threw it back down into the ditch, rallying the citizens to throw back the Burgundians, and even to mount a nighttime attack on the Burgundian camp which killed over 200, many of them officers. After losses of more than 3,000 men, the Duke of Burgundy abandoned the siege on 22 July. Three days later, the bishop celebrated a Mass. The Abbey of Saint-Quentin had been rendered uninhabitable.

=== Cathedral and Chapter ===
In 875, Bishop Odo, with the consent of King Charles the Bald, as an act of considerable generosity, increased the number of Canons in the Cathedral of Saint-Pierre to fifty. Around the year 1320, the cathedral was served by a Chapter composed of eight dignities (not 'dignitaries') and forty canons. The dignities were: the Dean (who was also Archdeacon of Bray), the Treasurer, the Archdeacon of Beauvais, the Archdeacon of Belvacinio, the Cantor, the Succentor, the Penitentiary, and the Chancellor. The Dean was elected by the Chapter, the others were episcopal appointments. By 1679 the dignities had been reduced to five.

Six of the churches in Beauvais were also capitular churches: Saint-Nicolas (6 prebends), Saint-Bartholomew (7 prebends), Saint-Michel (13 prebends), Saint-Laurent (7 prebends), Nôtre-Dame du Châtel (12 prebends), and Saint-Vaast (11 prebends). These offices were all benefices, in the gift of the bishop or of the Chapter, and provided a regular income for the incumbents. These offices were a way of rewarding faithful followers. There was also a Collegiate Church at Geberoy (headed by a Dean, with 5 prebends, later 12 prebends).

In 1516 King Francis I signed at treaty with Pope Leo X, which has come to be called the Concordat of Bologna, in which the King and his successors acquired the right to nominate each and every one of the bishops in France, except those of the dioceses of Metz, Toul and Verdun.

=== Revolution ===
During the French Revolution the diocese of Beauvais was suppressed by the Legislative Assembly, under the Civil Constitution of the Clergy (1790). Its territory was subsumed into the new diocese, called 'Oise', which was coterminous with the new civil department of the same name. Oise was made part of the Metropolitanate called the 'Métropole des Cotes de la Manche'. The new Civil Constitution mandated that bishops be elected by the citizens of each 'département', which immediately raised the most severe issues in Canon Law, since the electors did not need to be Catholics and the approval of the Pope was not only not required, but actually forbidden. Erection of new dioceses and transfer of bishops, moreover, was not canonically in the competence of civil authorities or of the Church in France. The result was schism between the 'Constitutional Church' and the Roman Catholic Church.

The legitimate bishop of Beauvais, François-Joseph de la Rochefoucauld, declined to take the required oath to the Civil Constitution, and betook himself to Paris, where he was accused and arrested. He was imprisoned in the monastery of the Carmelites, along with his brother, Pierre Louis, who was Bishop of Saintes. Both were massacred on 2 September 1792.

In 1791 the electors of 'Oise' assembled and elected as their Constitutional Bishop a priest, Jean-Baptiste Massieu, who had been a teacher, first at Vernon, and then at Nancy. He became cure of Cergy near Pontoise in 1782, and was elected to the Estates General for the bailliage of Senlis. He was in Paris at the time of his election, serving as an active member of the Ecclesiastical Committee which had drawn up the civil Constitution. He had just been elected secretary of the Legislative Assembly. He was consecrated at Notre-Dame de Paris on 6 March 1791 by Constitutional Bishop Jean-Baptiste Gobel, the seventh constitutional bishop to be consecrated. His behavior became more and more radical, during 1791 and 1792. He voted in favor of the execution of King Louis XVI. He resigned the priesthood and helped to organize the Terror. He married the daughter of the mayor of Givet, and presided at the Festivals of Reason. Complaints against him were so frequent, however, that he was delated to the Committee of Public Safety, and condemned on 9 August 1794. Somehow he escaped the guillotine and was pardoned in October 1794, and given a post as teacher in the school at Versailles. He had no successor in the Constitutional church, which he had helped to make universally loathed in the former diocese of Beauvais.

The territory of the former diocese of Beauvais was made part of the Diocese of Amiens when legitimate ecclesiastical government was restored in 1802. Church property, which had been confiscated for the public good by the Constitutional Assembly, was not restored. Bishops and priests therefore continued to be dependent upon salaries paid to them by the State, a practice which continued down until the Law of the Separation of the Churches and the State of 1905. The Diocese of Beauvais was re-established in 1822, and the Diocese of Beauvais, Noyon, and Senlis was created in 1851, comprising the territories of all three formerly separate dioceses. Beauvais Cathedral serves as the seat of the enlarged diocese.

== Bishops of Beauvais ==
=== Roman and Medieval Period ===
St. Lucianus (3rd century)
Thalasius
Victor
Chanarus
Numitius
Licerius
Themerus
Bertegesillus
Rodomarus
Ansoldus
Ribertus
Cogerimus

- Maurinus (c. 632–c. 638)

Himbertus

- Clement (c. 667–c. 683)
- Constantinus (c. 692–c. 706)

Radingus
Dodo
Marinus
Rocoaldus
Miroldus
Ercambertus
Austringus

- Deodatus

Andreas

- Hodingus
- Adalmanus
- Ragimbertus

=== 800–1100 ===
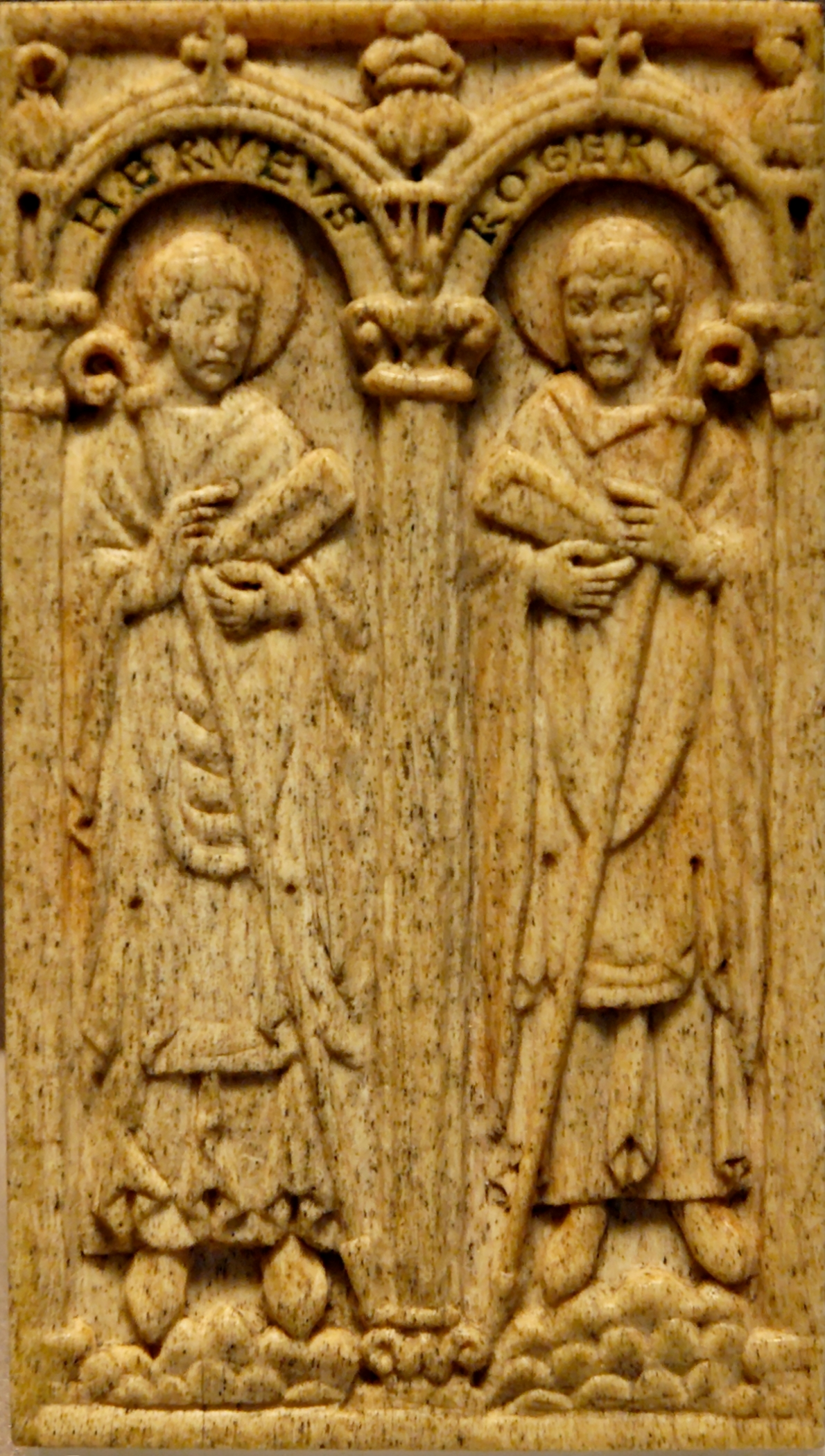
Herveus and Roger, two 10th cent. Bishops of Beauvais, panel from the binding of a Pontifical in the cathedral of Beauvais

- Hildemannus (c. 821–844)
- Erminfridus (846–859)
- Odo I (860–881)
- Hrotgarius (881–888)
- Honoratus (888–890)
- Herluin (909–921)
- Bovon
- Hildegar
- Walleran (933–972)
- Herveus (Hervé) (987–997)
- Hugues (997–1002)
- Roger of Blois (1002–1022)
- Warinus (1022–1030)
- Drogon (1035–1058)
- Guilbert (1059–1063)
- Guido (1063–1085), resigned
- Ursion of Melun (1085–1089)
- Fulk of Dammartin (1089–1095)
- Roger II (1095–1096)
- Ansel (1096–1099)

=== 1100–1300 ===
- Galon (1099–1104) Bishop-elect
- Godfrey of Pisseleu (1104–1114)
- Peter of Dammartin (1114–1133)
- Odo II (1133–1144)
- Odo III (1144–1148)
- Henry (1149–1162)
- Bartholomew of Montcornet (1162–1175)
- Philip of Dreux (1175–1217)
- Milo of Nanteuil (1217–1234)
- Godefrey de Clermont-Nestle (1234–1236)
- Robert de Cressonsacq (1237–1248)
- Guillaume de Grès (1249–1267)
- Renaud de Nanteuil (1267–1283)
- Theobald de Nanteuil (1283–1300)

=== 1300 to 1500 ===
- Simon de Clermont-Nesle (1301–1312/13)
- Jean de Marigny (1313–1347)
- Guillaume Bertrand (1347–1356)
- Philippe d'Alençon (1356–1360)
- Cardinal Jean de Dormans (1360–1368)
- Jean d'Anguerant (1368–1375)
- Miles de Dormans (1375–1387)
- Guillaume de Vienne (1387–1388)
- Thomas d'Estouteville (1388–1395)
- Louis d'Orléans (1395–1397)
- Pierre de Savoisy (1398–1412)
- Bernard of Chevenon (1413–1420)
- Pierre Cauchon (1420–1432)
- Jean Juvenal des Ursins (1433–1444)
- Guillaume de Hellande (1444–1462)
- Jean de Bar (1462–1488)

=== 1500 to 1800 ===
- Louis de Villiers de L'Isle-Adam (1497–1521)
- Antoine Lascaris de Tende (1523–1530)
- Charles de Villiers (1530–1535)
- Cardinal Odet de Coligny de Châtillon (Administrator, 1535–1563)
- Cardinal Charles de Bourbon (1569–1575)
- Nicolas Fumée (1575–1593)
- René Potier (1596–1616)
- Augustin Potier (1617–1650)
- Nicolas Choart de Buzenval (1651–1679)
- Cardinal Toussaint de Forbin-Janson (1679–1713)
- François Honoré Antoine de Beauvilliers de Saint-Aignan (1713–1728)
- Cardinal Étienne-René Potier de Gesvres (1728–1772)
- François-Joseph de la Rochefoucauld (1772–1792)

=== French Revolution ===
Jean-Baptiste Massieu (1802–1805) (Constitutional Bishop)

=== 1823–present ===
- Claude-Louis de Lesquen (1823–1825)
- François Hyacinthe Jean Feutrier (1825–1830)
- Jean-Louis-Simon Lemercier (1832–1838)
- Pierre-Marie Cottret (1838–1841)
- Joseph-Armand Gignoux (1842–1878)
- François Edouard Hasley (1878–1880)
- Désiré-Joseph Dennel (1880–1884)
- Joseph-Maxence Peronne (1884–1892)
- Frédéric Fuzet (1892–1900)
- Marie-Jean-Célestin Douais (1900–1915)
- Eugène-Stanislas Le Senne (1915–1937), died 14 March 1937
- Félix Roeder (1937–1955), retired 21 February 1955
- Pierre-Mararie Lacointe (1955–1965), died 23 April 1965
- Stéphane Émile Alfred Desmazières (1965–1978), retired 20 September 1978
- Jacques André Marie Jullien (1978–1984), later Coadjutor-Archbishop of Rennes, 21 May 1984
- Adolphe-Maria Gustave Hardy (1985–1995), retired 13 May 1995
- Guy Marie Alexandre Thomazeau (1995–2002), later Archbishop of Montpellier, August 28, 2002
- Jean-Paul James (2003–2009), later Bishop of Nantes
- Jacques Benoit-Gonnin (18 March 2010 – present)

== See also ==
- Catholic Church in France

== Bibliography ==
=== Reference works ===
- Gams, Pius Bonifatius (1873). Series episcoporum Ecclesiae catholicae: quotquot innotuerunt a beato Petro apostolo. Ratisbon: Typis et Sumptibus Georgii Josephi Manz. pp. 510–512. (Use with caution; obsolete)
- Eubel, Conradus, ed. (1913). Hierarchia catholica, Tomus 1 (second ed.). Münster: Libreria Regensbergiana. (in Latin) p. 132.
- Eubel, Conradus, ed. (1914). Hierarchia catholica, Tomus 2 (second ed.). Münster: Libreria Regensbergiana. (in Latin) p. 104.
- Gulik, Guilelmus (1923). Eubel, Conradus (ed.). Hierarchia catholica, Tomus 3 (second ed.). Münster: Libreria Regensbergiana. p. 131.
- Gauchat, Patritius (Patrice) (1935). Hierarchia catholica IV (1592-1667). Münster: Libraria Regensbergiana. p. 113.
- Ritzler, Remigius; Sefrin, Pirminus (1952). Hierarchia catholica medii et recentis aevi V (1667-1730). Patavii: Messagero di S. Antonio. p. 117.
- Ritzler, Remigius; Sefrin, Pirminus (1958). Hierarchia catholica medii et recentis aevi VI (1730-1799). Patavii: Messagero di S. Antonio. p. 119.
- Ritzler, Remigius; Sefrin, Pirminus (1968). Hierarchia Catholica medii et recentioris aevi sive summorum pontificum, S. R. E. cardinalium, ecclesiarum antistitum series... A pontificatu Pii PP. VII (1800) usque ad pontificatum Gregorii PP. XVI (1846) (in Latin). Vol. VII. Monasterii: Libr. Regensburgiana.
- Remigius Ritzler; Pirminus Sefrin (1978). Hierarchia catholica Medii et recentioris aevi... A Pontificatu PII PP. IX (1846) usque ad Pontificatum Leonis PP. XIII (1903) (in Latin). Vol. VIII. Il Messaggero di S. Antonio.
- Pięta, Zenon (2002). Hierarchia catholica medii et recentioris aevi... A pontificatu Pii PP. X (1903) usque ad pontificatum Benedictii PP. XV (1922) (in Latin). Vol. IX. Padua: Messagero di San Antonio. ISBN 978-88-250-1000-8.

=== Studies ===
- Delettre, André (1842). Histoire du Diocèse de Beauvais, depuis son établissement au 3me. siècle jusqu'au 2 septembre 1792 (in French). Vol. Tome I. Beauvais: Desjardins.
- Delettre, André (1843). Histoire du Diocèse de Beauvais, depuis son établissement au 3me siècle jusqu'au 2 septembre 1792 (in French). Vol. Tome II. Beauvais: Desjardins.
- Delettre, André (1843). Histoire du diocèse de Beauvais (in French). Vol. Tome III. Beauvais: Desjardin.
- Desjardins, Gustave (1865). Histoire de la cathédrale de Beauvais (in French). Beauvais: V. Pineau.
- Duchesne, Louis (1915). Fastes épiscopaux de l'ancienne Gaule Tome troisième. Paris: Fontemoing 1915, pp. 119–122.
- Jean, Armand (1891). Les évêques et les archevêques de France depuis 1682 jusqu'à 1801 (in French). Paris: A. Picard. pp. 454–458.
- Longnon, Auguste, ed. (1907). Recueil des historiens de la France: Pouillés (in French and Latin). Vol. Tome VI, deuxieme partie. Paris: Imprimerie Nationale. pp. 469–515.
- Pisani, Paul (1907). Répertoire biographique de l'épiscopat constitutionnel (1791-1802) (in French). Paris: A. Picard et fils.
- Pouillé général, contenant les bénéfices appartenans à la nomination au collaboration du Roy (in French). Paris: Chez Gervais Alliot. 1648. pp. c. 247–321 (75 pp).
- Sainte-Marthe, Denis de (1751). Gallia Christiana: In Provincias Ecclesiasticas Distributa... De provincia Remensi, ejusque metropoli ac suffraganeis, Suessionensi, Laudunensi, Bellovacensi, Catalaunensi ac Noviomensi ecclesiis. 9 (in Latin). Vol. Tomus nonus (IX). Paris: Typographia Regia. pp. 691–855.
- Société bibliographique (France) (1907). L'épiscopat français depuis le Concordat jusqu'à la Séparation (1802-1905). Paris: Librairie des Saints-Pères. pp. 346–350.
