= Beauvais Cathedral =

Catholic church in France

Beauvais Cathedral Cathédrale Saint-Pierre de Beauvais
- Picard: Cathédrale Saint-Pire ed Bieuvé
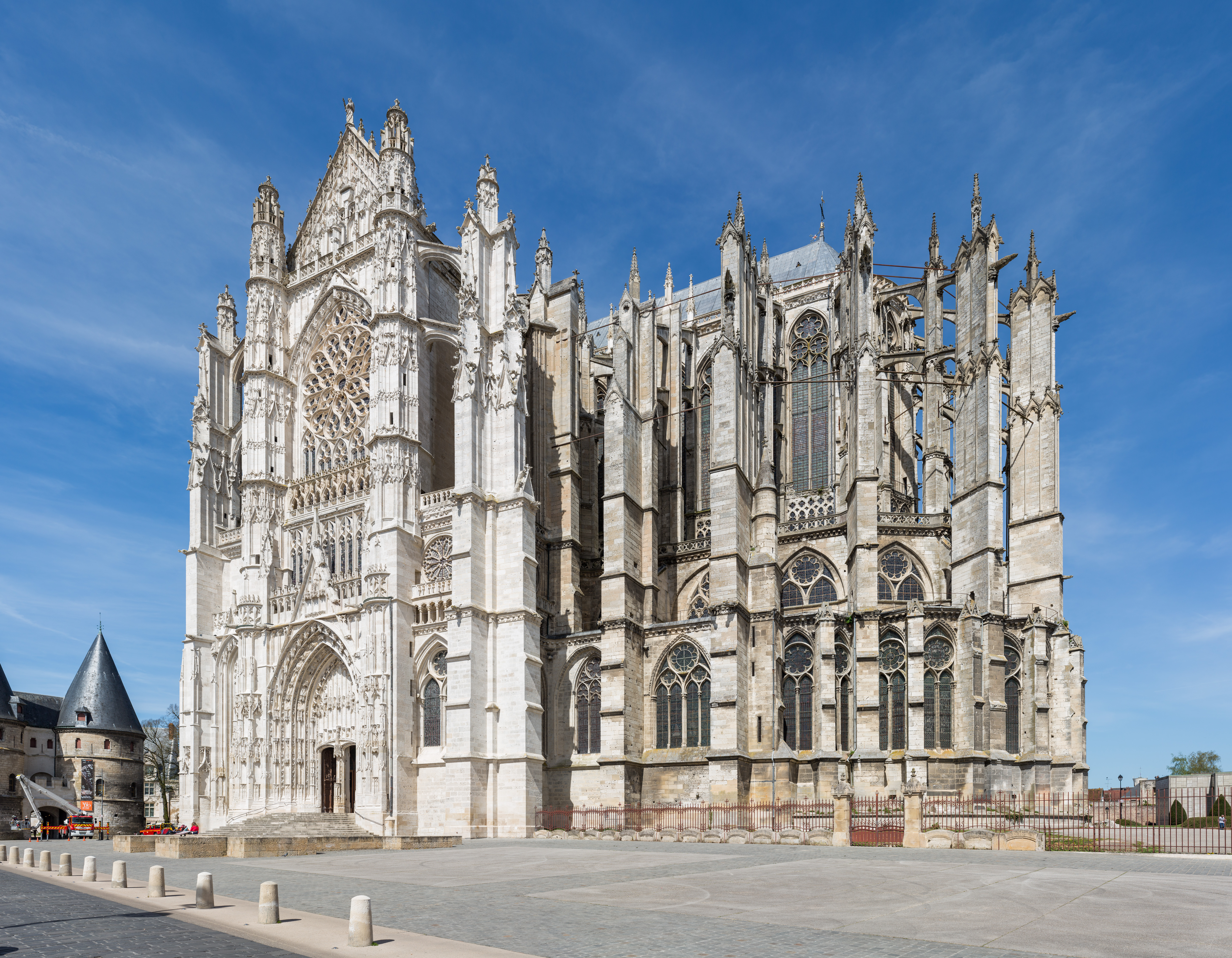
- Beauvais Cathedral from the south-east

Religion
- Affiliation: Catholic Church
- Province: Diocese of Beauvais, Noyon, and Senlis
- Rite: Roman
- Ecclesiastical or organisational status: Cathedral
- Leadership: Jacques Benoit-Gonnin
- Year consecrated: 1272; 754 years ago
- Status: Active

Location
- Location: Beauvais, France
- Interactive map of Beauvais Cathedral; Cathédrale Saint-Pierre de Beauvais
- Coordinates: 49.4326°N 2.0814°E

Architecture
- Architects: Enguerrand Le Riche; Martin Chambiges
- Type: Church
- Style: High Gothic
- Groundbreaking: 1225
- Completed: Incomplete. Work halted in 1600.

Specifications
- Length: 72.5 m (238 ft)
- Width: 67.2 m (220 ft)
- Width (nave): 16 m (52 ft)
- Height (max): 47.5 m (156 ft) (height nave)
- Monument historique
- Official name: Cathédrale Notre-Dame
- Designated: 1840
- Reference no.: PA00114502
- Denomination: Église

Website
- www.cathedrale-beauvais.fr/en/

Beauvais Cathedral, otherwise known as the Cathedral of Saint Peter of Beauvais (French: Cathédrale Saint-Pierre de Beauvais; Picard: Cathédrale Saint-Pire ed Bieuvé), is a Catholic cathedral in the northern town of Beauvais, Oise, France. It is the seat of the Bishop of Beauvais, Noyon and Senlis and has been listed as a national monument since 1840.

The cathedral consists of a 13th-century choir, with an apse and seven polygonal apsidal chapels reached by an ambulatory, joined to a 16th-century transept. It has the highest Gothic choir in the world: 48.5 metres (159 ft) under vault. From 1569 to 1573 the cathedral of Beauvais was, with its tower of 153 m (502 ft), the highest human construction of the world. Its designers had the ambition to make it the largest Gothic cathedral in France, ahead of Amiens and Notre-Dame de Paris. A victim of two collapses, one in the 13th century, the other in the 16th century, it remains unfinished today; only the choir and the transept were built, and the planned nave was never constructed. The remnant of the previous 10th-century Romanesque cathedral, known as the Basse Œuvre ("Lower Work"), still occupies the intended site of the nave.

== History ==
Construction on the cathedral began in 1225 under count-bishop Milo of Nanteuil, with funding from his family, immediately after the third in a series of fires in the 10th century Romanesque basilica, which had reconsecrated its altar only three years before the blaze. The cathedral choir was completed in 1272, in two campaigns, with an interval (1232–38) owing to a funding crisis provoked by a struggle with Louis IX. The two campaigns are distinguishable by a slight shift in the axis of the work and by changes in stylistic architectural design. Under Bishop Guillaume de Grez, an extra 4.9 m was added to the height to make it the highest-vaulted cathedral in Europe. The vaulting in the interior of the choir reached 47.5 m (156 ft) in height, far surpassing the concurrently constructed Amiens Cathedral, with its 42-metre (138 ft) nave, and making Beauvais Cathedral the tallest vault of all the Gothic cathedrals.

Work was interrupted in 1284 by the collapse of some of the vaulting of the recently completed choir. This disastrous collapse marked the beginning of an age of smaller structures generally, contemporaneously associated with demographic decline and the Hundred Years' War. However, large-scale Gothic design continued, and the choir was rebuilt at the same height, albeit with more columns in the chevet and choir, converting the vaulting from quadripartite vaulting to sexpartite vaulting. On January 14, the Feast of Asses was celebrated in Beauvais Cathedral, in commemoration of the Flight into Egypt. Construction continued through the 16th century, with the transept finished in 1548, and the 153 m (502 feet) tower in 1569, making the church the tallest structure in the world at that time. In 1573 on Ascension day, the collapse of the tower and crossing vaults halted work again. Repairs to transept vaults were rapidly completed and plans were drawn to construct a significantly taller tower than the structure before the collapse, but few additions were made due to a halt in funding. During the early 16th century, there was a plan to restart construction of the cathedral in a flamboyant Gothic style, but these were quickly abandoned. In 1600, construction on the nave began after a short funding allocation, but only the first arch was built before construction was halted for the final time. The truncated opening at the end of the choir was closed off with a provisional west wall, while the remaining portion of the original Romanesque church was left in place.

The cathedral suffered severe damage during the French Revolution, with the sans-culottes decapitating the statues of the doorways and looting the interior. However, the exterior structure was left mostly intact, and the building was then transformed into a Temple of Reason until the 19th century. During World War II, the cathedral was spared from serious damage, despite the city being almost completely destroyed by bombing. 75 of the original stained-glass windows had been safely moved out of the city; however, the great organ was destroyed. A new organ was rebuilt and installed on the west wall, and inaugurated in 1979.

== Structural condition ==
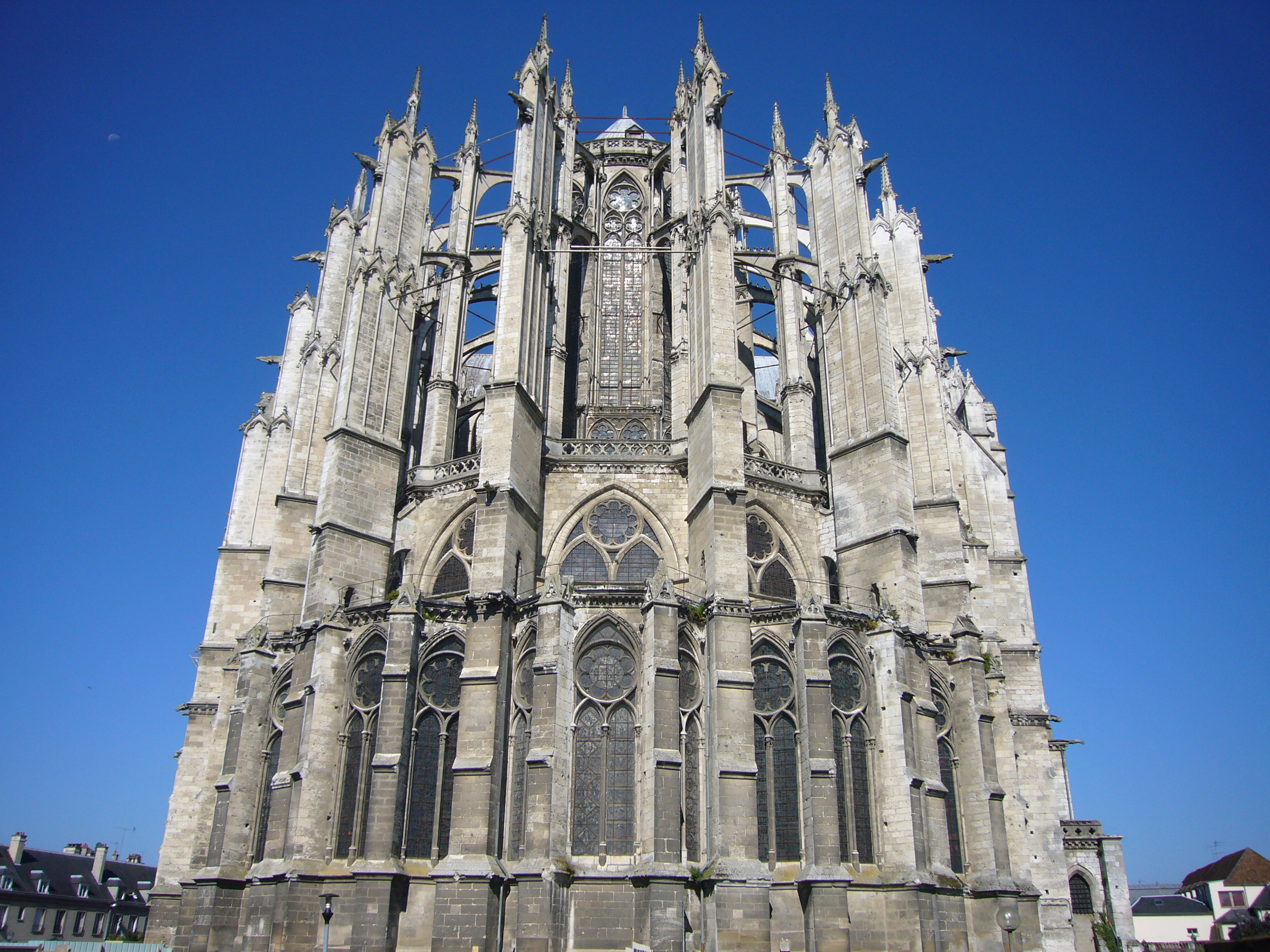
Beauvais Cathedral from the east

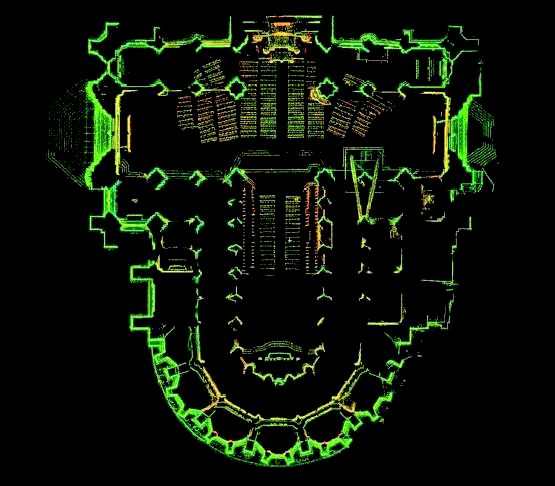
Plan image of Beauvais Cathedral, derived from laser scan data collected in 2007 by nonprofit CyArk to assist in building stabilization

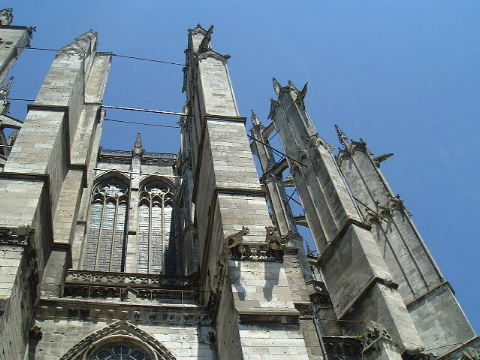
Lateral supports of flying buttresses

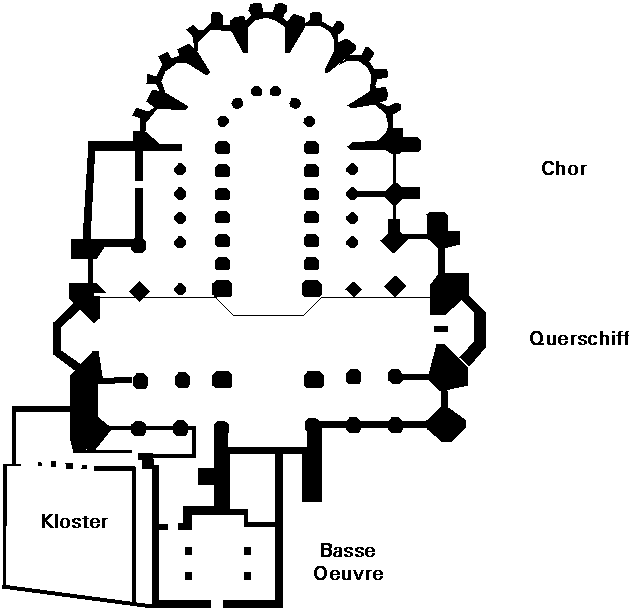
Current floorplan

In the race to build the tallest cathedral of the 13th century, the builders of Saint-Pierre de Beauvais pushed the engineering of the time to its limits. Even though the structure was planned to be taller, the buttresses were made thinner in order to permit a maximum amount of light into the cathedral. It is now believed that the vaulting collapse in 1284 was caused by resonant vibrations due to high winds.

During the 18th century, iron supports between the flying buttresses were added; it is not known when these external tie rods were installed. The technology would have been available at the time of the initial construction, but the extra support might not have been considered necessary until after the collapse in 1284, or even later. In the 1960s, the tie rods were removed; the thinking was that they were unnecessary. However, the oscillations created by the wind became amplified, and the choir partially disassociated itself from the transept. Subsequently, the tie rods were reinstalled, but with rods made of steel. Since steel is less ductile than iron, the structure became more rigid, possibly causing additional fissures. With the passage of time, other problems surfaced, some requiring more drastic remedies. The north transept now has four large wood-and-steel lateral trusses at different heights, installed during the 1990s to keep the transept from collapsing (see photograph below). In addition, the main floor of the transept is interrupted by a much larger brace that rises out of the floor at a 45-degree angle. This brace was installed as an emergency measure to give additional support to the pillars that, until now, have held up the tallest vault in the world.

These temporary measures will remain in place until more permanent solutions can be determined. Various studies are under way to determine with more assurance what can be done to preserve the structure. In 2001, Columbia University performed a study on a three-dimensional model constructed using laser scans of the building in an attempt to determine the weaknesses in the building and find remedies for them.

In September 2022 the French government began a restoration of the cathedral starting with the roof and removal of the interior supports. Part of the roof was analyzed and restored in a project starting in 2010. The analysis done on the roof included a "multidisciplinary study" of the lead tiles which made up the roof. The restoration remains uncompleted in 2026.

== Interior ==
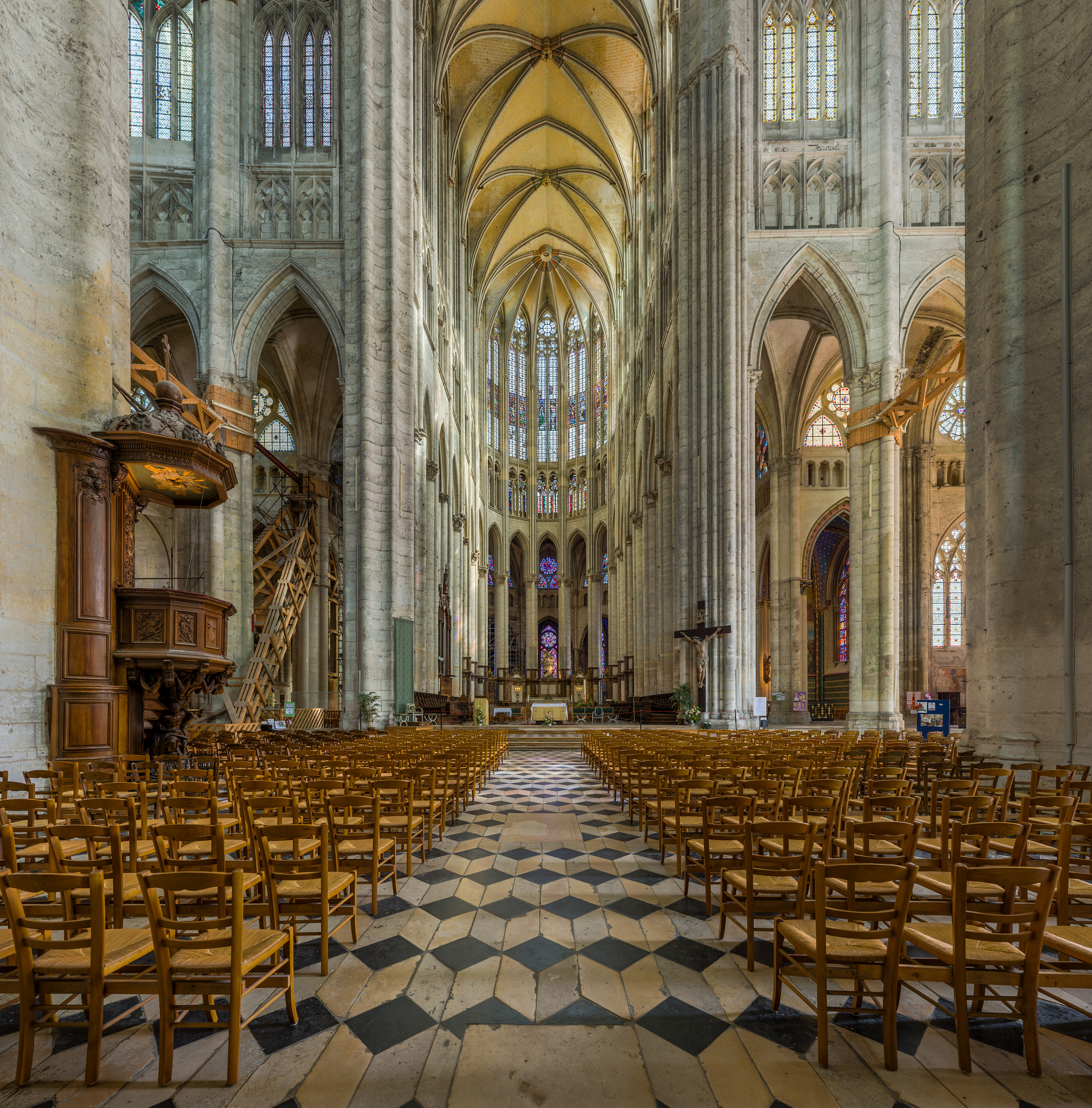
The interior of Beauvais Cathedral, looking towards the choir

The interior of the cathedral features a soaring ribbed vault similar in style to other Gothic French cathedrals constructed around the same time. The nave is slightly taller than that of St Peter's Basilica in Rome at 46.2 m (152 ft). A formerly often-quoted beginning date of 1247 was based on an error made by an early historian of Beauvais. Several of the chapels inside contain stained glass windows made from the 13th through to the 15th centuries. In a chapel close to the northern entrance, there is a medieval clock (14th – 15th century), possibly the oldest fully preserved and functioning mechanical clock in Europe. In its vicinity, the highly complicated Beauvais astronomical clock with moving figures was installed in 1866.

The choir has been well-received by critics, with Eugène Viollet-le-Duc calling the Beauvais choir "the Parthenon of French Gothic." Its façades, especially that on the south, exhibit details emblematic of the late Gothic style. The carved wooden doors of both the north and the south portals are examples, respectively, of Gothic and Renaissance workmanship. The church possesses an astronomical clock in neo-Gothic taste (1866) and tapestries of the 15th and 17th centuries, as well as stained glass windows of the 13th, 14th, and 16th centuries. Many of these were produced by Renaissance artist Engrand Le Prince, a native of Beauvais.

== See also ==
- List of highest church naves
- Beauvais Missal

Records
Preceded by St Mary's Church, Stralsund	World's tallest structure 1569-1573; 153 m	Succeeded by St Mary's Church, Stralsund
