= Odo III of Beauvais =

Former bishop of the diocese of Beauvais

Odo III (or Eudes III; died 1148×49) was the bishop of Beauvais from 1144 until his death. Before becoming bishop, he was the Benedictine abbot of the monastery of Saint-Symphorien.

Odo may have attended the consecration of the new Abbey of Saint-Denis in 1144. When he died, the people and canons of Beauvais elected the king's brother, Henry, as bishop. When Hugh Primas attacked the bishop of Beauvais in a poem, he was referring to either Odo III or Henry.

== Sources ==
- Brown, Elizabeth A. R. (1992). "'Franks, Burgundians, and Aquitanians' and the Royal Coronation Ceremony in France". Transactions of the American Philosophical Society. New Series. 82 (7): i–xii + 1–189. doi:10.2307/1006483. JSTOR 1006483.
- Delettre, Charles (1842). Histoire du Diocèse de Beauvais depuis son établissement au 3^{me} siècle jusqu'au 2 september 1792. Beauvais: Desjardins. p. 348.
- McDonough, C. James (1983). "Hugh Primas and the Bishop of Beauvais". Mediaeval Studies. 45 (1): 399–409. doi:10.1484/J.MS.2.306309.
- McDonough, C. James (1984). "The Oxford Poems of Hugh Primas and the Arundel Lyrics". Toronto: Pontifical Institute of Medieval Studies.
